= List of Lucha Underground episodes =

Lucha Underground premiered on El Rey Network on October 29, 2014. It focuses on professional wrestling matches, with commentary from the former WWE commentator Matt Striker and the former World Championship Wrestling wrestler Vampiro. Video packages highlighting wrestlers or storylines, air throughout each broadcast as well as several interactions between either the wrestlers themselves or with storyline promoter Dario Cueto, who is portrayed as a heel.

At the end of season 4, 127 episodes of Lucha Underground have aired.

== Series overview ==
Season	Episodes	Originally released	
Season	Episodes	First released	Last released
1	39	October 29, 2014	August 5, 2015
2	26	January 27, 2016	July 20, 2016
3	40	September 7, 2016	October 18, 2017
4	22	June 13, 2018	October 31, 2018

== Episodes ==
=== Season 1 (2014–15) ===
No. in series	No. in season	Title	Taped date	Original air date
1	1	"Welcome to the Temple"	September 6, 2014	October 29, 2014
2	2	"Los Demonios"	September 7, 2014	November 5, 2014
3	3	"Cross The Border"	September 13, 2014	November 12, 2014
4	4	"Thrill Of the Hunt"	September 14, 2014	November 19, 2014
5	5	"Boyle Heights Street Fight"	September 27, 2014	November 26, 2014
6	6	"The Key"	September 28, 2014	December 3, 2014
7	7	"Top Of the Ladder"	October 4, 2014	December 10, 2014
8	8	"A Unique Opportunity"	October 4, 2014	December 17, 2014
9	9	"Aztec Warfare"	October 5, 2014	January 7, 2015
10	10	"Law of the Jungle"	October 18, 2014	January 14, 2015
11	11	"Last Luchador Standing"	October 18, 2014	January 21, 2015
12	12	"They Call Him Cage"	October 5, 2014	January 28, 2015
13	13	"Johnny Mundo vs. The Machine"	January 17, 2015	February 4, 2015
14	14	"Open Mic Night"	January 17, 2015	February 11, 2015
15	15	"Eye for an Eye"	January 18, 2015	February 18, 2015
16	16	"Caged Animals"	January 18, 2015	February 25, 2015
17	17	"A War Started in Mexico..."	January 24, 2015	March 4, 2015
18	18	"No Escape"	January 24, 2015	March 11, 2015
19	19	"Grave Consequences"	January 26, 2015	March 18, 2015
20	20	"The Art of War"	January 25, 2015	March 25, 2015
21	21	"Uno! Dos! Tres!"	February 7, 2015	April 1, 2015
22	22	"Mask vs. Mask"	February 7, 2015	April 8, 2015
23	23	"Fire In The Cosmos"	February 8, 2015	April 15, 2015
24	24	"Trios Champions"	February 8, 2015	April 22, 2015
25	25	"The Way Of The Drago"	February 21, 2015	April 29, 2015
26	26	"The Best In the Business"	February 21, 2015	May 6, 2015
27	27	"Ancient Medallions"	February 22, 2015	May 13, 2015
28	28	"Shoots And Ladders"	February 22, 2015	May 20, 2015
29	29	"Fight To The Death"	March 21, 2015	May 27, 2015
30	30	"Submit To The Master"	March 21, 2015	June 3, 2015
31	31	"The Desolation Of Drago"	March 22, 2015	June 10, 2015
32	32	"All Night Long"	March 11, 2015	June 17, 2015
33	33	"Death Vs. The Drago"	March 22, 2015	June 24, 2015
34	34	"Gold And Guerreros"	April 12, 2015	July 1, 2015
35	35	"Fuel To The Fire"	April 12, 2015	July 8, 2015
36	36	"The Beginning Of The End"	April 11, 2015	July 15, 2015
37	37	"PenUltima Lucha"	April 18, 2015	July 22, 2015
38	38	"Ultima Lucha Part 1"	April 18, 2015	July 29, 2015
39	39	"Ultima Lucha Part 2"	April 19, 2015	August 5, 2015

=== Season 2 (2016) ===
No. in series	No. in season	Title	Taped date	Original air date
40	1	"A Much Darker Place"	November 14, 2015	January 27, 2016
41	2	"The Dark and the Mysterious"	November 14, 2015	February 3, 2016
42	3	"The Hunt is On..."	November 15, 2015	February 10, 2016
43	4	"Cero Miedo"	November 15, 2015	February 17, 2016
44	5	"The Machine"	November 21, 2015	February 24, 2016
45	6	"Gift of the Gods Ladder Match"	November 21, 2015	March 2, 2016
46	7	"Death Comes In Threes"	November 22, 2015	March 9, 2016
47	8	"Life After Death"	November 22, 2015	March 16, 2016
48	9	"Aztec Warfare II"	December 12, 2015	March 23, 2016
49	10	"El Jefe is Back"	December 12, 2015	March 30, 2016
50	11	"Bird of War"	December 13, 2015	April 6, 2016
51	12	"Three's a Crowd"	December 13, 2015	April 13, 2016
52	13	"Monster meets Monster"	December 13, 2015	April 20, 2016
53	14	"Cage in a Cage"	December 13, 2015	April 27, 2016
54	15	"No Mas"	December 13, 2015	May 4, 2016
55	16	"Graver Consequences"	December 13, 2015	May 11, 2016
56	17	"Crime & Punishment"	January 10, 2016	May 18, 2016
57	18	"Enter The Mundo"	January 17, 2016	May 25, 2016
58	19	"Judgement Day"	January 17, 2016	June 1, 2016
59	20	"The Contenders"	January 16, 2016	June 8, 2016
60	21	"Six To Survive"	January 16, 2016	June 15, 2016
61	22	"Fame And Fortune"	January 17, 2016	June 22, 2016
62	23	"The Phoenix, the Dragon, and the Spaceman"	January 17, 2016	June 29, 2016
63	24	"Ultima Lucha Dos Part 1"	January 30, 2016	July 6, 2016
64	25	"Ultima Lucha Dos Part 2"	January 31, 2016	July 13, 2016
65	26	"Ultima Lucha Dos Part 3"	January 31, 2016	July 20, 2016

=== Season 3 (2016–17) ===
No. in series	No. in season	Title	Taped date	Original air date
66	1	"Wheel of Misfortune"	March 19, 2016	September 7, 2016
67	2	"The Amulet"	March 19, 2016	September 14, 2016
68	3	"Ultimate Opportunities"	March 20, 2016	September 21, 2016
69	4	"Brothers In Broken Arms"	March 19, 2016	September 28, 2016
70	5	"The Prince And The Monster"	March 20, 2016	October 5, 2016
71	6	"The Open Road To Revenge"	March 20, 2016	October 12, 2016
72	7	"Payback Time"	March 26, 2016	October 19, 2016
73	8	"Gifts Of The Gods"	March 26, 2016	October 26, 2016
74	9	"Loser Leaves Lucha"	March 27, 2016	November 2, 2016
75	10	"Ready For War"	March 27, 2016	November 9, 2016
76	11	"Aztec Warfare III"	April 9, 2016	November 16, 2016
77	12	"Every Woman is Sexy, Every Woman is a Star"	April 10, 2016	November 23, 2016
78	13	"Breaker Of Bones"	April 10, 2016	November 30, 2016
79	14	"Bulls Of Boyle Heights"	April 9, 2016	December 7, 2016
80	15	"En La Sombra"	April 10, 2016	December 14, 2016
81	16	"The Battle of the Bulls"	April 23, 2016	December 21, 2016
82	17	"The Gauntlet"	April 24, 2016	December 28, 2016
83	18	"Evil Rising"	April 24, 2016	January 4, 2017
84	19	"Gods Among Men"	April 23, 2016	January 11, 2017
85	20	"All Night Long... Again"	April 24, 2016	May 31, 2017
86	21	"Sudden Death"	May 7, 2016	June 7, 2017
87	22	"The Cup Begins"	May 8, 2016	June 14, 2017
88	23	"Family First"	May 7, 2016	June 21, 2017
89	24	"Macho Madness"	May 7, 2016	June 28, 2017
90	25	"Left For Dead"	May 8, 2016	July 5, 2017
91	26	"A Fenix to a Flame"	May 14, 2016	July 12, 2017
92	27	"Fade to Black"	May 14, 2016	July 19, 2017
93	28	"Booyaka! Booyaka!"	May 15, 2016	July 26, 2017
94	29	"The Hunger Inside"	May 15, 2016	August 2, 2017
95	30	"Bloodlines"	May 15, 2016	August 9, 2017
96	31	"The Cup Runneth Over"	June 11, 2016	August 16, 2017
97	32	"The Cueto Cup"	June 11, 2016	August 23, 2017
98	33	"Havoc Running Wild"	June 11, 2016	August 30, 2017
99	34	"Career Opportunities"	June 11, 2016	September 6, 2017
100	35	"Cien"	June 12, 2016	September 13, 2017
101	36	"The Rise of the Ring Announcer"	June 12, 2016	September 20, 2017
102	37	"Ultima Lucha Tres Part 1"	June 25, 2016	September 27, 2017
103	38	"Ultima Lucha Tres Part 2"	June 25, 2016	October 4, 2017
104	39	"Ultima Lucha Tres Part 3"	June 26, 2016	October 11, 2017
104	40	"Ultima Lucha Tres Part 4"	June 26, 2016	October 18, 2017

=== Season 4 (2018) ===
No. in series	No. in season	Title	Original air date
105	1	"El Jefe"	June 13, 2018
106	2	"Darkness and the Monster"	June 20, 2018
107	3	"Rest in Pieces"	June 27, 2018
108	4	"Pain, Love and Sacrifice to the Gods"	July 4, 2018
109	5	"Sacrificio"	July 11, 2018
110	6	"Break the Machine"	July 18, 2018
111	7	"The Gift That Keeps on Giving"	July 25, 2018
112	8	"The Ranks of the Reptiles"	August 1, 2018
113	9	"A Match Made in Heaven"	August 8, 2018
114	10	"A Snake Scorned"	August 15, 2018
115	11	"Last Man or Machine Standing"	August 22, 2018
116	12	"Til Death Do Us Part"	August 29, 2018
117	13	"The Circle of Life"	September 5, 2018
118	14	"Pet Cemetery"	September 12, 2018
119	15	"The Hunted"	September 19, 2018
120	16	"Kill Mil"	September 26, 2018
121	17	"The Moth and the Butterfly"	October 3, 2018
122	18	"Spiders and Skeletons"	October 10, 2018
123	19	"Savagery"	October 17, 2018
124	20	"Seven to Survive"	October 24, 2018
125	21	"Ultima Lucha Cuatro: Part 1"	October 31, 2018
126	22	"Ultima Lucha Cuatro: Part 2"	October 31, 2018
