= Lucha Underground season 3 =

Lucha Underground
- Season 3
- Season three announcement on Twitter
- No. of episodes: 40

Release
- Original network: El Rey Network
- Original release: September 7, 2016 – October 18, 2017

Season chronology
- ← Previous; Season 2 Next → Season 4

The third season of Lucha Underground, a lucha libre or professional wrestling television show, began on September 7, 2016. The third season, just like the first and second was broadcast on the El Rey Network in the United States. The producers of Lucha Underground announced the season debut of the third season on July 29, 2016 just over a week after Ultima Lucha Dos, the last episode of season two had aired on the El Rey Network. All wrestling matches for the show were filmed at the Lucha Underground Temple" set in Boyle Heights, Los Angeles, California between March and June, 2016. This season includes 40 episodes, more than either of the previous seasons, therefore pushing Lucha Underground to a total of 105 episodes. Season three will follow the pattern of the first two seasons and generally air as one hour shows, first run on Wednesday nights at 8 PM Eastern Time.

The Lucha Underground show is a lucha libre serial drama television series that combines traditional professional wrestling matches with fictional storylines and effects. Season three will follow up on the events of season two, especially storylines left unresolved at the end of Ultima Lucha Dos. The announcement of season 3 featured the Cero Miedo ("No Fear") hand gesture of Lucha Underground performer Pentagón Dark.

== Episodes ==
No. overall	No. in season	Title	Taped date	Original air date
66	1	"Wheel of Misfortune"	March 19, 2016	September 7, 2016
The luchadores return to the temple where their fate will be determined by the spin of a wheel; Rey Mysterio competes.: No. / Results / Stipulations; 1 / Matanza Cueto (c) (with Dario Cueto) defeated Son of Havoc / Singles match for the Lucha Underground Championship; 2 / Sexy Star (c) defeated Taya / Singles match for the Gift of the Gods Championship; 3 / Rey Mysterio defeated Pentagón Dark / Singles match; (c) / – the champion(s) heading into the match
67	2	"The Amulet"	March 19, 2016	September 14, 2016
Killshot takes on Marty the Moth in the first Weapons of Mass Destruction Match; the power of an Aztec amulet is revealed.: No. / Results / Stipulations; 1 / Dr. Wagner Jr. (with Famous B and The Beautiful Brenda) defeated Mascarita Sagrada / Singles match; 2 / Mil Muertes (with Catrina) defeated Argenis / Singles match; 3 / Killshot defeated Marty "The Moth" Martinez / Weapons of Mass Destruction Match
68	3	"Ultimate Opportunities"	March 20, 2016	September 21, 2016
The Dial of Doom selects an opponent for Matanza Cueto; Dario makes an announcement; Trios titles championship match.: No. / Results / Stipulations; 1 / Matanza Cueto (c) (with Dario Cueto) defeated Willie Mack / Singles match for the Lucha Underground Championship; 2 / Cage defeated Texano / Singles match, 1st of a best of 5 series (C: 1, T: 0) For An Ultimate Opportunity; 3 / Aero Star, Drago and Fénix (c) defeated Worldwide Underground (Jack Evans, PJ Black and Taya) / Trios match for the Lucha Underground Trios Championship; (c) / – the champion(s) heading into the match
69	4	"Brothers In Broken Arms"	March 19, 2016	September 28, 2016
El Dragon Azteca Jr. battles against Chavo Guerrero with Rey Mysterio as the guest referee; The Worldwide Underground takes on the Trios Champions along with Sexy Star; Dario suspects Cortez Castro.: No. / Results / Stipulations; 1 / Prince Puma defeated El Sinestro De La Muerte / Singles match; 2 / Pentagón Dark defeated Cortez Castro / Singles match; 3 / Jack Evans, Johnny Mundo, PJ Black and Taya defeated Aero Star, Drago, Fénix and Sexy Star / Eight Person Tag Team match; 4 / El Dragon Azteca, Jr. defeated Chavo Guerrero Jr. / Singles match with Rey Mysterio as special guest referee
70	5	"The Prince And The Monster"	March 20, 2016	October 5, 2016
Matanza gets another opponent; Ivelisse finds a new love; Killshot receives some news; The Rabbit Tribe is introduced.: No. / Results / Stipulations; 1 / Ivelisse defeated Mariposa / Singles match; 2 / Cage defeated Texano / Singles match, 2nd of a best of 5 series (C: 2, T: 0) For An Ultimate Opportunity; 3 / Matanza Cueto (c) (with Dario Cueto) defeated Prince Puma / Singles match for the Lucha Underground Championship; (c) / – the champion(s) heading into the match
71	6	"The Open Road To Revenge"	March 20, 2016	October 12, 2016
Rey Mysterio vs Chavo Guerrero; Sexy Star vs Jack Evans; Son of Havoc and Mascarita Sagrada return with ravenous appetites for revenge.: No. / Results / Stipulations; 1 / Dr. Wagner Jr. and Famous B (with The Beautiful Brenda) defeated Son of Havoc and Mascarita Sagrada / Tag team match; 2 / Sexy Star (c) defeated Jack Evans / Singles match for the Gift of the Gods Championship; 3 / Pentagón Dark defeated Chavo Guerrero Jr. and Rey Mysterio / Three-way match; (c) / – the champion(s) heading into the match
72	7	"Payback Time"	March 26, 2016	October 19, 2016
Prince Puma versus Mil Muertes; Johnny Mundo seeks a match with Sexy Star; Dial of Doom picks another opponent for Matanza.: No. / Results / Stipulations; 1 / Matanza Cueto (c) (with Dario Cueto) defeated Killshot / Singles match for the Lucha Underground Championship; 2 / Drago defeated Aero Star and Fénix / Three-way match Winner gets the #20 spot in the Aztec Warfare; the other two are out of Aztec Warfare; 3 / Prince Puma defeated Mil Muertes (with Catrina) / Singles match; (c) / – the champion(s) heading into the match
73	8	"Gifts Of The Gods"	March 26, 2016	October 26, 2016
City Councilman Delgado arrives and gives Dario a gift; Sexy Star defends her title; Rey Mysterio asks Dario for a favor.: No. / Results / Stipulations; 1 / Marty "The Moth" Martinez (with Mariposa) defeated Ivelisse / Singles match; 2 / Texano defeated Cage / Singles match, 3rd of a best of 5 series (C: 2, T: 1) For An Ultimate Opportunity; 3 / Johnny Mundo defeated Sexy Star (c) / Singles match for the Gift of the Gods Championship; (c) / – the champion(s) heading into the match
74	9	"Loser Leaves Lucha"	March 27, 2016	November 2, 2016
Loser Leaves Town Match between Rey Mysterio and Chavo Guerrero; Dario gives the Dial of Doom a spin.: No. / Results / Stipulations; 1 / Matanza Cueto (c) (with Dario Cueto) defeated Cortez Castro / Singles match for the Lucha Underground Championship; 2 / Son of Havoc (with Mascarita Sagrada) defeated Dr. Wagner Jr. (with Famous B) / Singles match; 3 / Rey Mysterio defeated Chavo Guerrero Jr. / Loser Leaves Lucha Underground match; (c) / – the champion(s) heading into the match
75	10	"Ready For War"	March 27, 2016	November 9, 2016
Prince Puma and Mil Muertes in Graver Consequences; Mascarita Sagrada takes on Famous B in a Believer's Backlash Match.: No. / Results / Stipulations; 1 / Mascarita Sagrada defeated Famous B / Believer's Backlash match; 2 / Ivelisse, Marty "The Moth" Martinez, Willie Mack, Jeremiah Gray and Mariposa defeated Argenis, Cage, Dante Fox, Killshot and Texano / Ten Person Tag Team match; 3 / Mil Muertes (with Catrina) defeated Prince Puma / Grave Consequences match
76	11	"Aztec Warfare III"	April 9, 2016	November 16, 2016
Twenty luchadores compete in Aztec Warfare for the Lucha Underground Championship.: No. / Results / Stipulations; 1 / Sexy Star won by last eliminating Mil Muertes (Note: Other competitors were Matanza Cueto (c), Johnny Mundo, Son of Havoc, Jeremiah Crane, Pentagón Dark, P. J. Black, Mariposa, Rey Mysterio, Dr. Wagner Jr., Marty "The Moth" Martinez, Jack Evans, Ricky Mandel, Mascarita Sagrada, Famous B, Willie Mack, Joey Ryan, Kobra Moon, and Drago.) / Aztec Warfare for the Lucha Underground Championship
77	12	"Every Woman is Sexy, Every Woman is a Star"	April 10, 2016	November 23, 2016
A Lucha Underground Championship match; Black Lotus returns to the temple; The Rabbit Tribe arrives; Catrina confronts Jeremiah Crane.: No. / Results / Stipulations; 1 / Aero Star, Drago and Fénix (c) defeated The Rabbit Tribe (Paul London, Saltador and Mala Suerte) / Trios match for the Lucha Underground Trios Championship; 2 / Dante Fox defeated Killshot / Singles match; 3 / Johnny Mundo defeated Sexy Star (c) / Singles match for the Lucha Underground Championship; This was Johnny Mundo's Gift of the Gods Championship cash-in; (c) / – the champion(s) heading into the match
78	13	"Breaker Of Bones"	April 10, 2016	November 30, 2016
Vampiro demands satisfaction from his former student; Pentagon Dark battles the Black Lotus Triad; Dario and Matanza have different plans.: No. / Results / Stipulations; 1 / Pentagón Dark defeated Doku / Singles match; 2 / Pentagón Dark defeated Yurei / Singles match; 3 / Hitokiri defeated Pentagón Dark / Singles match
79	14	"Bulls Of Boyle Heights"	April 9, 2016	December 7, 2016
The Battle of the Bulls Tournament begins; Cortez Castro goes deeper undercover; Kobra Moon tells the history of her tribe.: No. / Results / Stipulations; 1 / Cage defeated Texano, Joey Ryan and Dr. Wagner Jr. (with Famous B and The Beautiful Brenda) / Fatal Four-Way Semifinal match in the Battle Of The Bulls Tournament; 2 / Sexy Star defeated PJ Black / Singles match; 3 / Willie Mack defeated Mil Muertes (with Catrina), El Dragon Azteca, Jr. and Marty "The Moth" Martinez / Fatal Four-Way Semifinal match in the Battle Of The Bulls Tournament
80	15	"En La Sombra"	April 10, 2016	December 14, 2016
The continuation of The Battle of the Bulls Tournament; El Dragon Azteca Jr. visits Rey Mysterio; Sexy Star is the target of mind games.: No. / Results / Stipulations; 1 / Jeremiah Crane defeated Dante Fox, Killshot and Mariposa / Fatal Four-Way Semifinal match in the Battle Of The Bulls Tournament; 2 / Drago defeated Kobra Moon / Singles match; 3 / PJ Black defeated Angélico, Jack Evans and Son of Havoc / Fatal Four-Way Semifinal match in the Battle Of The Bulls Tournament
81	16	"The Battle of the Bulls"	April 23, 2016	December 21, 2016
The tournament winner gets a title shot against the winner between Johnny Mundo and Sexy Star; Drago's fate is revealed.: No. / Results / Stipulations; 1 / Willie Mack defeated PJ Black, Jeremiah Crane and Cage / Fatal Four-Way Elimination Final match in the Battle Of The Bulls Tournament; 2 / Johnny Mundo (c) defeated Sexy Star / Steel Cage match for the Lucha Underground Championship; (c) / – the champion(s) heading into the match
82	17	"The Gauntlet"	April 24, 2016	December 28, 2016
Cage and Texano continue their series; Jeremiah Crane wrestles Mil Muertes; a luchador returns for some revenge.: No. / Results / Stipulations; 1 / Jeremiah Crane defeated Mil Muertes (with Catrina) / Singles match; 2 / Worldwide Underground (Jack Evans and PJ Black) defeated Angélico and Son of Havoc / Tag team match; 3 / Texano defeated Cage / Singles match, 4th of a best of 5 series (C: 2, T: 2) For An Ultimate Opportunity; 4 / Cage defeated Texano / Singles match, 5th of a best of 5 series (C: 3, T: 2) For An Ultimate Opportunity
83	18	"Evil Rising"	April 24, 2016	January 4, 2017
The Mack battles Johnny Mundo; Paul London and the Rabbit Tribe versus Kobra Moon and her reptiles.: No. / Results / Stipulations; 1 / Sexy Star defeated Mariposa / Singles match; 2 / The Reptile Tribe (Drago, Pindar and Vibora) (with Kobra Moon) defeated The Rabbit Tribe (Paul London, Saltador and Mala Suerte) / Trios match; 3 / Johnny Mundo defeated Willie Mack / Singles match to determine the stipulation for their future Lucha Underground Championship match
84	19	"Gods Among Men"	April 23, 2016	January 11, 2017
Johnny Mundo confronts The Mack about their championship match; El Dragon Azteca Jr. seeks a match with Matanza.: No. / Results / Stipulations; 1 / Texano defeated Joey Ryan / Singles match; 2 / Cage defeated Veneno / Singles match; 3 / Matanza Cueto (with Dario Cueto) defeated El Dragon Azteca, Jr. / Death match
85	20	"All Night Long... Again"	April 24, 2016	May 31, 2017
The Mack takes on Johnny Mundo in an All Night Long Match.: No. / Results / Stipulations; 1 / Johnny Mundo (c) vs. Willie Mack ended in a draw 3-3 / Iron Man match for the Lucha Underground Championship; (c) / – the champion(s) heading into the match
86	21	"Sudden Death"	May 7, 2016	June 7, 2017
The Lucha Underground Championship is defended; Dario makes an announcement; Prince Puma versus Mil Muertes in a Boyles Height Street Fight.: No. / Results / Stipulations; 1 / Johnny Mundo (c) defeated Willie Mack / Falls Count Anywhere match for the Lucha Underground Championship; 2 / The Reptile Tribe (Drago (c), Pindar and Vibora) (with Kobra Moon) defeated Aero Star and Fénix (c) / Trios match for the Lucha Underground Trios Championship; 3 / Prince Puma defeated Mil Muertes (with Catrina) / Boyle Heights Street Fight; (c) / – the champion(s) heading into the match
87	22	"The Cup Begins"	May 8, 2016	June 14, 2017
The Cueto Cup begins. Johnny Mundo and Rey Mysterio start their training; Cage visits Councilman Delgado.: No. / Results / Stipulations; 1 / Willie Mack defeated Mala Suerte / Singles match First Round of The Cueto Cup Tournament; 2 / Pentagón Dark defeated Argenis / Singles match First Round of The Cueto Cup Tournament; 3 / Texano defeated Famous B (with The Beautiful Brenda) / Singles match First Round of The Cueto Cup Tournament; 4 / Drago (with Kobra Moon) defeated Aero Star / Singles match First Round of The Cueto Cup Tournament
88	23	"Family First"	May 7, 2016	June 21, 2017
The Cueto Cup continues its first round; Marty the Moth continues his caddish ways; Rey Mysterio and Johnny Mundo ready themselves for their battle.: No. / Results / Stipulations; 1 / Cage defeated Vinny Massaro / Singles match First Round of The Cueto Cup Tournament; 2 / Marty "The Moth" Martinez defeated Saltador / Singles match First Round of The Cueto Cup Tournament; 3 / Pindar (with Kobra Moon) defeated Mascarita Sagrada / Singles match First Round of The Cueto Cup Tournament; 4 / Fénix defeated Mariposa / Singles match First Round of The Cueto Cup Tournament
89	24	"Macho Madness"	May 7, 2016	June 28, 2017
The Cueto Cup's first round continues; a new luchador arrives to the temple; Crane's jealously erupts.: No. / Results / Stipulations; 1 / Mil Muertes (with Catrina) defeated Veneno / Singles match First Round of The Cueto Cup Tournament; 2 / Paul London defeated Vibora (with Kobra Moon) via countout / Singles match First Round of The Cueto Cup Tournament; 3 / Taya defeated Joey Ryan / Singles match First Round of The Cueto Cup Tournament; 4 / Jeremiah Crane defeated Killshot / Singles match First Round of The Cueto Cup Tournament
90	25	"Left For Dead"	May 8, 2016	July 5, 2017
Dante Fox flashbacks to being a POW; the first round of The Cueto Cup winds down; Rey Mysterio and Johnny Mundo continue their training.: No. / Results / Stipulations; 1 / PJ Black defeated Sexy Star by disqualification / Singles match First Round of The Cueto Cup Tournament; 2 / Son of Havoc defeated Son of Madness / Singles match First Round of The Cueto Cup Tournament; 3 / Prince Puma defeated Ricky Mandel / Singles match First Round of The Cueto Cup Tournament; 4 / Dante Fox defeated El Dragon Azteca, Jr. / Singles match First Round of The Cueto Cup Tournament
91	26	"A Fenix to a Flame"	May 14, 2016	July 12, 2017
The Cueto Cup's second round begins; Marty the Moth battles Fenix; Brenda pays a visit to Texano.: No. / Results / Stipulations; 1 / Jeremiah Crane defeated Taya / Singles match Second Round of The Cueto Cup Tournament; 2 / Mil Muertes (with Catrina) defeated Paul London / Singles match Second Round of The Cueto Cup Tournament; 3 / Fénix defeated Marty "The Moth" Martinez (with Mariposa) / Singles match Second Round of The Cueto Cup Tournament
92	27	"Fade to Black"	May 14, 2016	July 19, 2017
The Cueto Cup continues; Vampiro gives counsel to Prince Puma on his match; Johnny Mundo introduces his agent to the Worldwide Underground.: No. / Results / Stipulations; 1 / Pindar (with Kobra Moon) defeated Cage by disqualification / Singles match Second Round of The Cueto Cup Tournament; 2 / Dante Fox defeated Son of Havoc / Singles match Second Round of The Cueto Cup Tournament; 3 / Prince Puma defeated PJ Black / Singles match Second Round of The Cueto Cup Tournament
93	28	"Booyaka! Booyaka!"	May 15, 2016	July 26, 2017
Rey Mysterio battles PJ Black; the Cueto Cup continues with its second round; Son of Madness confronts Son of Havoc.: No. / Results / Stipulations; 1 / Texano defeated Willie Mack / Singles match Second Round of The Cueto Cup Tournament; 2 / Pentagón Dark defeated Drago (with Kobra Moon) / Singles match Second Round of The Cueto Cup Tournament; 3 / Rey Mysterio defeated PJ Black / Singles match
94	29	"The Hunger Inside"	May 15, 2016	August 2, 2017
The Cueto Cup's quarterfinals begin; Dario admonishes Matanza; Marty the Moth continues with his unscrupulous behavior towards Melissa.: No. / Results / Stipulations; 1 / Fénix defeated Pindar (with Kobra Moon) / Singles match Third Round of The Cueto Cup Tournament; 2 / Prince Puma defeated Dante Fox / Singles match Third Round of The Cueto Cup Tournament; 3 / Johnny Mundo defeated El Dragon Azteca, Jr. / Singles match
95	30	"Bloodlines"	May 15, 2016	August 9, 2017
The Cueto Cup's quarterfinals continue; an FBI agent visits Dario Cueto.: No. / Results / Stipulations; 1 / The Rabbit Tribe (Paul London, Saltador and Mala Suerte) defeated Worldwide Underground (PJ Black, Taya and Ricky Mandel) / Trios match for three Golden Aztec Medallions; 2 / Mil Muertes (with Catrina) defeated Jeremiah Crane / Singles match Third Round of The Cueto Cup Tournament; 3 / Pentagón Dark defeated Texano / Singles match Third Round of The Cueto Cup Tournament
96	31	"The Cup Runneth Over"	June 11, 2016	August 16, 2017
Rey Mysterio and Johnny Mundo have a confrontation. The semifinalists compete; Catrina has her eyes on Cage's Gauntlet.: No. / Results / Stipulations; 1 / Prince Puma defeated Fénix / Singles match Semifinal match of The Cueto Cup Tournament; 2 / Pentagón Dark defeated Mil Muertes (with Catrina) / Singles match Semifinal match of The Cueto Cup Tournament
97	32	"The Cueto Cup"	June 11, 2016	August 23, 2017
The finalists battle for the Cueto Cup. Rey Mysterio vs Johnny Mundo for the Lucha Underground Championship.: No. / Results / Stipulations; 1 / Sexy Star defeated Veneno via countout / Mask vs. Mask match; 2 / Prince Puma defeated Pentagón Dark / Singles match Final match of The Cueto Cup Tournament; 3 / Johnny Mundo (c) defeated Rey Mysterio / Singles match for the Lucha Underground Championship; (c) / – the champion(s) heading into the match
98	33	"Havoc Running Wild"	June 11, 2016	August 30, 2017
Son of Madness and Son of Havoc's feud intensifies; Joey Ryan antagonizes Cortez Castro.: No. / Results / Stipulations; 1 / Son of Madness defeated Mascarita Sagrada / Singles match; 2 / Marty "The Moth" Martinez (with Mariposa) defeated Argenis / Singles match; 3 / Joey Ryan defeated Sexy Star / Singles match; 4 / Son of Havoc defeated Son of Madness / Biker's Brawl match for a Golden Aztec Medallion
99	34	"Career Opportunities"	June 11, 2016	September 6, 2017
Castro versus Ryan in a Five-O Street Fight; Johnny Mundo challenges Prince Puma at Ultima Lucha; Dario makes an announcement.: No. / Results / Stipulations; 1 / Drago (with Kobra Moon) defeated Willie Mack / Singles match for a Golden Aztec Medallion; 2 / Cortez Castro defeated Joey Ryan / 5-0 Street Fight for a Golden Aztec Medallion; 3 / Matanza Cueto (with Dario Cueto) defeated The Rabbit Tribe (Paul London, Saltador and Mala Suerte) / 3-on-1 Handicap match
100	35	"Cien"	June 12, 2016	September 13, 2017
Atomicos match; El Dragon Azteca Jr. versus Pentagon Dark; Rey Mysterio versus Matanza.: No. / Results / Stipulations; 1 / Worldwide Underground (Johnny Mundo, PJ Black, Taya and Marty "The Moth" Martinez) defeated Prince Puma, Fénix, Cage and Sexy Star / Eight Person Tag Team match; 2 / Pentagón Dark defeated El Dragon Azteca, Jr. / Singles match for a Golden Aztec Medallion; 3 / Matanza Cueto (with Dario Cueto) defeated Rey Mysterio / Singles match
101	36	"The Rise of the Ring Announcer"	June 12, 2016	September 20, 2017
Marty the Moth teams with Mariposa to take on Fenix and Melissa Santos; a seven-way Gift of the Gods title match.: No. / Results / Stipulations; 1 / Dante Fox defeated Texano / Singles match; 2 / Marty "The Moth" Martinez and Mariposa defeated Fénix and Melissa Santos / Tag team match; 3 / Pentagón Dark and Son of Havoc defeated Cortez Castro, Drago (with Kobra Moon), Paul London, Saltador and Mala Suerte / Seven-way for the vacant Gift of the Gods Championship
102	37	"Ultima Lucha Tres Part 1"	June 25, 2016	September 27, 2017
Killshot versus Dante Fox in The Hell of War match. Famous B competes.: No. / Results / Stipulations; 1 / Dr. Wagner Jr. and Famous B (with The Beautiful Brenda) defeated Texano / 2-on-1 Handicap match; 2 / Killshot defeated Dante Fox 2-1 / Hell Of War match
103	38	"Ultima Lucha Tres Part 2"	June 25, 2016	October 4, 2017
Fenix versus Marty the Moth in a Hair vs Mask match; Ivelisse battles Catrina.: No. / Results / Stipulations; 1 / Willie Mack defeated Argenis, Cortez Castro, Joey Ryan, Mala Suerte, Mascarita Sagrada, Paul London, Pimpinela Escarlata, PJ Black, Ricky Mandel, Saltador, Son of Madness and Vinny Massaro / Battle Royal for An Ultimate Opportunity; 2 / Ivelisse defeated Catrina / Singles match; 3 / Fénix defeated Marty "The Moth" Martinez (with Mariposa) / Mask vs. Hair match
104	39	"Ultima Lucha Tres Part 3"	June 26, 2016	October 11, 2017
Sexy Star battles Taya in a Last Luchadora standing match.: No. / Results / Stipulations; 1 / Sexy Star defeated Taya / Last Luchador Standing match; 2 / Dante Fox, Killshot and Willie Mack defeated The Reptile Tribe (Drago, Pindar and Vibora) (c) (with Kobra Moon) / Trios match for the Lucha Underground Trios Championship; 3 / Pentagón Dark defeated Son of Havoc / Ladder match for the vacant Gift of the Gods Championship; (c) / – the champion(s) heading into the match
104	40	"Ultima Lucha Tres Part 4"	June 26, 2016	October 18, 2017
El Dragon Azteca Jr. versus Matanza in a steel cage match; Jeremiah Crane battles Mil Muertes; Prince Puma tangles with Johnny Mundo.: No. / Results / Stipulations; 1 / Matanza Cueto (with Dario Cueto) defeated El Dragon Azteca, Jr. / Steel Cage match; 2 / Mil Muertes (with Catrina) defeated Cage and Jeremiah Crane / Gauntlet of the Gods Three-way Elimination match; 3 / Prince Puma defeated Johnny Mundo (c) / Title vs. Career match for the Lucha Underground Championship; 4 / Pentagón Dark defeated Prince Puma (c) / Loser Leaves Lucha Underground match for the Lucha Underground Championship; This was Pentagón Dark's Gift of the Gods Championship cash-in; (c) / – the champion(s) heading into the match
