= Lucha Underground season 2 =

Lucha Underground
- Season 2
- Official poster for season two
- No. of episodes: 26

Release
- Original network: El Rey Network
- Original release: January 27 – July 20, 2016

Season chronology
- ← Previous; Season 1 Next → Season 3

The second season of Lucha Underground, a Lucha libre or professional wrestling television show, began on January 27, 2016 and is broadcast on the El Rey Network in the United States. The show chronicles events that take place in the "Lucha Underground Temple". The producers behind Lucha Underground announced that the second season was a reality on September 21. Unlike the first season the second season of Lucha Underground was not picked up by UniMás and thus not broadcast in Mexico. The first episode was taped on November 15, 2015 in Boyle Heights, Los Angeles, California.

== Plot overview ==
At the beginning of season two, Lucha Underground Temple owner Dario Cueto (Luis Fernandez-Gil) has been absent from the Temple since the end of season 1 and Catrina (Karlee Perez) has taken charge of the temple, leaving it a "much darker place" as Matt Striker comments during the opening scene. Under her management Lucha Underground Champion Mil Muertes (Gilbert Cosme) and Lucha Underground Trios Champions the Disciples of Death control the operation. In their quest to control everything, Catrina hires King Cuerno to take the Gift of the Gods Championship from Fénix. Fénix defeated Mil Muertes to win the championship, only for Catrina to force him to defend the title during Aztec Warfare II. During the match Cueto dramatically returns, unleashing his brother Matanza on the temple, winning the Lucha Underground Championship in the process. Over the next few weeks, running alongside a tournament for the Lucha Underground Trios Championship, The Monster Matanza Cueto would go on to easily dispatch top technicos in the promotion like Pentagon Jr. and Fenix. Matanza's first real challenge came in the form of the former Lucha Underground Champion Mil Muertes. In their initial encounter, Mil Muertes delivered his finisher, the flatliner, to the Monster which sent both monsters through the roof of Dario Cueto's office. This put both monsters out of commission for several weeks and gave the crowd something that's rare in Lucha Underground, a no-contest finish.

== Episodes ==
No. overall	No. in season	Title	Taped date	Original air date
40	1	"A Much Darker Place"	November 14, 2015	January 27, 2016
The Luchadors return to compete, but with Dario Cueto on the run, darkness has taken over the temple.: No. / Results / Stipulations; 1 / King Cuerno defeated Fénix (c) / Singles match for the Gift of the Gods Championship; 2 / Ivelisse defeated Angélico and Son of Havoc / Three-way match for a shot at the Lucha Underground Championship; 3 / Mil Muertes (c) (with Catrina) defeated Ivelisse / Singles match for the Lucha Underground Championship; (c) / – the champion(s) heading into the match
41	2	"The Dark and the Mysterious"	November 14, 2015	February 3, 2016
Prince Puma teams with an unlikely partner; Johnny Mundo returns to the temple with his sights set on the championship.: No. / Results / Stipulations; 1 / Johnny Mundo defeated Killshot / Singles match; 2 / Willie Mack defeated P. J. Black / Singles match; 3 / Prince Puma and Pentagón Jr. defeated The Disciples of Death (Barrio Negro, El Sinestro de la Muerte and Trece) / Two-on-three handicap match
42	3	"The Hunt is On..."	November 15, 2015	February 10, 2016
Catrina enlists King Cuerno to help her destroy Fenix; Kobra Moon in her debut faces off against Bengala; Jack Evans versus Drago.: No. / Results / Stipulations; 1 / Kobra Moon defeated Bengala / Singles match; 2 / Jack Evans defeated Drago / Singles match; 3 / Fénix defeated King Cuerno / Last Luchador Standing match
43	4	"Cero Miedo"	November 15, 2015	February 17, 2016
Prince Puma takes on Pentagon Jr. for the first time; Rey Mysterio Jr. reveals the Cueto family's history.: No. / Results / Stipulations; 1 / Angélico, Ivelisse and Son of Havoc defeated Chavo Guerrero Jr., Mr. Cisco and Cortez Castro / Trios match; 2 / Cage defeated Joey Ryan / Singles match; 3 / Prince Puma defeated Pentagón Jr. / Singles match
44	5	"The Machine"	November 21, 2015	February 24, 2016
Johnny Mundo battles the Machine Cage; Texano returns for revenge against Chavo Guerrero and the crew.: No. / Results / Stipulations; 1 / Jack Evans defeated P. J. Black / Singles match; 2 / King Cuerno (c) defeated Killshot / Singles match for the Gift of the Gods Championship; 3 / Chavo Guerrero Jr., Cortez Castro and Mr. Cisco defeated Texano / No disqualification 3-on-1 elimination match; 4 / Johnny Mundo defeated Cage / Singles match; (c) / – the champion(s) heading into the match
45	6	"Gift of the Gods Ladder Match"	November 21, 2015	March 2, 2016
King Cuerno defends his Gift of the Gods Championship against Fenix in a ladder match; Kobra Moon takes on Sexy Star; Pentagon Jr. and Prince Puma face off for the number one contender spot for the Lucha Underground Championship.: No. / Results / Stipulations; 1 / Kobra Moon defeated Sexy Star / Singles match; 2 / Pentagón Jr. defeated Prince Puma by disqualification / Singles match; 3 / Fénix defeated King Cuerno (c) / Ladder match for the Gift of the Gods Championship; (c) / – the champion(s) heading into the match
46	7	"Death Comes In Threes"	November 22, 2015	March 9, 2016
Mil Muertes defends his Lucha Underground Championship in a triple threat match against Prince Puma and Pentagon Jr.: No. / Results / Stipulations; 1 / Marty Martinez defeated Willie Mack / Singles match; 2 / Cage defeated Taya / Boyle Heights Street Fight; 3 / Mil Muertes (c) defeated Prince Puma and Pentagón Jr. / Three-way match for the Lucha Underground Championship; (c) / – the champion(s) heading into the match
47	8	"Life After Death"	November 22, 2015	March 16, 2016
Fenix exchanges his Gift of the Gods Championship for a Lucha Underground Championship Match; the Trios Titles are defended. This episode was dedicated to Eiji "Hayabusa" Ezaki.: No. / Results / Stipulations; 1 / Angélico, Ivelisse and Son of Havoc defeated The Disciples of Death (Barrio Negro, El Sinestro de la Muerte and Trece) (c) / Trios match for the Lucha Underground Trios Championship; 2 / Texano defeated Chavo Guerrero Jr. / Bullrope match; 3 / Fénix defeated Mil Muertes (c) / Singles match for the Lucha Underground Championship; This was Fénix's Gift of the Gods Championship cash-in; (c) / – the champion(s) heading into the match
48	9	"Aztec Warfare II"	December 12, 2015	March 23, 2016
Twenty luchadors compete for the Lucha Underground Championship in the second Aztec Warfare. A few new luchadors debut in the ring.: No. / Results / Stipulations; 1 / Matanza Cueto won by last eliminating Rey Mysterio (Note: Other competitors were Fénix, King Cuerno, Argenis, Johnny Mundo, Joey Ryan, Prince Puma, Jack Evans, Taya, Cage, Mascarita Sagrada, Marty "The Moth" Martinez, Drago, Willie Mack, Chavo Guerrero Jr., P. J. Black, El Dragon Azteca, Jr., Texano, and Mil Muertes.) / Aztec Warfare for the Lucha Underground Championship
49	10	"El Jefe is Back"	December 12, 2015	March 30, 2016
Dario Cueto returns to the temple and makes the champion defend the Lucha Underground Championship. Mariposa takes on Sexy Star. This episode features the musical guest Chingon.: No. / Results / Stipulations; 1 / Cortez Castro and Mr. Cisco defeated Johnny Mundo and Taya / Tag team match; 2 / Angélico, Ivelisse, and Son of Havoc (c) defeated The Disciples of Death (Barrio Negro, El Sinestro de la Muerte and Trece) / Trios elimination match for the Lucha Underground Trios Championship; 3 / Mariposa defeated Sexy Star / Singles match; 4 / Matanza Cueto (c) defeated Pentagón Jr. / Singles match for the Lucha Underground Championship; (c) / – the champion(s) heading into the match
50	11	"Bird of War"	December 13, 2015	April 6, 2016
The Trios Tournament begins; Fenix faces the Monster Matanza Cueto for the championship; Famous B seeks his first client; Vampiro fights with his personal demons. This episode features the musical guest El Conjunto Nueva Ola.: No. / Results / Stipulations; 1 / Ivelisse defeated Kobra Moon / Singles match; 2 / Cortez Castro, Mr. Cisco, and Joey Ryan defeated Marty Martinez, Mariposa, and Willie Mack / First round in the Lucha Underground Trios Championship Tournament; 3 / Matanza Cueto (c) defeated Fénix / Singles match for the Lucha Underground Championship; (c) / – the champion(s) heading into the match
51	12	"Three's a Crowd"	December 13, 2015	April 13, 2016
Rey Mysterio, Prince Puma and El Dragon Azteca Jr. must compete in the Trios Tournament; Dario Cueto redistributes the Seven Ancient Aztec Medallions and lets a new luchador compete for one. This episode features the musical guest El Conjunto Nueva Ola.: No. / Results / Stipulations; 1 / Killshot defeated Argenis / Singles match; 2 / Texano defeated Daga / Singles match for a Golden Aztec Medallion; 3 / El Dragon Azteca Jr., Prince Puma, and Rey Mysterio defeated Johnny Mundo, Taya, and Cage / First round in the Lucha Underground Trios Championship Tournament
52	13	"Monster meets Monster"	December 13, 2015	April 20, 2016
Mil Muertes faces the Monster Matanza Cueto in a title match; an old rivalry is renewed over an Aztec Medallion. This episode features the musical guest El Conjunto Nueva Ola.: No. / Results / Stipulations; 1 / Aero Star defeated Drago / Singles match for a Golden Aztec Medallion; 2 / Fenix, P. J. Black, and Jack Evans defeated The Disciples of Death (Barrio Negro, El Sinestro de la Muerte, and Trece) / First round in the Lucha Underground Trios Championship Tournament; 3 / Matanza Cueto (c) (with Dario Cueto) vs. Mil Muertes (with Catrina) ended in a no contest / Singles match for the Lucha Underground Championship; (c) / – the champion(s) heading into the match
53	14	"Cage in a Cage"	December 13, 2015	April 27, 2016
Johnny Mundo takes on Cage in a Steel Cage Match for an Aztec Medallion; four teams compete in the Trios Tournament Finals; Pentagon Jr. struggles with his injuries. This episode features the musical guest Bang Data.: No. / Results / Stipulations; 1 / Cage defeated Johnny Mundo (with Taya Valkyrie) / Steel Cage match for a Golden Aztec Medallion; 2 / Rey Mysterio, El Dragon Azteca, Jr. and Prince Puma defeated Angélico, Ivelisse and Son of Havoc (c), Joey Ryan and The Crew (Mr. Cisco and Cortez Castro), and Fenix, P. J. Black, and Jack Evans / Fatal Four-Way Tag Team Elimination match for the Lucha Underground Trios Championship; Finals in the Lucha Underground Trios Championship Tournament; (c) / – the champion(s) heading into the match
54	15	"No Mas"	December 13, 2015	May 4, 2016
Sexy Star battles Mariposa for an Aztec Medallion in the first "No Mas" match; Catrina confronts Dario Cueto; Luchadors have matches for the other available Medallions. This episode features the musical guest Bang Data.: No. / Results / Stipulations; 1 / Willie Mack defeated Marty Martinez / Singles match for a Golden Aztec Medallion; 2 / El Sinestro De La Muerte (with Catrina) defeated King Cuerno / Singles match for a Golden Aztec Medallion; 3 / Cage defeated Mascarita Sagrada (with Famous B) / Singles match; 4 / Sexy Star defeated Mariposa / "No Mas" match for a Golden Aztec Medallion.
55	16	"Graver Consequences"	December 13, 2015	May 11, 2016
Mil Muertes battles the Monster Matanza Cueto in a casket match for the Lucha Underground Championship; Triple Threat match between Joey Ryan, Cortez Castro and Mr.Cisco; Rey Mysterio Jr, Dragon Azteca Jr and Prince Puma defend their titles. This episode features the musical guest El Conjunto Nueva Ola.: No. / Results / Stipulations; 1 / Joey Ryan defeated Cortez Castro and Mr. Cisco / Triple Threat match for a Golden Aztec Medallion; 2 / Rey Mysterio, El Dragon Azteca, Jr. and Prince Puma (c) defeated Son of Havoc, Ivelisse and Johnny Mundo / Trios match for the Lucha Underground Trios Championship; 3 / Matanza Cueto (c) (with Dario Cueto) defeated Mil Muertes (with Catrina) / Grave Consequences match for the Lucha Underground Championship; (c) / – the champion(s) heading into the match
56	17	"Crime & Punishment"	January 10, 2016	May 18, 2016
Seven Luchadors compete for the Gift of the Gods Championship; Cage seeks revenge. This episode features the musical guest El Conjunto Nueva Ola.: No. / Results / Stipulations; 1 / Daga defeated Argenis, Kobra Moon, and Mascarita Sagrada (with Famous B and The Beautiful Brenda) / Fatal Four-Way; 2 / Killshot defeated Marty Martinez / Singles match; 3 / Chavo Guerrero Jr. defeated Aero Star, El Sinestro de la Muerte, Joey Ryan, Sexy Star, Texano, and Willie Mack / Seven-way match for the vacant Lucha Underground Gift of the Gods Championship
57	18	"Enter The Mundo"	January 17, 2016	May 25, 2016
Rey Mysterio, Prince Puma and El Dragon Azteca Jr. defend their Trios Championship; Joey Ryan and Cortez Castro's cover gets blown; The Gift of the Gods Championship is defended. This episode features the musical guest Voodoo Glow Skulls.: No. / Results / Stipulations; 1 / Joey Ryan defeated Mascarita Sagrada (with Famous B and The Beautiful Brenda) / Singles match; 2 / Cage defeated Chavo Guerrero Jr. (c) / Singles match for the Gift of the Gods Championship; 3 / Worldwide Underground (Jack Evans, Johnny Mundo and P. J. Black) defeated Rey Mysterio, El Dragon Azteca, Jr. and Prince Puma (c) / Trios match for the Lucha Underground Trios Championship; (c) / – the champion(s) heading into the match
58	19	"Judgement Day"	January 17, 2016	June 1, 2016
The Monster Matanza Cueto defends his title against the Gift of the Gods Champion; The Trios Champions defend their titles. Dragon Azteca Jr. searches for his mentor's killer. This episode features the musical guest Voodoo Glow Skulls.: No. / Results / Stipulations; 1 / Son of Havoc defeated Daga / Singles match; 2 / Worldwide Underground (Jack Evans, Johnny Mundo and P. J. Black) (c) defeated Rey Mysterio, El Dragon Azteca, Jr. and Prince Puma / Trios match for the Lucha Underground Trios Championship; 3 / Matanza Cueto (c) (with Dario Cueto) defeated Cage / Singles match for the Lucha Underground Championship; This was Cage's Gift of the Gods Championship cash-in; (c) / – the champion(s) heading into the match
59	20	"The Contenders"	January 16, 2016	June 8, 2016
Drago & Aerostar face Jack Evans and P. J. Black in a Nunchuck Match; Pentagon Jr. returns to the Temple. This episode features the musical guest Voodoo Glow Skulls.: No. / Results / Stipulations; 1 / Killshot vs. Marty Martinez ended in a double countout / Singles match; 2 / Aero Star and Drago defeated Jack Evans and P. J. Black / Nunchuck Tag Team match; 3 / Fenix, Ivelisse, Johnny Mundo, King Cuerno, Pentagón Jr. and Taya defeated Rey Mysterio, Prince Puma, Sexy Star, Son of Havoc, Texano and Willie Mack / Twelve Person Tag Team match
60	21	"Six To Survive"	January 16, 2016	June 15, 2016
Six luchadors compete in the first ever Six to Survive Match for a Championship Match at Ultima Lucha Dos. This episode features the musical guest Voodoo Glow Skulls.: No. / Results / Stipulations; 1 / Pentagón Jr. defeated Fénix, Ivelisse, Johnny Mundo, King Cuerno and Taya / Six Way Elimination Match to determine the #1 contender for the Lucha Underground Championship
61	22	"Fame And Fortune"	January 17, 2016	June 22, 2016
The 7 Ancient Aztec Medallions are redistributed; Prince Puma addresses the Believers and reveals his plans for Ultima Lucha Dos; new luchador arrives at the Temple. This episode features the musical guest Voodoo Glow Skulls.: No. / Results / Stipulations; 1 / Daga defeated Mascarita Sagrada (with Famous B and The Beautiful Brenda) / Singles match for a Golden Aztec Medallion; 2 / El Sinestro de la Muerte, Killshot and Marty Martinez defeated Joey Ryan and The Crew (Mr. Cisco and Cortez Castro) / Trios match for a Golden Aztec Medallion; 3 / Sexy Star and Mariposa defeated Ivelisse and Taya / Tag team match for a Golden Aztec Medallion
62	23	"The Phoenix, the Dragon, and the Spaceman"	January 17, 2016	June 29, 2016
Dario Cueto announces a new opportunity that can be won at Ultima Lucha Dos; El Dragon Azteca faces Prince Puma. This episode features the musical guest El Conjunto Nueva Ola.: No. / Results / Stipulations; 1 / King Cuerno defeated Mil Muertes (with Catrina) / Singles match; 2 / Prince Puma defeated El Dragon Azteca Jr. (with Rey Mysterio) / Singles match; 3 / Johnny Mundo (with Taya) defeated Fénix / Singles match
63	24	"Ultima Lucha Dos Part 1"	January 30, 2016	July 6, 2016
Son of Havoc, Cage, Texano and the Mack compete for a unique opportunity where the winner is faced with a career defining decision. This episode features the musical guest El Conjunto Nueva Ola.: No. / Results / Stipulations; 1 / Willie Mack defeated Cage / Falls Count Anywhere Semifinal match in "The Tournament 4 a Unique Opportunity"; 2 / Son of Havoc defeated Texano / Bar Fight Semifinal in "The Tournament 4 a Unique Opportunity"; 3 / Son of Havoc defeated The Mack / Falls Count Anywhere Final match in "The Tournament 4 a Unique Opportunity"; 4 / Dr. Wagner Jr. (with Famous B and The Beautiful Brenda) defeated Son of Havoc / Singles match for Son of Havoc's Unique Opportunity
64	25	"Ultima Lucha Dos Part 2"	January 31, 2016	July 13, 2016
King Cuerno faces Mil Muertes in a Death Match; 7 Way Gift of the Gods Elimination Match. This episode features the musical guest El Conjunto Nueva Ola.: No. / Results / Stipulations; 1 / Sexy Star defeated Marty "The Moth" Martinez, Mariposa, Killshot, Night Claw, Daga and Sinestro de la Muerte / Seven-way Elimination match for the vacant Gift of the Gods Championship; 2 / Mil Muertes defeated King Cuerno / Death match
65	26	"Ultima Lucha Dos Part 3"	January 31, 2016	July 20, 2016
Rey Mysterio vs. Prince Puma; Pentagon vs. the Monster Matanza Cueto; Fenix, Drago and Aerostar vs. Worldwide Underground; Ivelisse vs. Taya; El Dragon Azteca Jr. vs. Black Lotus. This episode features the musical guest El Conjunto Nueva Ola.: No. / Results / Stipulations; 1 / Aero Star, Drago and Fénix defeated Worldwide Underground (Jack Evans, Johnny Mundo and P. J. Black) (c) / Trios match for the Lucha Underground Trios Championship; 2 / El Dragon Azteca Jr. vs. Black Lotus ended in a no contest / Singles match; 3 / Matanza Cueto (c) (with Dario Cueto) defeated Pentagón Dark / Singles match for the Lucha Underground Championship; 4 / Taya defeated Ivelisse / Singles match; 5 / Rey Mysterio defeated Prince Puma / Singles match; (c) / – the champion(s) heading into the match

== Reception ==
=== Critical reception ===
Lucha Underground's second season has received a mixed reception critically compared to the first, with more fans and professional wrestling media outlets aware of the product in its sophomore season. Loyal Lucha Underground fans have commended its storytelling and match quality, as well as its portrayal of women's wrestling, which some consider to be revolutionary while others remain uncomfortable with the concept of women wrestling men (particularly when the male opponent is a much larger and more powerful fighter, cf., Taya vs Cage) At Prowrestling.net, journalists Will Pruett and John Moore who were huge proponents of Lucha Underground's initial direction have criticized the second part of Season 2 as being both deflating and unorganized. Will Pruett in particular has stated that "Where Lucha Underground failed in 2016 was their storytelling. They didn’t support these great matches and moments wrestlers created in The Temple. They didn’t honor the experiences they wanted fans to have. The structure of the show felt fragmented, with far fewer episodes naturally leading into the next." PwTorch.com contributor Joel Dehnel has praised Lucha Underground for being "capable of doing some really great things" but "They are going to the well too many times in these matches with having no rules and high spots in the crowd that ultimately lead to nothing." He also stated that "they have gotten away far too many times with stories that make no sense and matches that are about entertaining the fans instead of telling a great story through visuals."

=== Ratings ===
Episode	First run viewership	Repeat viewership	Change from previous	Ref(s)
s2e1	130,000	105,000	n/a	
s2e2	125,000	76,000	-6%	
s2e3	136,000	81,000	+8%	
s2e4	152,000	52,000	+6%	
s2e5	99,000	62,000	-21%	
s2e6	124,000	63,000	+16%	
s2e7	95,000	41,000	-27%	
s2e8	100,000	57,000	+15%	
s2e9	163,000	69,000	+48%	
s2e10	159,000	63,000	-4%	
s2e11	156,000	78,000	+5%	
s2e12	139,000	66,000	-12%	
s2e13	149,000	49,000	-3%	
s2e14	107,000	52,000	-20%	
s2e15	138,000	42,000	+12%	
s2e16	96,000	42,000	-2%	
s2e17	127,000	37,000	-7%	
s2e18	114,000	68,000	+11%	
s2e19	111,000	40,000	-17%	
s2e20	85,000	61,000	-3%	
s2e21	89,000	39,000	-12%	
s2e22	104,000	62,000	+30%	
s2e23	116,000	103,000	+32%	
s2e24	104,000	39,000	-35%	
s2e25	108,000	56,000	+14.7%	
s2e26	180,000	43,000	+8%	
