= 6-Man Tag Team Championship =

A Six-Man Tag Team Championship (or 6-Man Tag Team Championship) is a title in tag team wrestling held by 3 people and defended in a six-man tag team match.

== Examples of active championships ==
Championship	Promotion	Date Est.
AEW World Trios Championship	AEW	July 27, 2022
ROH World Six-Man Tag Team Championship	ROH	August 30, 2016
Campeonato Mundial de Tercias AAA	AAA	June 18, 2011
Campeonato Mundial de Trios CMLL	CMLL	November 22, 1991
NEVER Openweight 6-Man Tag Team Championship	NJPW	December 21, 2015
Open the Triangle Gate Championship	Dragon Gate	November 7, 2004
KO-D 6-Man Tag Team Championship	DDT	December 23, 2012
Tenryu Project WAR World 6-Man Tag Team Championship	Tenryu Project	June 30, 1994

== Examples of inactive championships ==
Championship	Promotion	Date Est.	Date retired
WCW World Six-Man Tag Team Championship	WCW	February 17, 1991	December 4, 1991
NWA World Six-Man Tag Team Championship	NWA	May 6, 1955	December 1998
WCWA World Six-Man Tag Team Championship	WCWA	December 25, 1982	July 22, 1988
Lucha Underground Trios Championship	Lucha Underground	February 8, 2015	March 19, 2018
