= Ultima Lucha Tres =

- Lucha Underground episodes
- Episode nos.: Season 3 Episodes 37–40
- Presented by: Commentators: Matt Striker; Vampiro; Ring announcer: Melissa Santos
- Original air dates: Part 1: September 27, 2017; Part 2: October 4, 2017; Part 3: October 11, 2017; Part 4: October 18, 2017
- Running time: Part 1: 1 Hour; Part 2: 1 Hour; Part 3: 1 Hour; Part 4: 2 Hour

Guest appearance
- Lucha Underground personnel

Episode chronology
← Previous "Ultima Lucha Dos"	Next → "Ultima Lucha Cuatro"

"Ultima Lucha Tres" (Spanish for Last Fight Three) is the name of the final episodes of the third season of professional wrestling TV series Lucha Underground. The first part of Ultima Lucha Tres (episode 37) premiered on the El Rey Network on September 27, 2017. The second part (episode 38) was shown on October 4, The third part (episode 39) was shown on October 11 and the fourth part (and Season 3 finale) was broadcast October 18 on the El Rey Network and later shown in Mexico with Spanish commentary on the UniMás network. The episodes are the climax of several ongoing storylines that played out throughout the third season of Lucha Underground. As part of the season finale all three of the Lucha Underground championships were on the line. The episodes were taped on June 25 and 26, 2016.

== Event ==
For all four parts of Ultima Lucha Tres the commentators were Matt Striker and Vampiro, and the ring announcer was Melissa Santos.

== Results ==
=== Part 1 ===
No.	Results	Stipulations	Times
1	Dr. Wagner Jr. and Famous B (with The Beautiful Brenda) defeated Texano	2-on-1 Handicap match; since Texano lost, Famous B will be his new manager	4:23
2	Killshot defeated Dante Fox 2-1	Hell Of War match: Stage 1: First Blood match; Stage 2: No Disqualification match; Stage 3: Medical Evac match	25:23

=== Part 2 ===
No.	Results	Stipulations	Times
1	Willie Mack defeated Argenis, Joey Ryan, Mala Suerte, Mascarita Sagrada, Paul London, Pimpinela Escarlata, PJ Black, Ricky Mandel, Son of Madness and Vinny Massaro	Battle Royal for A Unique Opportunity	3:33
2	Ivelisse defeated Catrina	Singles match	6:13
3	Fénix defeated Marty "The Moth" Martinez (with Mariposa)	Mask vs. Hair match	12:18

=== Part 3 ===
No.	Results	Stipulations	Times
1	Sexy Star defeated Taya	Last Luchador Standing match	9:09
2	Dante Fox, Killshot and Willie Mack defeated The Reptile Tribe (Drago, Pindar and Vibora) (c) (with Kobra Moon)	Trios match for the Lucha Underground Trios Championship; this was The Mack's "Unique Opportunity"	7:58
3	Pentagón Dark defeated Son of Havoc	Ladder match for the vacant Gift of the Gods Championship	14:00
(c) / – the champion(s) heading into the match

=== Part 4 ===
No.	Results	Stipulations	Times
1	Matanza Cueto (with Dario Cueto) defeated El Dragon Azteca, Jr.	Steel Cage match	8:28
2	Mil Muertes (with Catrina) defeated Cage and Jeremiah Crane	Three-way Elimination match for Cage's Gauntlet of the Gods	14:09
3	Prince Puma defeated Johnny Mundo (c)	Title vs. Career match for the Lucha Underground Championship	18:26
4	Pentagón Dark defeated Prince Puma (c)	Loser Leaves Lucha Underground match for the Lucha Underground Championship; This was Pentagón Dark's Gift of the Gods Championship cash-in	8:32
(c) / – the champion(s) heading into the match
