= Lucha Underground season 4 =

Lucha Underground
- Season 4
- Official poster for season four
- No. of episodes: 22

Release
- Original network: El Rey Network
- Original release: June 13 – November 7, 2018

Season chronology
- ← Previous; Season 3

The fourth season of Lucha Underground, a lucha libre or professional wrestling television show, began on June 13, 2018. The third season, just like the past 3 seasons was broadcast on the El Rey Network in the United States. The producers of Lucha Underground announced on November 10, 2017, that Lucha Underground was renewed for a fourth season set to premiere in 2018. In February 2018, two of the show's producers, Eric van Wagenen and Chris DeJoseph, announced that the Temple would move from its former location in Boyle Heights to Union Central Cold Storage in Downtown Los Angeles. In early 2018, Lucha Underground entered into a working relationship with Impact Wrestling. On April 6, 2018, Lucha Underground held a collaborative event with Impact Wrestling that streamed lived on Twitch. During the co-promoted event with Impact Wrestling, a commercial aired announcing that the fourth season would begin airing on June 13, 2018.

The Lucha Underground show is a lucha libre serial drama television series that combines traditional professional wrestling matches with fictional storylines and effects. Season four followed follow up on the events of season three, especially storylines left unresolved at the end of Ultima Lucha Tres. Although it was not conceived as such, it ultimately turned out to be the final season, as Lucha Underground was later discontinued.

== Episodes ==
No. overall	No. in season	Title	Original release date
105	1	"El Jefe"	June 13, 2018
The Lucha Underground Temple moves to a new location and Pentagon Dark must defend his Lucha Underground Championship for the very first time; Dario Cueto's fate is revealed.: No. / Results / Stipulations; 1 / Pentagón Dark (c) won by last eliminating Marty "The Moth" Martinez (Note: Other competitors were Killshot, Willie Mack, Son of Havoc, Joey Ryan, Mr. Pectacular, Tommy Dreamer, Mariposa, Vinnie Massaro, Hernandez, Johnny Mundo, Ricky Mundo, Fénix, Jeremiah Crane, Mil Muertes, Daga, Chavo Guerrero Jr., King Cuerno, and El Dragon Azteca, Jr..) / Aztec Warfare for the Lucha Underground Championship; (c) / – the champion(s) heading into the match
106	2	"Darkness and the Monster"	June 20, 2018
Catrina hopes to restore her life and searches for the Gauntlet of the Gods; the Trios Champions defends their titles against three new fighters; one of the Seven Ancient Aztec Medallions comes back into play.: No. / Results / Stipulations; 1 / Son of Havoc, Killshot and Willie Mack (c) defeated Jake Strong, Big Bad Steve and Sammy Guevara (with Famous B and The Beautiful Brenda) / Trios match for the Lucha Underground Trios Championship; 2 / El Dragon Azteca, Jr. defeated Drago (with Kobra Moon) / Singles match for a Golden Aztec Medallion; 3 / Pentagón Dark (c) defeated Matanza Cueto / Singles match for the Lucha Underground Championship; (c) / – the champion(s) heading into the match
107	3	"Rest in Pieces"	June 27, 2018
Johnny Mundo and the Worldwide Underground plot revenge; Jack Evans issues a Put Up or Shut Up Challenge; a new challenger comes for the Lucha underground Champion; Fenix takes on Jermiah Crane and Mil Muertes in a 3 Way to the Grave Match.: No. / Results / Stipulations; 1 / XO Lishus defeated Jack Evans / Singles match; 2 / Mil Muertes (with Catrina) defeated Fénix and Jeremiah Crane / Grave Consequences match
108	4	"Pain, Love and Sacrifice to the Gods"	July 4, 2018
Catrina gives Melissa a gift; Johnny Mundo and Taya take on Kobra Moon & her king, Daga; Antonio gives King Cuerno the chance for revenge and the chance to win an Ancient Aztec Medallion; the Monster Matanza Cueto makes a Sacrifice to the Gods.: No. / Results / Stipulations; 1 / Jake Strong defeated Big Bad Steve / Singles match; 2 / Johnny Mundo and Taya defeated Daga and Kobra Moon / Tag team match; 3 / Matanza Cueto defeated Mr. Pec-Tacular / Sacrifice to the Gods match; 4 / King Cuerno defeated Chavo Guerrero Jr. / Singles match for a Golden Aztec Medallion
109	5	"Sacrificio"	July 11, 2018
Mil Muertes takes on Cage in one of three matches for Ancient Aztec Medallions; Matanza makes another Sacrifice to the Gods; Mascarita Sagrada takes Paul London and the Rabbit Tribe to finally meet the legendary White Rabbit.: No. / Results / Stipulations; 1 / Matanza Cueto defeated Cortez Castro / Sacrifice to the Gods match; 2 / Ivelisse defeated Joey Ryan / Singles match for a Golden Aztec Medallion; 3 / Willie Mack defeated Son of Havoc and Killshot / Three-way match for two Golden Aztec Medallions; 4 / Mil Muertes (with Catrina) defeated Cage / Singles match for a Golden Aztec Medallion
110	6	"Break the Machine"	July 18, 2018
Paul London battles newcomer Dezmond X for the Final Aztec Medallion; Johnny Mundo takes on the Giant Snake Man, Vibora; Jack Evans scouts XO Lishus; Cage does battle with Pentagon Dark.: No. / Results / Stipulations; 1 / Dezmond X defeated Paul London (with Saltador and Mala Suerte) / Singles match for a Golden Aztec Medallion; 2 / Willie Mack defeated Son of Havoc, Mil Muertes (with Catrina), El Dragon Azteca, Jr., Dezmond X, Ivelisse and King Cuerno / Battle Royal; The winner will decide who will be the odd person out of the Gift of the Gods Championship match; 3 / Vibora (with Kobra Moon) defeated Johnny Mundo (with Taya) / Singles match; 4 / Pentagón Dark (c) defeated Cage / Singles match for the Lucha Underground Championship; (c) / – the champion(s) heading into the match
111	7	"The Gift That Keeps on Giving"	July 25, 2018
A new Gift of the Gods Champion is crowned; Mariposa motivates her broken-armed brother Marty "The Moth" Martinez; Sammy Guevara looks for revenge against " The Savage" Jake Strong.: No. / Results / Stipulations; 1 / Jake Strong defeated Sammy Guevara / Singles match; 2 / Matanza Cueto defeated Vinny Massaro / Sacrifice to the Gods match; 3 / El Dragon Azteca, Jr., King Cuerno and Dezmond X defeated Ivelisse, Willie Mack and Son of Havoc / Trios qualifying match The winning team will compete in a three-way match for the vacant Gift of the Gods Championship; 4 / El Dragon Azteca, Jr. defeated King Cuerno and Dezmond X / Three-way match for the vacant Gift of the Gods Championship
112	8	"The Ranks of the Reptiles"	August 1, 2018
The rivalry between the Worldwide Underground and the Reptile Tribe escalates and the stakes are raised in the war between the two factions; The Mack suffers a haunting experience; Pentagon and Cage must find partners.: No. / Results / Stipulations; 1 / Daga (with Kobra Moon) defeated PJ Black / Singles match; 2 / Son of Havoc, Killshot and Willie Mack (c) defeated The Rabbit Tribe (Paul London, Saltador and Mala Suerte) / Trios match for the Lucha Underground Trios Championship; 3 / Cage and King Cuerno defeated Pentagón Dark / 2-on-1 Handicap match; (c) / – the champion(s) heading into the match
113	9	"A Match Made in Heaven"	August 8, 2018
Mariposa makes a proposal to Antonio Cueto; Paul London makes an offering to the Gods on behalf of the White Rabbit; The Worldwide Underground take on The Reptile Tribe in an Atomicos Match...If The Reptiles win, Johnny Mundo must join them.: No. / Results / Stipulations; 1 / Matanza Cueto defeated Mala Suerte (with Paul London and Saltador) / Sacrifice to the Gods match; 2 / Joey Ryan and Jack Evans defeated Ivelisse and XO Lishus / Tag team match; 3 / El Dragon Azteca, Jr. (c) defeated Mariposa / Singles match for the Gift of the Gods Championship; 4 / Worldwide Underground (Johnny Mundo, Taya, PJ Black and Aero Star) defeated The Reptile Tribe (Kobra Moon, Drago, Daga and Jeremiah Snake) / Atomicos (Eight-man tag team) match; (c) / – the champion(s) heading into the match
114	10	"A Snake Scorned"	August 15, 2018
Paul London attempts to satisfy the White Rabbit; tensions between the Trios Champions are at an all-time high as they are forced to defend their titles against a dangerous opponent; Cage and Pentagon Dark's conflict explodes.: No. / Results / Stipulations; 1 / Matanza Cueto defeated Saltador (with Paul London) / Sacrifice to the Gods match; 2 / El Dragon Azteca, Jr. (c) defeated Killshot / Singles match for the Gift of the Gods Championship; 3 / The Reptile Tribe (Kobra Moon, Daga and Jeremiah Snake) defeated Son of Havoc, Killshot and Willie Mack (c) / Trios match for the Lucha Underground Trios Championship; (c) / – the champion(s) heading into the match
115	11	"Last Man or Machine Standing"	August 22, 2018
Pentagon Dark battles Cage for the Lucha Underground Championship; The Mack vs. Mil Muertes in the first ever Haunted House Match; Johnny and Taya have a wedding shower; Rosa continues to have an influence on Ricky.: No. / Results / Stipulations; 1 / Mil Muertes (with Catrina) defeated Willie Mack / Haunted House match; 2 / Jake Strong defeated Aero Star / Singles match; 3 / Pentagón Dark (c) defeated Cage / Last Luchador Standing match for the Lucha Underground Championship; (c) / – the champion(s) heading into the match
116	12	"Til Death Do Us Part"	August 29, 2018
Johnny Mundo and Taya get married and their nuptials are filled with many surprises; XO Lishus takes on Jack Evans in a "No Mas" Match; Drago battles "The Savage" Jake Strong.: No. / Results / Stipulations; 1 / Jake Strong defeated Drago / Singles match; 2 / XO Lishus defeated Jack Evans / "I Quit" match
117	13	"The Circle of Life"	September 5, 2018
Melissa Santos and Catrina engage in an epic confrontation; the Monster Matanza Cueto makes another Sacrifice to the Gods; a Luchador seeking revenge comes after Pentagon Dark; Son of Havoc observes Killshot's match.: No. / Results / Stipulations; 1 / Matanza Cueto defeated Joey Wrestling / Sacrifice to the Gods match; 2 / Killshot defeated Big Bad Steve (with The Beautiful Brenda) / Singles match; 3 / Pentagón Dark (c) defeated Hernandez / Singles match for the Lucha Underground Championship; (c) / – the champion(s) heading into the match
118	14	"Pet Cemetery"	September 12, 2018
Fenix returns to the Temple to team with Drago and Aerostar against the Reptile Tribe; King Cuerno wants a Lucha Underground Championship Match, but he's not the only one; the Gift of the Gods Championship is defended.: No. / Results / Stipulations; 1 / El Dragon Azteca, Jr. (c) defeated Ivelisse / Singles match for the Gift of the Gods Championship; 2 / King Cuerno vs. Mil Muertes ended in a double disqualification / Singles match to determine the #1 contender for the Lucha Underground Championship; 3 / The Reptile Tribe (Kobra Moon, Daga and Jeremiah Snake) (c) defeated Fénix, Drago and Aero Star / Trios match for the Lucha Underground Trios Championship; (c) / – the champion(s) heading into the match
119	15	"The Hunted"	September 19, 2018
The Lucha Underground Championship and Gift of the Gods Championship are both defended; Melissa Santos and Aerostar notice a change in Fenix; Paul London pays another visit to the White Rabbit.: No. / Results / Stipulations; 1 / Fénix defeated Aero Star / Singles match; 2 / Marty "The Moth" Martinez defeated El Dragon Azteca, Jr. (c) / Singles match for the Gift of the Gods Championship; 3 / Pentagón Dark (c) defeated King Cuerno and Mil Muertes / Three-way match for the Lucha Underground Championship; 4 / Marty "The Moth" Martinez defeated Pentagón Dark (c) / Singles match for the Lucha Underground Championship; This was Marty "The Moth" Martinez's Gift of the Gods Championship cash-in; (c) / – the champion(s) heading into the match
120	16	"Kill Mil"	September 26, 2018
Ivelisse and XO Lishus find a new partner to help them face the Reptile Tribe; Jake Strong takes on Drago and Aero Star in a Nunchuck Match; a new number one contender for the Lucha Underground Championship is determined.: No. / Results / Stipulations; 1 / Matanza Cueto defeated Jack Evans / Sacrifice to the Gods match; 2 / The Reptile Tribe (Kobra Moon, Daga and Jeremiah Snake) (c) defeated Ivelisse, XO Lishus and Joey Ryan / Trios match for the Lucha Underground Trios Championship; 3 / Jake Strong defeated Drago and Aero Star / Nunchuck match; 4 / Pentagón Dark defeated King Cuerno, Mil Muertes and El Dragon Azteca, Jr. / Fatal Four-Way match to determine the #1 contender for the Lucha Underground Championship; (c) / – the champion(s) heading into the match
121	17	"The Moth and the Butterfly"	October 3, 2018
The Rabbit Tribe takes on XO Lishus, Ivelisse and Joey Ryan; Marty "The Moth" Martinez introduces a new associate and sends a message to his Ultima Lucha opponent; Killshot and Son of Havoc finally go one on one.: No. / Results / Stipulations; 1 / The Rabbit Tribe (The White Rabbit, Paul London and El Bunny) defeated Ivelisse, XO Lishus and Joey Ryan / Trios match; 2 / Son of Havoc defeated Killshot / Singles match; 3 / Marty "The Moth" Martinez (c) (with Reclusa) defeated Mariposa / Singles match for the Lucha Underground Championship; (c) / – the champion(s) heading into the match
122	18	"Spiders and Skeletons"	October 10, 2018
Taya Mundo returns for revenge; Ricky Mundo makes a shocking confession; two of Lucha Underground's fiercest rivals Mil Muertes and Fenix must team to take on their Ultima Lucha opponents.: No. / Results / Stipulations; 1 / Matanza Cueto defeated Taya by disqualification / Sacrifice to the Gods match; 2 / Mil Muertes and Fénix defeated Willie Mack and El Dragon Azteca, Jr. / Tornado tag team match; 3 / Ricky Mundo defeated Famous B (with The Beautiful Brenda) / Singles match; 4 / Pentagón Dark defeated Reclusa / Singles match
123	19	"Savagery"	October 17, 2018
Jake Strong talks with Cueto and makes demands; a Gift of the Gods Battle Royale takes place; The Mack battles his friend and former Trios Partner Killshot; a huge main event is made.: No. / Results / Stipulations; 1 / Jake Strong defeated Dante Fox, Aero Star, King Cuerno, PJ Black, Hernandez and Big Bad Steve / Battle Royal; The winner will decide who will be the odd person out of the Gift of the Gods Championship match; 2 / Willie Mack defeated Killshot by disqualification / Singles match; 3 / Jake Strong defeated Johnny Mundo / Singles match
124	20	"Seven to Survive"	October 24, 2018
Seven Luchadors do battle in a Seven to Survive Elimination Match for the Gift of the Gods Championship; Johnny Mundo gets some help, preparing for his match against the Monster Matanza Cueto.: No. / Results / Stipulations; 1 / Jake Strong defeated Dante Fox, King Cuerno, Aero Star, Big Bad Steve (with Famous B), PJ Black and Hernandez / Seven-way Elimination match for the vacant Gift of the Gods Championship
125	21	"Ultima Lucha Cuatro: Part 1"	October 31, 2018
Aerostar pays a visit to an old friend; 3-Way Trios Championship Elimination Match; Taya Mundo takes on Ricky Mundo; Son of Havoc battles Killshot in match where the loser must unmask.: No. / Results / Stipulations; 1 / The Reptile Tribe (Kobra Moon, Daga and Jeremiah Snake) (c) defeated Ivelisse, XO Lishus and Sammy Guevara and The Rabbit Tribe (The White Rabbit, Paul London and El Bunny) / Trios Elimination match for the Lucha Underground Trios Championship; 2 / Taya defeated Ricky Mundo / Singles match; 3 / Son of Havoc defeated Killshot / Mask vs. Mask match; (c) / – the champion(s) heading into the match
126	22	"Ultima Lucha Cuatro: Part 2"	October 31, 2018
El Dragon Azteca Jr. vs. Fenix; The Mack vs. Mil Muertes in a Death Match; Johnny Mundo vs. Matanza; Pentagón Dark vs. Marty "The Moth" in a Cero Miedo Match; The Order sets their plan in motion to destroy the Seven Aztec Tribes.: No. / Results / Stipulations; 1 / Fénix defeated El Dragon Azteca, Jr. / 2-out-of-3 Falls Count Anywhere match; 2 / Willie Mack defeated Mil Muertes / Death match; 3 / Johnny Mundo defeated Matanza Cueto / Sacrifice to the Gods match; 4 / Pentagón Dark defeated Marty "The Moth" Martinez (c) / Cero Miedo, No Disqualification match for the Lucha Underground Championship; 5 / Jake Strong defeated Pentagón Dark (c) / Singles match for the Lucha Underground Championship; This was Jake Strong's Gift of the Gods Championship cash-in; (c) / – the champion(s) heading into the match
