= List of Lucha Underground tournaments =

Lucha Underground has held a number of professional wrestling tournaments involving wrestlers that are a part of their roster as part of their television series.

== Tournaments ==
=== Trios Tournament ===
==== Lucha Underground Trios Championship Tournament (2015) ====
Lucha Underground held a tournament to determine which team of three wrestlers would become the first to hold Lucha Underground Trios Championship. The matches took place over four weeks, starting with Episode 21 ("Uno! Dos! Tres!) and culminating on episode 24 ("Trios Champions").

Tournament participants

- Pentagon Jr., Sexy Star and Super Fly
- Big Ryck, Killshot and Willie Mack
- Angélico, Ivelisse and Son of Havoc
- Aero Star, Drago and Fenix
- Hernandez, Johnny Mundo and Prince Puma
- Cage, King Cuerno and Texano

First round
Big Ryck, Killshot and The Mack	Pin
Pentagon Jr., Sexy Star and Super Fly
Son of Havoc, Ivelisse and Angélico	Pin
Fenix, Drago and Aero Star
King Cuerno, Cage and Texano	Pin
Prince Puma, Johnny Mundo and Hernandez

Round 2
Big Ryck, Killshot and The Mack
Son of Havoc, Ivelisse and Angélico	Pin
King Cuerno, Cage and Texano

No.	Results	Stipulations
1	Son of Havoc, Ivelisse and Angélico defeated The Crew (Bael, Cortez Castro and Mr. Cisco)	Finals of the Trios Championship Tournament, No disqualification match

==== Lucha Underground Trios Championship Tournament (2016) ====
Lucha Underground held a tournament to determine which team of three wrestlers would become the new Lucha Underground Trios Championship The matches took place over four weeks, starting with Episode 11 ("Bird of War") and culminating on episode 16 ("Graver Consequences"). The champions were allowed a bye to the finals beings the defending champions.

Tournament participants

- Mariposa, Marty Martinez and Willie Mack
- Cortez Castro, Joey Ryan and Mr. Cisco
- Angélico, Ivelisse and Son of Havoc
- Cage, Johnny Mundo and Taya
- Fenix, Jack Evans and P. J. Black
- Dragon Azteca Jr., Prince Puma and Rey Mysterio
- The Disciples of Death (Barrio Negro, El Sinestro de la Muerte and Trece).

First round
Cortez Castro, Joey Ryan and Mr. Cisco	Pin
Mariposa, Marty Martinez and Willie Mack
Dragon Azteca Jr., Prince Puma and Rey Mysterio	Pin
Cage, Johnny Mundo and Taya
Fenix, Jack Evans and P. J. Black	Pin
Barrio Negro, El Sinestro de la Muerte and Trece

Round 2
Cortez Castro, Joey Ryan and Mr. Cisco
Dragon Azteca Jr., Prince Puma and Rey Mysterio Jr.	Pin
Fenix, Jack Evans and P. J. Black

No.	Results	Stipulations
1	Dragon Azteca Jr., Prince Puma & Rey Mysterio Jr. defeated Fenix, Jack Evans & P. J. Black, and Cortez Castro, Joey Ryan & Mr. Cisco and Ivelisse and Son of Havoc (c)	Finals of the Trios Championship Tournament.
(c) / – the champion(s) heading into the match

=== Tournament 4 A Unique Opportunity (2016) ===
Semifinals
1	Willie Mack	Pin
4	Cage
3	Son of Havoc	Pin
2	Texano

Finals
The Mack	Pin
Son of Havoc

=== Battle of the Bulls Tournament ===
Lucha Underground held a tournament to determine which wrestler would become the new Lucha Underground Championship number 1 contender and face the winner of the match between Sexy Star and Johnny Mundo, which resulted to be the latter. The matches took place in fatal four-way matches over three weeks, starting with Episode 14 ("Bulls of Boyle Heights") and culminating on episode 16 ("The Battle of the Bulls").

No.	Results	Stipulations
1	Cage defeated Texano, Joey Ryan and Dr. Wagner Jr. (with Famous B and The Beautiful Brenda)	Fatal Four-Way Semifinal match
2	Willie Mack defeated Mil Muertes (with Catrina), El Dragon Azteca Jr. and Marty "The Moth" Martinez	Fatal Four-Way Semifinal match
3	Jeremiah Crane defeated Dante Fox, Killshot and Mariposa	Fatal Four-Way Semifinal match
4	P. J. Black defeated Angélico, Jack Evans and Son of Havoc	Fatal Four-Way Semifinal match
5	Willie Mack defeated P. J. Black, Jeremiah Crane and Cage	Fatal Four-Way Elimination Final match

=== The Cueto Cup ===
A 32-person tournament, part of Lucha Underground Season 3. The tournament was announced on episode 21, and began on episode 22.

1st Round
1	Aerostar
32	Drago	W
17	Pentagon Dark	W
16	Argenis
9	Willie Mack	W
24	Mala Suerte
25	Famous B
8	Texano	W
5	Vibora
28	Paul London	W
21	Veneno
12	Mil Muertes	W
13	Jeremiah Crane	W
20	Killshot
29	Joey Ryan
4	Taya	W
3	Brian Cage	W
30	Vinnie Massaro
19	Mascarita Sagrada
14	Pindar	W
11	Marty the Moth	W
22	Saltador
27	Fenix	W
6	Mariposa
7	Sexy Star
26	P. J. Black	W
23	Ricky Mandel
10	Prince Puma	W
15	El Dragon Azteca Jr.
18	Dante Fox	W
31	Son of Havoc	W
2	Son of Madness

2nd Round
Drago
Pentagon Dark	W
Willie Mack
Texano	W
Paul London
Mil Muertes	W
Jeremiah Crane	W
Taya
Brian Cage
Pindar	W
Marty the Moth
Fenix	W
P. J. Black
Prince Puma	W
Dante Fox	W
Son of Havoc

Quarterfinals
Pentagon Dark	W
Texano
Mil Muertes	W
Jeremiah Crane
Pindar
Fenix	W
Prince Puma	W
Dante Fox

Semifinals
Pentagon Dark	W
Mil Muertes
Prince Puma	W
Fenix

Finals
Pentagon Dark
Prince Puma	W

== Matches ==
=== Aztec Warfare ===
==== Aztec Warfare I ====
Lucha Underground held a 20-person intergender elimination match where a wrestler could be eliminated by pinfall or submission and has to take place inside a ring and not by throwing over the top ropes and having both feet must landing the floor. There are no count outs and no disqualifications. The match took place on October 5, 2014 and was broadcast as Episode 9 of Lucha Underground on January 7, 2015. The 20 wrestlers entered the match at timed intervals, every 90 seconds. The previous week (Episode 8, "A Unique Opportunity") Mil Muertes defeated Fénix, giving Muertes the last entrant and Fénix would start the match. In the end Prince Puma pinned Johnny Mundo to become the first ever Lucha Underground Champion.

Aztec Warfare I entrances and eliminations

Draw	Entrant	Order	Eliminated by	Elimination move
1	Fénix	15	Guerrero	Pinned after being hit over the head with a steel chair
2	Johnny Mundo	19	Puma	Pinned after a 630° senton
3	Mr. Cisco	1	Mundo	Pinned after an End of the World
4	King Cuerno	9	Mundo	Pinned with a Crucifix pin
5	Son of Havoc	4	Puma	Pinned after a Benadryller
6	Pimpinela Escarlata	2	Havoc	Pinned after a Shooting star press
7	Prince Puma	–	Winner	N/A
8	Ivelisse	3	Cuerno	Pinned after a Thrill of the Hunt
9	Drago	8	Cuerno	Pinned after a Thrill of the Hunt
10	Bael	5	Puma	Pinned after a Standing shooting star press
11	Cortez Castro	6	Mundo	Pinned after a Running knee strike
12	Ricky Mandel	7	Ryck	Pinned after a Ryck Bottom
13	Big Ryck	14	Guerrero and Fénix	Pinned after a End of the World by Mundo, a running shooting star press by Puma, and a 450 splash by Fénix
14	Pentagón Jr.	11	Guerrero	Pinned after being hit over the head with a steel chair
15	Super Fly	10	Guerrero	Pinned after being hit over the head with a steel chair
16	Chavo Guerrero Jr.	16	Star	Pinned after being hit over the head with a steel chair
17	Mascarita Sagrada	12	Ryck	Pinned after a Clothesline
18	Sexy Star	17	Muertes	Pinned after a spear
19	El Mariachi Loco	13	Muertes	Pinned after a Flatliner
20	Mil Muertes	18	Puma and Mundo	Pinned after two springboard 450° splash each from Puma and Mundo

==== Aztec Warfare II ====
Lucha Underground held the second ever Aztec Warfare match during the second season, which featured 21 participants in total with the Lucha Underground Championship at stake. The match was recorded on December 12, 2015. The match was broadcast as Episode 9 of Lucha Underground's second season on March 23, 2016.

Aztec Warfare 2 entrances and eliminations

Draw	Entrant	Order	Eliminated by	Elimination move
1	Fénix (c)	12	Matanza	Pinned after a Wrath of the Gods
2	Rey Mysterio	20	Matanza	Pinned after a Wrath of the Gods
3	King Cuerno	2	Mysterio	Submitted to a Cross armbreaker
4	Argenis	1	Mysterio	Pinned after a 619 followed by a Frog splash
5	Johnny Mundo	3	Puma	Pinned after a Standing shooting star press
6	Joey Ryan	16	Matanza	Pinned after a Triple rolling gutwrench
7	Prince Puma	19	Matanza	Pinned with a Bridging German suplex
8	Jack Evans	9	Aerostar	Pinned after a Diving front flip piledriver
9	Taya	7	Fénix	Pinned with a Bridging German suplex
10	Cage	6	Taya	Pinned after being hit over the head with a cinder block by Mundo
11	Mascarita Sagrada	5	Guerrero	Submitted to a La De A Caballo
12	Marty Martinez	4	Mysterio and Sagrada	Pinned after a Diving splash drop by Mysterio
13	Drago	8	Black	Pinned after a Brainbuster
14	Willie Mack	13	Matanza	Pinned with a Bridging German suplex
15	Chavo Guerrero Jr.	18	Matanza	Pinned after a Standing shooting star press
16	P. J. Black	10	Texano	Pinned after a Sitout powerbomb
17	Aerostar	14	Matanza	Pinned with a Bridging German suplex
18	Dragon Azteca Jr.	17	Matanza	Pinned after a Chokeslam
19	Texano	15	Matanza	Pinned after a Sitout powerbomb
20	Mil Muertes	11	Puma and Mysterio	Pinned after a Diving splash drop by Mysterio
21	Matanza Cueto	–	Winner	N/A

==== Aztec Warfare III ====
Lucha Underground held the third ever Aztec Warfare match during the third season, which featured 20 participants in total with the Lucha Underground Championship at stake. The match was recorded on April 9, 2016. The match was broadcast as Episode 11 of Lucha Underground's third season on November 16, 2016.

Aztec Warfare 3 entrances and eliminations

Draw	Entrant	Order	Eliminated by	Elimination move
1	Matanza Cueto (c)	15	Mysterio	Pinned after a Sunset flip powerbomb
2	Johnny Mundo	17	Star	Pinned after a Flying crossbody press by Angélico
3	Son of Havoc	3	Evans	Pinned after a Standing corkscrew moonsault
4	Jeremiah Crane	1	Matanza	Pinned with a Bridging German suplex
5	Pentagón Dark	4	Mundo	Pinned with a Sunset Flip Powerbomb by one of the Black Lotus Triad
6	P. J. Black	12	Mack and Star	Pinned after a Stunner by Mack
7	Mariposa	2	Matanza	Pinned with a Chokeslam
8	Rey Mysterio	16	Mundo	Pinned after a Wrath of the Gods by Matanza
9	Dr. Wagner Jr.	10	Matanza	Pinned after a Wrath of the Gods
10	Marty "The Moth" Martinez	8	Mysterio	Pinned after a Sunset Flip
11	Jack Evans	11	Mack	Pinned after a Stunner
12	Sexy Star	–	Winner	N/A
13	Ricky Mandel	5	Black	Pinned after a Package Piledriver by Pentagón
14	Mascarita Sagrada	6	Matanza	Pinned after a Wrath of the Gods
15	Famous B	7	Mysterio	Pinned after a 619 followed by a West Coast Pop
16	Willie Mack	18	Muertes	Pinned after a Flatliner
17	Joey Ryan	9	Muertes	Pinned after a Flatliner
18	Mil Muertes	19	Star	Pinned with a Diving double foot stomp
19	Kobra Moon	13	Drago	Pinned with a Crucifix pin
20	Drago	14	Matanza	Pinned with a Car Bomb Slam

==== Aztec Warfare IV ====
Lucha Underground held the fourth ever Aztec Warfare match during the fourth season, which featured 20 participants in total with the Lucha Underground Championship at stake. The match was recorded on February 24, 2018. The match was broadcast as Episode 1 of Lucha Underground's fourth season on June 13, 2018.

Aztec Warfare 4 entrances and eliminations

Draw	Entrant	Order	Eliminated by	Elimination move
1	Killshot	3	Havoc	Pinned after a Shooting star press
2	Willie Mack	1	Killshot	Pinned with a Roll-up
3	Son of Havoc	9	Pentagón	Pinned after a Back Stabber
4	Joey Ryan	2	Pentagón	Pinned after a Pentagon driver
5	Mr. Pec-Tacular	4	Pentagón	Pinned after a Superkick
6	Pentagón Dark (c)	–	Winner	N/A
7	Tommy Dreamer	6	Pentagón	Pinned after a Moonsault double foot stomp
8	Mariposa	5	Havoc	Pinned with a Cutter
9	Vinnie Massaro	7	Pentagón	Pinned after a Pentagon driver
10	Hernandez	8	Pentagón	Pinned after a Superkick and arm broken by Pentagón
11	Johnny Mundo	15	Martinez	Pinned after a Tombstone Piledriver by Vibora
12	Ricky Mundo	10	Mundo	Pinned with Moonlight Drive
13	Fenix	13	Chavo	Pinned after a Brainbuster
14	Jeremiah Crane	12	Pentagón	Pinned after a Pentagon driver
15	Mil Muertes	11	Fenix	Pinned after a Moonsault double foot stomp
16	Daga	14	Mundo	Pinned after an End of the World
17	Chavo Guerrero Jr.	18	Pentagón	Pinned after a Superkick
18	King Cuerno	17	Chavo	Pinned after a Gory bomb
19	Dragon Azteca Jr.	16	Cuerno	Pinned after a Frog splash
20	Marty "The Moth" Martinez	19	Pentagón	Pinned after a Package piledriver

=== Battle royales ===
==== Season 1 ====
Episode 8 battle royale

Order	Wrestler	Eliminated by
1	Famous B	Escarlata
2	Ricky Mandel	Bael, Cisco and Castro
3	Pimpinela Escarlata	Muertes
4	Sexy Star	Guerrero
5	Cortez Castro	Mundo
6	Mr. Cisco	Guerrero
7	Bael	Muertes
8	Chavo Guerrero Jr.	Mundo
9	Johnny Mundo	Muertes
Winner	Mil Muertes	-

Episode 37 battle royale

Order	Wrestler	Eliminated by
1	Ricky Mandel	Famous B
2	Argenis	Famous B
3	Killshot	Daivari
4	Vinnie Massaro	Daivari
5	Super Fly	Sagrada
6	Mascarita Sagrada	Himself
7	Famous B	Daivari and Martinez
8	DelAvar Daivari	Fénix
9	Marty Martinez	Fénix
Winner	Fénix	-

== Other accomplishments ==
=== Golden Aztec Medallion ===
==== Season 1 holders ====
#	Holder	Episode won	Notes
1	Fénix	S1E27 "Ancient Medallions"	Defeated Cage, Killshot, King Cuerno, Pentagón Jr, Sexy Star and Willie Mack.
2	Jack Evans	S1E30 "Submit to the Master"	Defeated Argenis
3	Aero Star	S1E33 "Death vs. the Dragon"	Defeated Cage, Marty Martinez and Willie Mack.
4	Bengala	S1E36 "The Beginning of the End"	Defeated DelAvar Daivari. Taped April 11, 2015, aired on July 15, 2015.
5	King Cuerno	S1E36 "The Beginning of the End"	Defeated Killshot. Taped April 11, 2015, aired on July 15, 2015.
6	Sexy Star	S1E36 "The Beginning of the End"	Defeated Marty Martinez, and Super Fly. Taped April 11, 2015, aired on July 15, 2015.
7	Big Ryck	S1E37 "PenUltima Lucha"	Given a medallion backstage segment. Taped April 18, 2015, aired on July 22, 2015.
1	Fénix	S1E37 "PenUltima Lucha"	Defeated Argenis, DelAvar Daivari, Famous B, Killshot, Marty Martinez, Mascarita Sagrada, Ricky Mandel, Super Fly, and Vinny Massaro. Taped April 18, 2015, aired on July 22, 2015.

==== Season 2 holders ====
#	Holder	Episode won	Notes
1	Texano	S2E12 "Three's a Crowd"	Defeated Daga
2	Aero Star	S2E13 "Monster Meets Monster"	Defeated Drago
3	Cage	S2E14 "Cage in a Cage"	Defeated Johnny Mundo in a Steel Cage match
4	Willie Mack	S2E15 "No Mas"	Defeated Marty Martinez
5	El Siniestro de la Muerte	S2E15 "No Más"	Defeated King Cuerno
3	Chavo Guerrero Jr.	S2E15 "No Más"	Stole a medallion given to Cage.
6	Sexy Star	S2E15 "No Más"	Defeated Mariposa in an "I Quit" match
7	Joey Ryan	S2E16 "Graver Consequences"	Defeated Cortez Castro and Mr. Cisco

===== Episode 22 holders =====
#	Holder	Episode won	Notes
1	Daga	S2E22 "Fame and Fortune"	Defeated Mascarita Sagrada.
2, 3, 4.	El Siniestro de la Muerte, Killshot & Marty Martinez	S2E22 "Fame and Fortune"	Defeated Cortez Castro, Mr. Cisco, and Joey Ryan
5, 6	Mariposa and Sexy Star	S2E22 "Fame and Fortune"	Defeated Ivelisse and Taya
7	NightClaw	S2E22 "Fame and Fortune"	Given a medallion backstage segment.

==== Season 3 holders ====
#	Holder	Episode won	Notes
1, 2, 3	Paul London, Saltador and Mala Suerte	S3E30 "Bloodlines"	Defeated P. J. Black, Taya and Ricky Mandel
4	Son of Havoc	S3E33 "Havoc Running Wild"	Defeated Son of Madness in a Biker's Brawl match
5	Drago	S3E34 "Career Opportunities"	Defeated Willie Mack
6	Cortez Castro	S3E34 "Career Opportunities"	Defeated Joey Ryan in a 5-0 Street Fight
7	Pentagón Dark	S3E35 "Cien"	Defeated El Dragon Azteca Jr.

==== Season 4 holders ====
#	Holder	Episode won	Notes
1	El Dragon Azteca Jr.	S4E2 "Darkness and the Monster"	Defeated Drago
2	King Cuerno	S4E4 "Pain, Love and Sacrifice to the Gods"	Defeated Chavo Guerrero Jr.
3	Ivelisse	S4E5 "Sacrificio"	Defeated Joey Ryan
4	Willie Mack	S4E5 "Sacrificio"	Defeated Son of Havoc and Killshot
5	Son of Havoc	S4E5 "Sacrificio"	Earned a Medallion for not getting pinned in the three-way match.
6	Mil Muertes	S4E5 "Sacrificio"	Defeated Cage
7	Dezmond X	S4E6 "Break the Machine"	Defeated Paul London

== See also ==
- Professional wrestling tournament
