= Argenis (wrestler) =

Mexican professional wrestler

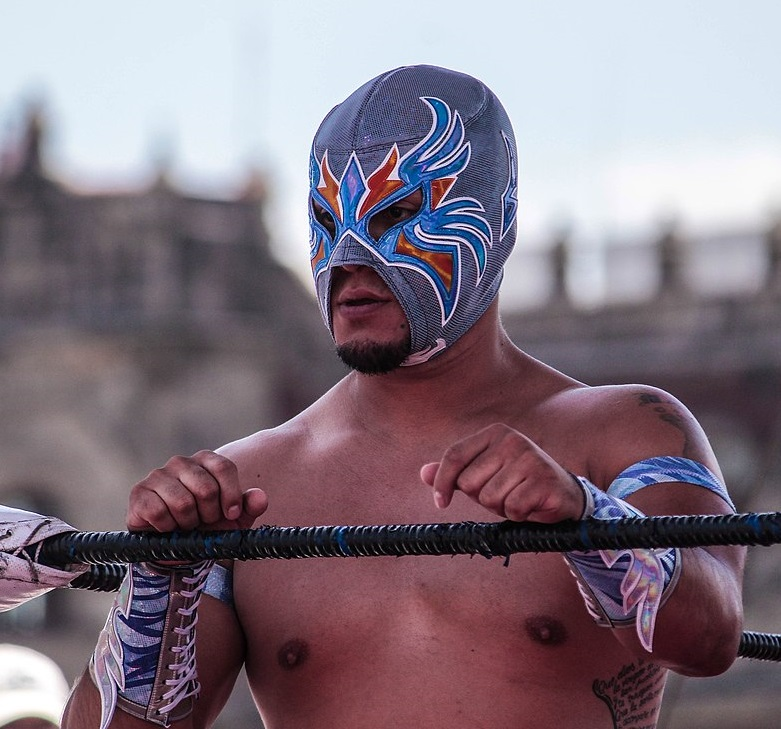
- Argenis in 2018

Personal information
- Born: Mirzha Adán Uribe Nava; August 13, 1986 (age 40) Mexico City, Mexico

Professional wrestling career
- Ring name(s): Argenis; Barrio Negro; Dr. Karonte Jr. I Hijo del Dr. Karonte
- Billed height: 1.80 m (5 ft 11 in)
- Billed weight: 81 kg (179 lb)
- Trained by: Gran Apache
- Debut: 2006

Mirzha Adán Uribe Nava (born August 13, 1986) is a Mexican professional wrestler, known for his work with Lucha Libre AAA Worldwide (AAA) under the ring name Argenis. His ring name is the Latin word for Silver. Argenis is the son of deceased professional wrestler Dr. Karonte and has wrestled as Dr. Karonte Jr. in the past, as well as Hijo del Dr. Karonte (Spanish for "Son of Dr. Karonte"). Until 2023, Argenis' real name was not a matter of public record, as is often the case with masked wrestlers in Mexico where their private lives are kept a secret from the wrestling fans. He is the brother of professional wrestlers Místico, Astro Boy, Argos, and Mini Murder Clown.

== Professional wrestling career ==
=== Early career (2006–2015) ===
Argenis made his professional wrestling debut in 2006, working as "Dr. Karonte Jr.", named after his father. He would also work as "Hijo del Dr. Karonte", neither gimmick led to much success. By 2007 he began working for Consejo Mundial de Lucha Libre (CMLL) as a Rudo (heel or "bad guy") After he left CMLL he complained to several magazines that he felt that his brother Místico should have asked CMLL to give him more opportunities. After leaving CMLL he began working for International Wrestling Revolution Group (IWRG), but again met only with limited success, even after he became a tecnico (face or "good guy").

=== Lucha Libre AAA Worldwide (2008–2024) ===
In 2008 he was a part of a 30 man group of young wrestlers that got a tryout with Asistencia Asesoría y Administración (AAA) head trainer Gran Apache. Argenis was one of only six wrestlers that made it through the rigorous trial period and won a match against the other five that gave him a job with AAA. The week after his tryout match he made his real AAA debut, working for the first time as Argenis, teaming with Pimpinela Escarlata, Cassandro and Billy Boy against Los Night Queens. Argenis was initially pushed as the "disgruntled brother of Místico". The push was soon halted as Argenis was nowhere near as talented in the ring as Místico and the comparison actually hurt Argenis' chances of the fans getting behind him. By the end of 2008 Argenis rarely worked televised matches, instead working with AAA trainers to improve in the ring. In early 2009 Argenis slowly returned to AAA television, often teaming with Real Fuerza Aérea in trios matches with Real Fuerza Aérea members Laredo Kid, Aero Star and Super Fly, but was not officially a member of the group. By mid-2009, after Real Fuerza Aérea member El Ángel left AAA Argenis was finally made an official member of the group. On September 26, 2009 Argenis made his first appearance at one of AAA's major shows as he teamed with Real Fuerza Aérea members Atomic Boy and Laredo Kid to defeat Poder del Norte (Rio Bravó, Tigre Cota, and Tito Santana) in the opening match of Heroes Inmortales III, in a Lucha a Oscuras or a "Glow in the Dark" six-man tag team match that took place under a blacklight with the wrestlers wearing fluorescent outfits. In June 2011, Argenis' brother Astro Boy II joined AAA and Real Fuerza Aérea under the new ring name Argos. On February 10, 2012, Argos turned on Argenis and Real Fuerza Aérea to join rudo group El Consejo. On August 11, 2013, Argenis and fellow AAA worker Drago made their debuts for All Japan Pro Wrestling in Tokyo, defeating Kenso and Sushi in a tag team match. Even before their first match in the promotion, Argenis and Drago were named the number one contenders to the All Asia Tag Team Championship, held by Burning members Atsushi Aoki and Kotaro Suzuki. In the build-up to the August 25 title match, Argenis and Drago began working against the Burning stable, defeating Aoki and Yoshinobu Kanemaru on August 14 and Suzuki and Kanemaru on August 16. On August 25, Argenis and Drago failed in their attempt to capture the All Asia Tag Team Championship from Aoki and Suzuki. On April 18, 2016, Argenis teamed up with Australian Suicide and won a four-way match to become No.1 contenders to the AAA World Tag Team Championship. The two received their shot on April 29, where they were unsuccessful in winning the titles. On March 19, 2017, Argenis won the 2017 Rey de Reyes.

On August 10, 2019, Argenis turned rudo (heel) betraying his partners Dinastía and Niño Hamburguesa in a match against El Nuevo Poder del Norte (Mocho Cota Jr., Carta Brava Jr., and Tito Santana). On September 9, Argenis started a feud against Myzteziz Jr., deeming Myzteziz Jr. an imposter for portraying a character that his brother previously portrayed in AAA. On April 16, 2023, at Triplemanía XXXI: Monterrey, Myzteziz Jr. defeated Argenis in a Lucha de Apuestas Mask vs. Mask match. After the match, Argenis unmasked and revealed his birth name as Mirzha Adán Uribe Nava.

On May 30, 2024, he left the promotion.

=== Lucha Underground (2015–2017) ===
Argenis made his televised for Lucha Underground on the January 14, 2015 episode in a four-way elimination match against Angélico, Aero Star, and Cage. Cage won the match by eliminating all three men. Two weeks later, The Crew (Cortez Castro, Mr. Cisco, and Bael) defeated Argenis, Aero Star, and Super Fly in a trios match. On the January 24, 2015 episode, Pentagón Jr. broke (kayfabe) Argenis' arm. After returning from his broken arm, Argenis was used on the program as a jobber and only appeared sporadically.

Starting at the end of Season 1, Argenis also began portraying the Barrio Negro character. Barrio Negro was a member of a team called The Disciples of Death, along with his partners Trece and Sinestro de la Muerte. On the July 28, 2015 episode, The Disciples of Death defeated Angélico, Son of Havoc, and Ivelisse to win the Lucha Underground Trios Championship. They lost the title in a rematch between the two teams on November 22. On the April 20, 2016 episode, Barrio Negro and Trece were killed off when Sinestro de la Muerte turned on his former partners, ripping their hearts out of their chests. It was never acknowledged on air that Barrio Negro and Argenis were the same person.

In Season 3, Uribe began portraying the Argenis character again. He did not appear at all during Season 4, and it is unknown if he was still employed by Lucha Underground when it ceased operations in 2018.

== Other media ==
In February 2017, Argenis took part in a skit on Conan, welcoming Conan O'Brien to Mexico.

== Championships and accomplishments ==
- Lucha Libre AAA Worldwide
  - Rey de Reyes (2017)
- Lucha Underground
  - Lucha Underground Trios Championship (1 time) – with El Siniestro de la Muerte and Trece
- Pro Wrestling Illustrated
  - PWI ranked him #296 of the top 500 singles wrestlers in the PWI 500 in 2015

== Luchas de Apuestas record ==
Winner (wager)	Loser (wager)	Location	Event	Date	Notes
Myzteziz Jr. (mask)	Argenis (mask)	Monterrey	Triplemanía XXXI: Monterrey	April 16, 2023	
