= Ultima Lucha Cuatro =

- Lucha Underground episodes
- Episode nos.: Season 4 Episodes 21–22
- Presented by: Commentators: Matt Striker; Vampiro; Ring announcer: Melissa Santos; Shaul Guerrero
- Original air dates: Part 1: October 31, 2018; Part 2: November 7, 2018
- Running time: Part 1: 1 Hour; Part 2: 2 Hours

Guest appearance
- Lucha Underground personnel

Episode chronology
← Previous "Ultima Lucha Tres"	Next → —

"Ultima Lucha Cuatro" (Spanish for Last Fight Four) is the name of the final episodes of the fourth season of professional wrestling TV series Lucha Underground. The first part of Ultima Lucha Cuatro (episode 21) premiered on the El Rey Network on October 31, 2018 and the second part (and Season 4 finale) was broadcast November 7 on the El Rey Network and later shown in Mexico with Spanish commentary on the UniMás network. The episodes are the climax of several ongoing storylines that played out throughout the fourth season of Lucha Underground. As part of the season finale, all three of the Lucha Underground championships were on the line.

== Event ==
For both parts of Ultima Lucha Cuarto, the commentators were Matt Striker and Vampiro, and the ring announcers were Melissa Santos and Shaul Guerrero.

== Match card ==
=== Part 1 ===
No.	Results	Stipulations	Times
1	The Reptile Tribe (Kobra Moon, Daga and Jeremiah Snake) (c) defeated Ivelisse, XO Lishus and Sammy Guevara and The Rabbit Tribe (The White Rabbit, Paul London and El Bunny)	Trios Elimination match for the Lucha Underground Trios Championship	12:01
2	Taya defeated Ricky Mundo	Singles match	4:10
3	Son of Havoc defeated Killshot	Mask vs. Mask match	14:09
(c) / – the champion(s) heading into the match

=== Part 2 ===
No.	Results	Stipulations	Times
1	Fénix defeated El Dragon Azteca, Jr.	2-out-of-3 Falls Count Anywhere match	15:20
2	Willie Mack defeated Mil Muertes	Death match	12:53
3	Johnny Mundo defeated Matanza Cueto	Sacrifice to the Gods match	11:54
4	Pentagón Dark defeated Marty "The Moth" Martinez (c)	Hardcore Cero Miedo match for the Lucha Underground Championship	12:46
5	Jake Strong defeated Pentagón Dark (c)	Singles match for the Lucha Underground Championship; This was Jake Strong's Gift of the Gods Championship cash-in	0:42
(c) / – the champion(s) heading into the match
