= Lucha Underground Gift of the Gods Championship =

Professional wrestling championship

- The championship belt with all seven medallions in place

Details
- Promotion: Lucha Underground
- Date established: April 19, 2015
- Date retired: March 19, 2018
Statistics
- First champion(s): Fénix
- Final champion(s): Jake Strong
- Most reigns: Fénix (2 reigns)
- Longest reign: Fénix (209 days)
- Shortest reign: Marty Martinez (<1 day)
- Oldest champion: Chavo Guerrero Jr. (45 years, 6 days)
- Youngest champion: Fénix (24 years, 110 days)
- Heaviest champion: Cage (128.5 kg (283 lb))
- Lightest champion: Fénix (74 kg (163 lb))

The Gift of the Gods Championship was a professional wrestling championship promoted by Lucha Underground. Unlike most traditional professional wrestling championships, the Gift of the Gods Championship is promoted by what it grants the champion instead of being the main prize in itself; holding the Gift of the Gods Championship entitles the champion to a match for the Lucha Underground Championship at a time of their choosing, provided they give a one-week notice to properly promote such a high-profile match. The concept is similar to the WWE Money in the Bank contract that also grants a title match at the winner's option, but unlike Money in the Bank, it does not allow for an immediate championship match. If the Gift of the Gods champion redeems the championship for a Lucha Underground Championship match, the medallions are removed and redistributed to determine the competitors for the now vacant title.

== Background ==
In season 1, episode 27 ("Ancient Medallions") Dario Cueto, the storyline owner of Lucha Underground, revealed that he had gathered seven ancient Aztec medallions during a taped segment. He explained that they represented the seven tribes of the ancient Aztec world and that whoever held all seven of them would gain a "gift from the gods". Later on he ordered seven wrestlers to come to the ring; Cage, Fénix, Killshot, King Cuerno, Pentagón Jr, Sexy Star and Willie Mack. The winner of the seven-way match would win the first of seven medallions. Fénix won the match and the first of the medallions. In episode 30 ("Submit to the Master") Cueto announced that Jack Evans and Argenis would wrestle for the second of the medallions in a match that Jack Evans won. Episodes showing how the remaining five medallions were awarded has not yet aired, but reports from the taping of the final match revealed that Aero Star, Bengala, Big Ryck, King Cuerno and Sexy Star win the remaining medallions at some point prior to episode 39 Ultima Lucha. During Ultima Lucha Cueto revealed that the seven medallions all slotted into a wrestling championship called the "Gift of the Gods Championship", which would grant the champion a match for the Lucha Underground Championship any time they wanted, provided they gave Cueto a week's notice so he could promote the match. Fénix outlasted the other six competitors and won the Gift of the Gods Championship After the Gift of the Gods Champion is vacated to challenge for the Lucha Underground Championship, the medallions are redistributed among the roster and the seven winners face off to determine a new champion.

== Title history ==
Key
No.	Overall reign number
Reign	Reign number for the specific champion
Days	Number of days held
<1	Reign lasted less than a day
+	Current reign is changing daily

No.	Champion	Championship change			Reign statistics		Notes	Ref.
No.	Champion	Date	Event	Location	Reign	Days	Notes	Ref.
1	Fénix	April 19, 2015	Ultima Lucha	Boyle Heights, CA	1	209	Defeated Aero Star, Bengala, Big Ryck, Jack Evans, King Cuerno and Sexy Star to become the inaugural champion. This episode aired on tape delay on August 5, 2015.	
2	King Cuerno	November 14, 2015	Lucha Underground	Boyle Heights, CA	1	7	This episode aired on tape delay on January 27, 2016.	
3	Fénix	November 21, 2015	Lucha Underground	Boyle Heights, CA	2	1	This was a ladder match. The episode aired on tape delay on March 2, 2016.	
—	Vacated	November 22, 2015	Lucha Underground	Boyle Heights, CA	—	—	Vacated when Fénix cashed in his shot at the Lucha Underground Champion Mil Muertes. This episode aired on tape delay on March 16, 2016.	
4	Chavo Guerrero Jr.	January 10, 2016	Lucha Underground	Boyle Heights, CA	1	6	Defeated Aero Star, El Siniestro de la Muerte, Joey Ryan, Sexy Star, Texano, and Willie Mack for the vacant championship. This episode aired on tape delay on May 18, 2016.	
5	Cage	January 16, 2016	Lucha Underground	Boyle Heights, CA	1	1	This episode aired on tape delay on May 25, 2016.	
—	Vacated	January 17, 2016	Lucha Underground	Boyle Heights, CA	—	—	Vacated when Cage cashed in his shot at the Lucha Underground Champion Matanza Cueto.	
6	Sexy Star	January 31, 2016	Ultima Lucha Dos	Boyle Heights, CA	1	48	Sexy Star became the first female talent to hold the title. She defeated Daga, El Siniestro de la Muerte, Killshot, Mariposa, Marty Martinez and Nightclaw, to win the vacant championship.	
7	Johnny Mundo	March 19, 2016	Lucha Underground	Boyle Heights, CA	1	22	This episode aired on tape delay on October 26, 2016.	
—	Vacated	April 10, 2016	Lucha Underground	Boyle Heights, CA	—	—	Vacated when Johnny Mundo cashed in his match for the Lucha Underground Champion Sexy Star. This episode aired on tape delay on November 23, 2016.	
8	Pentagón Dark	June 25, 2016	Ultima Lucha Tres	Boyle Heights, CA	1	1	Defeated Son of Havoc in a ladder match for the vacant title. This episode aired on tape delay on October 11, 2017.	
—	Vacated	June 26, 2016	Ultima Lucha Tres	Boyle Heights, CA	—	—	Vacated when Pentagón Dark cashed in his match for the Lucha Underground Champion Prince Puma. This episode aired on tape delay on October 18, 2017.	
9	El Dragon Azteca Jr.	March 1, 2018	Lucha Underground	Los Angeles, CA	1	9	This was a Three Way Match including Dezmond X and King Cueno for the vacant title. This episode aired on tape delay on July 25, 2018.	
10	Marty Martinez	March 10, 2018	Lucha Underground	Los Angeles, CA	1	<1	This episode aired on tape delay on September 19, 2018.	
—	Vacated	March 10, 2018	Lucha Underground	Los Angeles, CA	—	—	Vacated when Martinez cashed in his match for the Lucha Underground Champion Pentagón Dark. This episode aired on tape delay on September 19, 2018.	
11	Jake Strong	March 17, 2018	Ultima Lucha Cuatro	Los Angeles, CA	1	1	Defeated King Cuerno, Big Bad Steve, Aero Star, Hernandez, PJ Black, and Dante Fox for the vacant championship. This episode aired on tape delay on October 24, 2018.	
—	Vacated	March 18, 2018	Ultima Lucha Cuatro	Los Angeles, CA	—	—	Vacated when Strong cashed in his match for the Lucha Underground Champion Pentagón Dark. This episode aired on tape delay on November 7, 2018.	
—	Deactivated	March 19, 2018	—	—	—	—	Date of the last Lucha Underground taping.	

== Combined reigns ==
Rank	Wrestler	No. of reigns	Combined days
1	Fénix	2	210
2	Sexy Star	1	48
3	Johnny Mundo	1	22
4	El Dragon Azteca Jr.	1	9
5	King Cuerno	1	7
6	Chavo Guerrero Jr.	1	6
7	Cage	1	1
7	Pentagón Dark	1	1
7	Jake Strong	1	1
10	Marty Martinez	1	<1
