= Ultima Lucha Dos =

- Lucha Underground episodes
- The official logo for Ultima Lucha Dos
- Episode nos.: Season 2 Episodes 24–26
- Original air dates: Part 1: July 6, 2016; Part 2: July 13, 2016; Part 3: July 20, 2016
- Running time: Part 1: 1 Hour; Part 2: 1 Hour; Part 3: 2 Hours

Guest appearance
- Lucha Underground personnel

Episode chronology
| ← Previous "Ultima Lucha 1" | Next → "Ultima Lucha Tres" |

"Ultima Lucha Dos" (Spanish for Last Fight Two) is the name of the final episodes of the second season of professional wrestling TV series Lucha Underground. The first part of Ultima Lucha Dos (episode 24) premiered on the El Rey Network on July 6, 2016. The second part (episode 25) was shown on July 13 and the third part (and Season 2 finale) was broadcast July 20 on the El Rey Network and later shown in Mexico with Spanish commentary on the UniMás network. The episodes are the climax of several ongoing storylines that played out throughout the second season of Lucha Underground. As part of the season finale all three of the Lucha Underground championships were on the line. The episodes were taped on January 30 and 31, 2016.

== Event ==
For all three parts of Ultima Lucha Dos the commentators were Matt Striker and Vampiro, the ring announcer was Melissa Santos, and El Conjunto Nueva Ola was the musical guest.

=== Part 1 ===
Part 1 consisted solely of the "Tournament 4 a Unique Opportunity". No stipulations were revealed prior to the event, and what specifically the "Unique Opportunity" entailed was not revealed until the end of the tournament. Dario Cueto announced the stipulations for each tournament match live moments before they began. Willie Mack and Cage faced the same stipulation as their match at the original Ultima Lucha event, Falls Count Anywhere. Texano and Son of Havoc faced off in a Bar Fight. Son of Havoc and Willie Mack advanced to the tournament final, which was also a Falls Count Anywhere match. Son of Havoc won the tournament and Dario Cueto revealed the prize to be a choice between $250,000 and a contract for a Lucha Underground championship match at Ultima Lucha Tres, but he would have to wrestle one last opponent before receiving it. Famous B came out and introduced his new client, the debuting Dr. Wagner Jr. who defeated Son of Havoc. After which Famous B accepted the $250,000 on behalf of his client.

=== Part 2 ===
Part 2 consisted of the Gift of the Gods Championship match and King Cuerno vs Mil Muertes. During the elimination match for the Gift of the Gods Championship, Night Claw made his in-ring debut for Lucha Underground. Sinestro de la Muerte was the first eliminated by Night Claw. The second was Daga, also eliminated by Night Claw. Night Claw was the third to be eliminated, by Killshot. Mariposa eliminated Killshot next. Mariposa was eliminated by Sexy Star. Sexy Star would win the match by last eliminating Marty Martinez, by submission. Mil Muertes defeated King Cuerno in the main event of Part 2.

=== Part 3 ===
Ultima Lucha Dos Part 3 kicked off with the Lucha Underground Trios Championship. During, Drago, Fenix. and Aero Star defeated the World Wide Underground to win the championships. The second match between El Dragon Azteca Jr. and Black Lotus ended in a no contest after Pentagon Dark broke both of their arms. After the match, Pentagon demanded his Lucha Underground Championship match with Matanza Cueto immediately. During the match, Pentagon's "master" Vampiro gave Pentagon a barbed wire bat however, Cueto used it on Pentagon for the victory. The next match was Taya vs Ivelisse. Taya won the match after interference from Catrina. In the main event of Ultima Lucha Dos Part 3, Rey Mysterio defeated Prince Puma. After the match, Mysterio showed a great sign of respect to Puma by shaking his hand and leaving the ring to Puma. In the closing moments of the show, Pentagon returned to ringside, attacking Vampiro. Pentagon left Vampiro bloody and claimed he is the master now. After the show ended there was footage of Dario Cueto being escorted out of The Temple and riding in the back of a cop car.

== Results ==
=== Part 1 ===
| No. | Results | Stipulations | Times |
|---|---|---|---|
| 1 | Willie Mack defeated Cage | Falls Count Anywhere semifinal match in "The Tournament 4 a Unique Opportunity" | 10:12 |
| 2 | Son of Havoc defeated Texano | Bar Fight semifinal in "The Tournament 4 a Unique Opportunity" | 7:21 |
| 3 | Son of Havoc defeated The Mack | Falls Count Anywhere final match in "The Tournament 4 a Unique Opportunity" | 5:34 |
| 4 | Dr. Wagner Jr. (with Famous B and The Beautiful Brenda) defeated Son of Havoc | Singles match for Son of Havoc's Unique Opportunity | 2:04 |

==== The Tournament 4 a Unique Opportunity Bracket ====
Semifinals
1 | Willie Mack | Pin
4 | Cage
3 | Son of Havoc | Pin
2 | Texano

Finals
The Mack | Pin
Son of Havoc

=== Part 2 ===
| No. | Results | Stipulations | Times |
|---|---|---|---|
| 1 | Sexy Star defeated Marty Martinez, Mariposa, Killshot, Night Claw, Daga and Sinestro de la Muerte | Seven-way elimination match for the vacant Gift of the Gods Championship | 17:55 |
| 2 | Mil Muertes (with Catrina) defeated King Cuerno | Death match | 13:48 |

=== Part 3 ===
| No. | Results | Stipulations | Times |
|---|---|---|---|
| 1 | Aero Star, Drago and Fénix defeated Worldwide Underground (Jack Evans, Johnny Mundo and PJ Black) (c) | Trios match for the Lucha Underground Trios Championship | 11:50 |
| 2 | El Dragon Azteca Jr. vs. Black Lotus ended in a no contest | Singles match | 4:10 |
| 3 | Matanza Cueto (c) (with Dario Cueto) defeated Pentagón Dark | Singles match for the Lucha Underground Championship | 11:29 |
| 4 | Taya defeated Ivelisse | Singles match | 6:48 |
| 5 | Rey Mysterio defeated Prince Puma | Singles match | 16:37 |
(c) / – the champion(s) heading into the match
