= Luis Fernandez-Gil =

Spanish actor

- Born: Madrid, Spain
- Occupation: Actor
- Years active: 2003–present
- Professional wrestling career
- Ring name(s): Antonio Cueto; Cesar Duran; Dario Cueto
- Debut: 2014

Luis Fernandez-Gil is a Spanish actor and professional wrestling personality. In the 2000s and 2010s, Fernandez-Gil appeared in films including The Boys & Girls Guide to Getting Down and Jack and Jill, as well as television shows including The Mentalist and Punk'd. He is also known for portraying the non-wrestler characters Dario Cueto and his father Antonio Cueto on the professional wrestling television series Lucha Underground. Fernandez-Gil is currently signed to the Major League Wrestling promotion, where he performs under the ring name Cesar Duran.

== Acting career ==
During the 2000s and 2010s, the films Fernandez-Gil has acted in included Asian Stories (Book 3), The Boys & Girls Guide to Getting Down and Jack and Jill; the television shows Fernandez-Gil has acted in include The Mentalist, Mike & Molly, Punk'd and Ray Donovan.

== Professional wrestling career ==
=== Lucha Underground (2014–2018) ===
Fernandez-Gil portrayed the character of Dario Cueto in the professional wrestling television series Lucha Underground, as the on screen authority that is the owner and promoter of Lucha Underground. El Rey Network, which airs Lucha Underground, described the character as Lucha Underground's "proprietor" with characteristic "bloodlust" and "seemingly endless amounts of money". It also added that Cueto's "crowning achievement" is his Temple in Boyle Heights, in reference to the warehouse where both seasons of the television series have been filmed.

The first taping of Lucha Underground occurred on 6 September 2014, with Cueto debuting in the series' first episode on 29 October 2014. Cueto had made an earlier appearance with a speech at Triplemanía XXII in 2014 where he invited the luchadores of AAA to participate in his Temple.

On 17 December 2014 episode, Cueto introduced the Lucha Underground Championship, declaring that the winner of his created Aztec Warfare match would be the new champion. On the 1 April 2015 episode, Cueto introduced the Lucha Underground Trios Championship and started a tournament to crown the inaugural champions.

On the 27 May 2015 episode, Cueto ordered that for their failings, one of the Crew would be sacrificed to Cueto's brother. Cortez Castro and Mr. Cisco turned on Bael, assisting in the implied killing by Cueto's brother. On the next episode, Cueto imprisoned Black Lotus for trying to kill his brother. Lotus was captured by Chavo Guerrero and the Crew, as Guerrero betrayed Lotus to Cueto in exchange for protection from Mexican enemies.

At part one of Lucha Underground's Ultima Lucha, Cueto admitted to Black Lotus that his brother is "the Monster" Matanza, forced by their father to partake in underground fighting. He claimed that it was El Dragon Azteca who had killed Lotus' parents while framing Matanza for the deed. Despite Azteca trying to save Lotus, Lotus attacked and seemingly killed Azteca on part two of Ultima Lucha on 5 August 2015, also the first season finale. Cueto then freed Lotus, claiming that Azteca's death had endangered them and they needed to leave, so Cueto and Lotus fled along with Matanza, while the show closed with the Temple being abandoned.

In the second season he's revealed to be hiding in an old warehouse along with Black Lotus and Matanza, luring people to feed Matanza. Dario returns at the 2nd Aztec Warfare with Matanza, declaring him the final person in the match. From there he resumes his duty of Lucha Underground owner and manager of Matanza. At the end of Ultima Lucha 3 Dario is seemingly shot to death, but not before using his final moments to make a call to his father.

In season 4, Fernandez-Gil played Antonio Cueto, the father of Dario Cueto, again as the on-screen authority.

=== Major League Wrestling (2021–present) ===
On the 5 May 2021 episode of Fusion, Fernandez-Gil debuted for Major League Wrestling (MLW) as the leader of the Azteca Underground stable under the ring name Cesar Duran.

As leader of Azteca Underground, Duran headed MLW Azteca, a miniseries where he made feuds and matches to his pleasure. Duran was later declared the matchmaker of MLW.

== Personal life ==
Fernandez-Gil holds a black belt in judo.

== Filmography ==
Television
Year	Title	Role	Notes
2007	Punk'd	Field Agent	Season 8, 8 episodes
2014	Mike and Molly	Enrique	Season 4, episode 11
2014	The Mentalist	Ambassador Moreno	Season 6, episode 21
2014	Ray Donovan	Boxing referee	Season 2, Episodes 1 & 2
2014–2018	Lucha Underground	Dario Cueto & Antonio Cueto	105 episodes
2015–2016	Telenovela	Director	8 episodes
2016	It's Always Sunny in Philadelphia	Doctor Krause	Season 11, episode 6
2016	Angie Tribeca	Bank Manager	Season 1, episode 9
2016	You're the Worst	Preacher	Season 3, episode 1
2016	Club de Cuervos	Ricky Lamas	
2020	Curb Your Enthusiasm	Restaurant Host	Season 10, Episode 3
2021–present	MLW Fusion	Cesar Duran	
2022	This Fool	Priest	
2023	Mayans M.C.	Elio	Season 5, 5 episodes
2023–present	MLW Underground Wrestling	Cesar Duran	

Film
Year	Title	Role	Notes
2006	The Boys and Girls Guide to Getting Down		
2008	Asian Stories (Book 3)		
2009	Now & Later	Luis	
2011	Jack and Jill	Italian Cruise Ship Director	
2016	Joshy	The Spaniard	
2016	Rules Don't Apply	Somoza's Aide	
2016	She's Allergic to Cats	Huber	
2016	Stevie D	Maitre D Ricardo	
2016	Sammy-Gate	Bebe Rebozo	
2020	Horse Girl	Tow Worker	
2021	Supercool	Officer Ramirez	

Video games
Year	Title	Role	Notes
2016	Uncharted 4: A Thief's End	Additional voices	Voice role

== Awards ==
- Wrestling Observer Newsletter
  - Best Non-Wrestler (2015, 2016)
