= Lucha Underground Championship =

American professional wrestling championship (2014–2018)

- Lucha Underground Championship belt (2014–2018)

Details
- Promotion: Lucha Underground
- Date established: October 5, 2014
- Date retired: March 19, 2018
Statistics
- First champion: Prince Puma
- Final champion: Jake Strong
- Most reigns: Prince Puma and Pentagón Dark (2 reigns)
- Longest reign: Pentagón Dark (622 days)
- Shortest reign: Prince Puma, Pentagón Dark, and Jake Strong (<1 day)
- Oldest champion: Mil Muertes (39 years, 330 days)
- Youngest champion: Fénix (24 years, 7 days)
- Heaviest champion: Jake Strong, 275 lb (125 kg)
- Lightest champion: Fénix, 163 lb (74 kg)

The Lucha Underground Championship was a professional wrestling world championship owned by the Lucha Underground promoter. The championship was the top championship of the promotion and was generally contested in professional wrestling matches, in which participants execute scripted finishes rather than in direct competition.

The championship was introduced in episode 8 ("A Unique Opportunity") taped on October 4, 2014, and broadcast on December 17, 2014, with the first champion being determined on episode 9 ("Aztec Warfare") which was taped on October 5, 2014, and broadcast on television on January 7, 2015. The final champion was Jake Strong, who won the title on the last episode of Lucha Underground.

As it was a professional wrestling championship, the title was not won by actual competition, but by a scripted ending to a match determined by the bookers and match makers. (Note: Hornbaker (2016) p. 550: "Professional wrestling is a sport in which match finishes are predetermined. Thus, win–loss records are not indicative of a wrestler's genuine success based on their legitimate abilities – but on now much, or how little they were pushed by promoters") On occasion the promotion declares a championship vacant, which means there is no champion at that point in time. This can either be due to a storyline, (Note: Duncan & Will (2000) p. 271, Chapter: Texas: NWA American Tag Team Title [World Class, Adkisson] "Championship held up and rematch ordered because of the interference of manager Gary Hart") or real life issues such as a champion suffering an injury being unable to defend the championship, (Note: Duncan & Will (2000) p. 20, Chapter: (United States: 19th Century & widely defended titles – NWA, WWF, AWA, IW, ECW, NWA) NWA/WCW TV Title "Rhodes stripped on 85/10/19 for not defending the belt after having his leg broken by Ric Flair and Ole & Arn Anderson") or leaving the company. (Note: Duncan & Will (2000) p. 201, Chapter: (Memphis, Nashville) Memphis: USWA Tag Team Title "Vacant on 93/01/18 when Spike leaves the USWA.")

== History ==
During Episode 8 ("A Unique Opportunity") of Lucha Underground's first season the storyline owner of Lucha Underground, Dario Cueto, announced that he was introducing the "top prize" in the promotion, the Lucha Underground Championship, revealing the belt to the audience in the arena and viewers at home. He explained that on the following week's show 20 wrestlers would compete in an Aztec Warfare match, featuring a mixture of male, female and Mini-Estrella competitors in the ring at the same time. During episode 8 Mil Muertes defeated Fénix in a match, earning him the number 20 spot, while forcing Fénix to be the first man in the match. Episode 9 ("Aztec Warfare") was dedicated to the championship match and saw Prince Puma pin Johnny Mundo to eliminate him from the match and become the inaugural Lucha Underground Champion. During the broadcast a couple weeks later ("They Call Him Cage") after Puma defeated Cage by disqualification to retain the championship, Cage tore the championship belt apart in a fit of anger, ripping the leather strap in half. As a result, Dario Cueto introduced a new Lucha Underground Championship belt in Episode 20 ("The Art of War") that was presented to Prince Puma.

Prince Puma retained his championship in many matches for the title against Fénix, Cage, King Cuerno, Drago, Hernandez, Johnny Mundo, and Chavo Guerrero Jr.

On Episode 31 ("The Desolation of Drago") Drago defeated King Cuerno, Cage and Hernandez to earn a match against Prince Puma at Ultima Lucha, Lucha Underground's season finale. Afterwards Cueto announced that Drago would face Mil Muertes on episode 33 for the right to challenge the champion. Episode 33 was taped on April 11, 2015 and had Muertes defeat Drago to earn the match against Prince Puma. At Ultima Lucha Mil Muertes defeated Prince Puma to win the title and end the last episode of the first season as the champion.

Overall, Prince Puma and Pentagón Dark hold the record for most reigns, with two. With 622, Pentagón Dark's first reign is the longest in the title's history. Puma's second reign, Pentagón's second reign, and Jake Strong's first reign hold the record for shortest reign in the title's history at less than one day. Overall, there have been 11 reigns shared among 9 wrestlers, with 0 vacancies.

== Reigns ==
Key
No.	Overall reign number
Reign	Reign number for the specific champion
Days	Number of days held
N/A	Unknown information
<1	Reign lasted less than a day

No.	Champion	Championship change			Reign statistics		Notes	Ref.
No.	Champion	Date	Event	Location	Reign	Days	Notes	Ref.
1	Prince Puma	October 5, 2014	Lucha Underground	Boyle Heights, California	1	196	This was a 20–man elimination Aztec Warfare match. Prince Puma lastly eliminated Johnny Mundo to become the inaugural champion. This episode aired on tape delay on January 7, 2015.	
2	Mil Muertes	April 19, 2015	Ultima Lucha 1	Boyle Heights, California	1	217	This episode aired on tape delay on August 5, 2015.	
3	Fénix	November 22, 2015	Lucha Underground	Boyle Heights, California	1	20	Cashed in his Gift of the Gods Championship on Muertes. This episode aired on tape delay on March 16, 2016.	
4	Matanza Cueto	December 12, 2015	Aztec Warfare II	Boyle Heights, California	1	119	This was a 21–man elimination Aztec Warfare match. Matanza lastly eliminated Rey Mysterio Jr. to win the championship. This episode aired on tape delay on March 23, 2016.	
5	Sexy Star	April 9, 2016	Aztec Warfare III	Boyle Heights, California	1	1	This was an Aztec Warfare match. Sexy Star lastly eliminated Mil Muertes to win the championship. This episode aired on tape delay on November 16, 2016.	
6	Johnny Mundo	April 10, 2016	Lucha Underground	Boyle Heights, California	1	77	Cashed in his Gift of the Gods Championship on Sexy Star. Aired on tape delay on November 23, 2016.	
7	Prince Puma	June 26, 2016	Ultima Lucha Tres	Boyle Heights, California	2	<1	This was a Career vs. Title match. This episode aired on tape delay on October 18, 2017.	
8	Pentagón Dark	June 26, 2016	Ultima Lucha Tres	Boyle Heights, California	1	622	Cashed in his Gift of the Gods Championship on Prince Puma. This was a "Loser Must Retire" match. This episode aired on tape delay on October 18, 2017.	
9	Marty The Moth	March 10, 2018	Lucha Underground	Los Angeles, California	1	8	Cashed in his Gift of the Gods Championship on Pentagón Dark. This episode aired on tape delay on September 19, 2018.	
10	Pentagón Dark	March 18, 2018	Ultima Lucha Cuatro	Los Angeles, California	2	<1	This episode aired on tape delay on November 7, 2018.	
11	Jake Strong	March 18, 2018	Ultima Lucha Cuatro	Los Angeles, California	1	<1	Cashed in his Gift of the Gods Championship on Pentagón Dark. This episode aired on tape delay on November 7, 2018.	
—	Deactivated	March 19, 2018	—	—	—	—	Date of the last Lucha Underground taping.	

== Combined reigns ==
Rank	Wrestler	No. of reigns	Combined days
1	Pentagón Dark	2	622
2	Mil Muertes	1	217
3	Prince Puma	2	196
4	Matanza Cueto	1	119
5	Johnny Mundo	1	77
6	Fénix	1	20
7	Marty the Moth	1	8
8	Sexy Star	1	1
9	Jake Strong	1	<1
