= Lucha Underground Trios Championship =

Professional wrestling trios tag team championship

- One of three identical belts that symbolize the championship

Details
- Promotion: Lucha Underground
- Date established: February 8, 2015
- Date retired: March 19, 2018
Statistics
- First champions: Angélico, Ivelisse & Son of Havoc
- Most reigns: Angélico, Ivelisse & Son of Havoc – Team (2 reigns); Son of Havoc – individual (3 reigns)
- Longest reign: Killshot, The Mack & Son of Havoc (608 days)
- Shortest reign: Dragon Azteca Jr., Prince Puma & Rey Mysterio (7 days)
- Oldest champion: Rey Mysterio (41 years)
- Youngest champion: Fenix (25 years)
- Heaviest champion: Dante Fox, Killshot & Willie Mack (656 lb (298 kg))
- Lightest champion: Angélico, Ivelisse & Son of Havoc (406 lb (184 kg))

The Lucha Underground Trios Championship was a professional wrestling world tag team championship promoted by Lucha Underground. In contrast to usual tag team championships for two wrestlers, it is exclusively for three-man tag teams, also known as trios in Lucha libre. The titles were announced by the storyline owner of Lucha Underground, Dario Cueto on a show that aired on January 25, 2015, followed by a trios tournament that played out over several episodes of Lucha Underground. The final champions were The Reptile Tribe (Kobra Moon, Daga & Jeremiah Snake).

As it was a professional wrestling championship, the championship was not won not by actual competition, but by a scripted ending to a match determined by the bookers and match makers. (Note: Hornbaker (2016) p. 550: "Professional wrestling is a sport in which match finishes are predetermined. Thus, win–loss records are not indicative of a wrestler's genuine success based on their legitimate abilities – but on how much, or how little they were pushed by promoters") On occasion the promotion declares a championship vacant, which means there is no champion then. This can either be due to a storyline, (Note: Duncan & Will (2000) p. 271, Chapter: Texas: NWA American Tag Team Title [World Class, Adkisson] "Championship held up and rematch ordered because of the interference of manager Gary Hart") or real-life issues such as a champion suffering an injury being unable to defend the championship, (Note: Duncan & Will (2000) p. 20, Chapter: (United States: 19th Century & widely defended titles – NWA, WWF, AWA, IW, ECW, NWA) NWA/WCW TV Title "Rhodes stripped on 85/10/19 for not defending the belt after having his leg broken by Ric Flair and Ole & Arn Anderson") or leaving the company. (Note: Duncan & Will (2000) p. 201, Chapter: (Memphis, Nashville) Memphis: USWA Tag Team Title "Vacant on 93/01/18 when Spike leaves the USWA.")

== History ==
During Season 1's episode 20 ("The Art of War") storyline owner Dario Cueto announced that he was honoring the lucha libre tradition of the Trios teams as he introduced the Lucha Underground Trios Championship and announced that the Trios title tournament would start on the following show. On Episode 21 ("Uno! Dos! Tres!") the team of Big Ryck, Killshot & Willie Mack defeated the team of Pentagón Jr., Sexy Star & Super Fly. The following week the dysfunctional team of Angélico, Ivelisse & Son of Havoc defeated Aero Star, Drago & Fénix to earn a spot in the finals. In the third week (S1E23 "Fire in the Cosmos") of the tournament Dario Cueto hand-picked the team of King Cuerno, Cage & El Texano Jr. defeated Lucha Underground Champion Prince Puma, Johnny Mundo & Hernandez to earn the third and final spot in the finals. Episode 24, named "Trios Champions" was dedicated almost exclusively to the finals of the Trios tournament. Angélico, Ivelisse & Son of Havoc won the three-way match, which was believed to be the finals. After the match was over Dario Cueto announced that it was only the semi-finals and that the winners had to face "The Crew" (Bael, Mr. Cisco & Cortez Castro) for the championship. The dysfunctional, yet popular team of Angélico, Ivelisse & Son of Havoc won the match, becoming the first holders of the Trios Championship. On the May 24, 2015 episode of Lucha Underground (Episode 28 Shoots and Ladders) the champions were forced to defend the Trios championship against the Crew despite Ivelisse being injured and in a cast. The match was a Ladder match and ended with Ivelisse climbing the ladder despite her injury to claim the belts and a successful title defense. On Episode 30 ("Submit to the Master") the champions had another successful title defense, defeating the team of Big Ryck, Cage & Delavar Daivari. Angélico, Ivelisse & Son of Havoc lost the Trios championship to The Disciples of Death (Barrio Negro, El Sinestro de la Muerte & Trece) as part of the end of the season Ultima Lucha special event. The show was taped on April 19, 2015, and aired for the first time on July 29, 2015.

== Title history ==
Key
No.	Overall reign number
Reign	Reign number for the specific team—reign numbers for the individuals are in parentheses, if different
Days	Number of days held

No.	Champion	Championship change			Reign statistics		Notes	Ref.
No.	Champion	Date	Event	Location	Reign	Days	Notes	Ref.
1	Angélico, Ivelisse and Son of Havoc	February 8, 2015	Lucha Underground	Boyle Heights, CA	1	69	Defeated The Crew (Bael, Cortez Castro and Mr. Cisco) in the finals of a tournament to become the inaugural champions. This episode aired on tape delay on April 8, 2015.	
2	The Disciples of Death (Barrio Negro, El Sinestro de la Muerte and Trece)	April 18, 2015	Ultima Lucha 1	Boyle Heights, CA	1	218	This episode aired on tape delay on July 28, 2015.	
3	Angélico, Ivelisse and Son of Havoc	November 22, 2015	Lucha Underground	Boyle Heights, CA	2	49	This episode aired on tape delay on March 16, 2016.	
4	Dragon Azteca Jr., Prince Puma and Rey Mysterio	January 10, 2016	Lucha Underground	Boyle Heights, CA	1	7	This was a four-way elimination match, also involving Fenix, Jack Evans and P. J. Black, and Cortez Castro, Joey Ryan and Mr. Cisco. This episode aired on tape delay on April 27, 2016.	
5	Worldwide Underground (Johnny Mundo, Jack Evans and P. J. Black)	January 17, 2016	Lucha Underground	Boyle Heights, CA	1	14	This episode aired on tape delay on May 25, 2016.	
6	Fénix, Drago and Aero Star	January 31, 2016	Ultima Lucha Dos	Boyle Heights, CA	1	97	This episode aired on tape delay on July 20, 2016.	
7	The Reptile Tribe (Drago, Pindar and Vibora)	May 7, 2016	Lucha Underground	Boyle Heights, CA	1 (2, 1, 1)	50	Drago pinned Aero Star during a title defense against Kobra Moon, Pindar and Vibora. This episode aired on tape delay on June 7, 2017.	
8	Willie Mack, Killshot and Dante Fox	June 26, 2016	Ultima Lucha Tres	Boyle Heights, CA	1	608	This episode aired on tape delay on October 11, 2017.	
9	Willie Mack, Killshot and Son of Havoc	February 24, 2018	Lucha Underground	Los Angeles, CA	1 (2, 2, 3)	13	This episode aired on tape delay on June 13, 2018. Dante Fox was MIA and forced to relinquish the title. The title was then given to Son of Havoc, who joined the Trio's Team as their new partner.	
10	The Reptile Tribe (Kobra Moon, Daga and Jeremiah Snake)	March 9, 2018	Lucha Underground	Los Angeles, CA	1	9	This episode aired on tape delay on August 15, 2018.	
—	Deactivated	March 19, 2018	—	—	—	—	Date of the last Lucha Underground taping.	

== Combined reigns ==
=== By team ===
Rank	Team	No. of reigns	Combined days
1	Willie Mack, Killshot and Dante Fox	1	608
2	The Disciples of Death (Barrio Negro, El Sinestro de la Muerte and Trece)	1	218
3	Angélico, Ivelisse and Son of Havoc	2	118
4	Fénix, Drago and Aero Star	1	97
5	The Reptile Tribe (Drago, Pindar and Vibora)	1	50
6	Worldwide Underground (Johnny Mundo, Jack Evans and P. J. Black)	1	14
7	Willie Mack, Killshot and Son of Havoc	1	13
8	Dragon Azteca Jr., Prince Puma and Rey Mysterio	1	7
8	The Reptile Tribe (Kobra Moon, Daga and Jeremiah Snake)	1	7

=== By wrestler ===
Rank	Wrestler	No. of reigns	Combined days
1	Willie Mack	2	621
1	Killshot	2	621
3	Dante Fox	1	608
4	Barrio Negro	1	218
4	El Sinestro de la Muerte	1	218
4	Trece	1	218
7	Drago	2	147
8	Son of Havoc	3	131
9	Angélico	2	118
9	Ivelisse	2	118
11	Fénix	1	97
11	Aero Star	1	97
13	Pindar	1	50
13	Vibora	1	50
15	Johnny Mundo	1	14
15	Jack Evans	1	14
15	P. J. Black	1	14
18	Dragon Azteca Jr.	1	7
18	Prince Puma	1	7
18	Rey Mysterio	1	7
18	Kobra Moon	1	7
18	Daga	1	7
18	Jeremiah Snake	1	7

== See also ==
- Lucha Underground Championship
- Lucha Underground Gift of the Gods Championship
