= Lucha Underground =

American professional wrestling promotion and TV series

- Genre: Professional wrestling Action drama Fantasy
- Developed by: Mark Burnett; Robert Rodriguez
- Starring: Lucha Underground roster
- Narrated by: Matt Striker; Vampiro
- Country of origin: United States
- No. of seasons: 4
- No. of episodes: 127 (list of episodes)

Production
- Executive producers: Mark Burnett; Robert Rodriguez; Eric van Wagenen; Anthony Jensen; Chris DeJoseph
- Producers: Matthew Stollman; Chris Roach; Chavo Guerrero Jr. Sue Vial; Ryan Hermosura; Nick Staller; Barry Murphy
- Production locations: Boyle Heights, California; Downtown Los Angeles, California
- Camera setup: Multicamera setup
- Running time: 60 minutes
- Production companies: United Artists Media Group; Lucha Libre AAA Worldwide; MGM Television; Rodriguez International Pictures; FactoryMade Ventures; AG Studios Content

Original release
- Network: El Rey Network
- Release: October 29, 2014 – November 7, 2018

Lucha Underground was an American professional wrestling promotion founded in 2014 by United Artists Media Group. Lucha Underground also refers to its weekly television program, which featured characters portrayed by wrestlers from Lucha Libre AAA Worldwide and the American and Mexican independent circuits. The series originally aired in English on El Rey Network and in Spanish on UniMás.

The series was developed by Mark Burnett and Robert Rodriguez and produced by United Artists, MGM Television, and One Three Media. It premiered on October 29, 2014 and aired until November 7, 2018, consisting of four seasons for a total of 127 episodes. It was set and filmed in Boyle Heights and Downtown Los Angeles, California, at 516 South Anderson Street while the series later forged creative and production partnerships with other North American promotions.

Lucha Underground received generally positive reviews throughout its run, with praise for its action, characters, and cinematic presentation, with critics noting its in-universe style and departure from depicting professional wrestling as a legitimate sporting contest. The series had moderate viewership in its first two seasons, but the third and fourth season saw fluctuations in viewership after it was made available on Netflix prior to the fourth season premiere. The series was eventually cancelled due to budget concerns.

== History ==
In January 2014, it was confirmed Mark Burnett would partner with Robert Rodriguez's El Rey Network to launch a weekly hour-long professional wrestling television series in the second half of the year; it would be affiliated with the Mexican wrestling promotion Lucha Libre AAA Worldwide (AAA). In July, it was tentatively titled Lucha: Uprising, before officially announced as Lucha Underground in August, with AAA wrestlers Blue Demon Jr., Pentagón Jr., Sexy Star, Fénix, and Drago joining the cast. It was to be narrated by Matt Striker and Vampiro and began filming on September 6 in front of a studio audience in Boyle Heights, California.

The series premiered on October 29, 2014, on the El Rey Network where it aired on Wednesdays at 8:00 p.m. E.T., and in Spanish on November 1, 2014, on UniMás where it aired on Saturdays at 4:00 p.m. E.T.

Johnny Mundo won the main event of the pilot episode. Prince Puma was the first Lucha Underground Champion after winning the first Aztec Warfare match on January 7, 2015. On April 22, Ivelisse, Son of Havoc, and Angélico became the first Lucha Underground Trios Champions after winning the inaugural Trios Tournament. The season's two-part finale, Ultima Lucha, which doubled as the promotion's first annual special event, received acclaim. Lucha Underground was subsequently renewed for a second season on September 21, 2015.

The second season began production on November 14, 2015, and premiered on January 27, 2016. Prior to filming, it was leaked the series had been renewed for a third season; El Rey announced the renewal on February 1, 2016. During this period, the Lucha Underground promotion began a collaborative partnership with the International Wrestling Syndicate (IWS), and held its first touring event, Austin Warfare, in Austin, Texas, as part of South by Southwest in 2016. The promotion was also represented by different teams at three editions of the Lucha Libre World Cup, between 2015 and 2017.

On November 10, 2017, it was announced that Lucha Underground had been renewed for a fourth season to premiere in 2018. In February 2018, filming of the series was moved to Downtown Los Angeles. The following month it was announced that the promotion had entered into a working relationship with Impact Wrestling, holding a joint promotional event on Twitch on April 6. The fourth season premiered on June 13, and concluded on November 7, after which producer Eric van Wagenen stated that the series had amassed budget concerns, and would require "a major reboot on a lot of levels" to produce a fifth season.

A fifth season was not produced in 2019, and in a 2020 interview with Chris Van Vliet, Vampiro stated the series was effectively cancelled, and the promotion dissolved.

== Championships ==
Championship	Final champion(s)	Reign	Date won	Location	Notes
Lucha Underground Championship	Jake Strong	1	March 18, 2018	Boyle Heights, Los Angeles	Defeated Pentagón Dark at Ultima Lucha Cuatro.
Gift of the Gods Championship	Jake Strong	1	March 17, 2018	Los Angeles, California	Defeated King Cuerno, Big Bad Steve, Aero Star, Hernandez, PJ Black, and A. R. Fox for the vacant Championship. Vacated once Strong cashed in at Ultima Lucha Cuatro.
Lucha Underground Trios Championship	The Reptile Tribe (Daga, Kobra Moon, and Jeremiah Snake)	1	March 9, 2018	Boyle Heights, Los Angeles	Defeated The Mack, Killshot, and Son of Havoc in a trios tornado match.

=== Other accomplishments ===
Accomplishment	Last winner	Date	Episode
Aztec Warfare	Pentagón Dark	February 24, 2018	El Jefe
The Cueto Cup	Prince Puma	June 11, 2016	The Cueto Cup
Battle of the Bulls Tournament	The Mack	April 23, 2016	The Battle Of The Bulls
Unique Opportunity Tournament	Son of Havoc	January 30, 2016	Ultima Lucha Dos
Trios Tournament	El Dragon Azteca Jr., Prince Puma, and Rey Mysterio	January 10, 2016	Cage In A Cage

== Reception ==
Lucha Underground was well received by critics. John Moore, from ProWrestling.net, praised the show for "[knowing] their identity and [weaving] together an amazing universe". Lucha Underground has also gained praise from media sites like Uproxx, which said Lucha Underground had two of the top ten matches of 2015. In 2015, the show was featured on ESPN's SportsCenter and won SoCal Uncensored's 2015 Southern California promotion of the year award, ending Pro Wrestling Guerrilla's 12 year streak of winning the award.

In comparison to WWE, Sports Illustrated described the promotion as "vastly different", with the show creating a "cinematic approach with supernatural elements and science fiction that also embeds wrestling psychology and storylines".

== Broadcasters ==
Country	Network
Canada	TLN
France	La Chaine Action
Germany	Tele 5 and TNT Serie
India	1Sports
Japan	Fighting TV Samurai
Southeast Asia	KIX
United States	El Rey Network

== Lawsuit ==
On February 6, 2019, it was reported that Jorge Luis Alcantar, who played King Cuerno, had filed a lawsuit in California against the El Rey Network and the Baba-G production company that made Lucha Underground. The lawsuit claimed that Lucha Underground's contracts "illegally restricted" wrestlers from working in their "lawful profession," by blocking them from working for other wrestling companies until their multi-year contracts expired. Production of the series ended in less than 4 years, despite producers signing some original cast member wrestlers to 5-year, exclusive contracts. Alcantar stated that wrestler pay was usually less than $1,000 per appearance, with some wrestling cast members earning only about $4,000 a year from the show.

Alcantar's lawyer also revealed that he had filed a class action lawsuit against Lucha Underground on behalf of other wrestlers, claiming their contracts, too, were illegal under California labor law. Other wrestlers Ivelisse Vélez, Joey Ryan, and Melissa Cervantes (who played Kobra Moon) joined the class, seeking to invalidate their contracts.

As of March 26, 2019, all lawsuits had been settled in the wrestlers' favor, and they were freed from their contracts.

== Legacy ==
In the Fall of 2020, Major League Wrestling (MLW) began incorporating story elements from Lucha Underground into an angle on their weekly television series, MLW Fusion. Talent formerly associated with Lucha Underground were brought into MLW as part of the "Azteca" stable, with Cesar Duran (the former Dario Cueto) and other Lucha Underground alumni appearing for the promotion. The stable would later become the central focus of MLW's mini-series, Fusion: Alpha, which premiered on September 22, 2021.

Elements of Lucha Underground have since continued to appear in MLW programming, with the promotion also holding various Azteca-branded events. The Azteca concept has been described as a spiritual successor to Lucha Underground.
