= Verano de Escándalo (2014) =

2014 Lucha Libre AAA World Wide event

- Promotional poster featuring various AAA wrestlers, including Myzteziz billed under his old ring name "Místico"
- Promotion: Lucha Libre AAA World Wide
- Date: June 7, 2014
- City: Orizaba, Veracruz
- Venue: Plaza de Toros la Concordia
- Attendance: 7,000

Event chronology
← Previous; Rey de Reyes	Next → Triplemanía XXII

Verano de Escándalo chronology
← Previous; 2011	Next → 2015

Verano de Escándalo (2014) (Spanish for "Summer of Scandal") was a professional wrestling event produced by the Lucha Libre AAA World Wide (AAA) promotion, which took place on June 7, 2014, at Plaza de Toros la Concordia in Orizaba, Veracruz, Mexico.

The event has been AAA's annual summer show since 1997, though this marked the first time the event had taken place since 2011. The event featured six matches and was headlined by the AAA in-ring debut of former Consejo Mundial de Lucha Libre and WWE wrestler Myzteziz.

== Production ==
=== Background ===
First held during the summer of 1997 the Mexican professional wrestling, company Lucha Libre AAA World Wide (AAA, or Triple A) began holding a major wrestling show during the summer, most often in September, called Verano de Escándalo ("Summer of Scandal"). The Verano de Escándalo show was an annual event from 1997 until 2011, then AAA did not hold a show in 2012 and 2013 before bringing the show back in 2014, but this time in June, putting it at the time AAA previously held their Triplemanía'show.

In 2012 and 2013 Triplemanía XX and Triplemanía XXI was held in August instead of the early summer. The show often features championship matches or Lucha de Apuestas or bet matches where the competitors risked their wrestling mask or hair on the outcome of the match. In Lucha Libre the Lucha de Apuetas match is considered more prestigious than a championship match and a lot of the major shows feature one or more Apuesta matches. The 2014 Verano de Escándalo show was the 16th show in the series.

=== Storylines ===
The Verano de Escándalo show featured six professional wrestling matches with different wrestlers involved in pre-existing, scripted feuds, plots, and storylines. Wrestlers were portrayed as either heels (referred to as rudos in Mexico, those that portray the "bad guys") or faces (técnicos in Mexico, the "good guy" characters) as they followed a series of tension-building events, which culminated in a wrestling match or series of matches.

== Results ==
No.	Results	Stipulations
1	Los Cadetes del Espacio (Aero Star, Ludxor and Venum) defeated El Apache, Carta Brava Jr. and Súper Fly	Six-man tag team match
2	El Elegido, Faby Apache, Mascarita Sagrada and Pimpinela Escarlata defeated Mamba, Mini Abismo Negro, Sexy Star and Silver King	Eight-person tag team match
3	Bengala defeated Angélico, Australian Suicide, Dark Escoria, Fénix, El Hijo del Fantasma, Jack Evans and Pentagón Jr.	Eight-way elimination match; semifinals of a tournament to determine the number one contender to the AAA Cruiserweight Championship
4	Los Mexican Power (Crazy Boy, Joe Líder and Niño Hamburguesa) defeated La Anarquía (Daga, Eterno and Steve Pain)	Six-man tag team match
5	El Texano Jr. (c) (with El Hijo del Fantasma) defeated Psycho Clown (with Mini Clown)	Singles match for the AAA Mega Championship
6	Ejercito AAA (Cibernético, Myzteziz and La Parka) defeated La Sociedad (Averno, Chessman and El Hijo del Perro Aguayo)	Six-man tag team match
(c) / – the champion(s) heading into the match
