= Rey Fénix =

Mexican professional wrestler (born 1990)

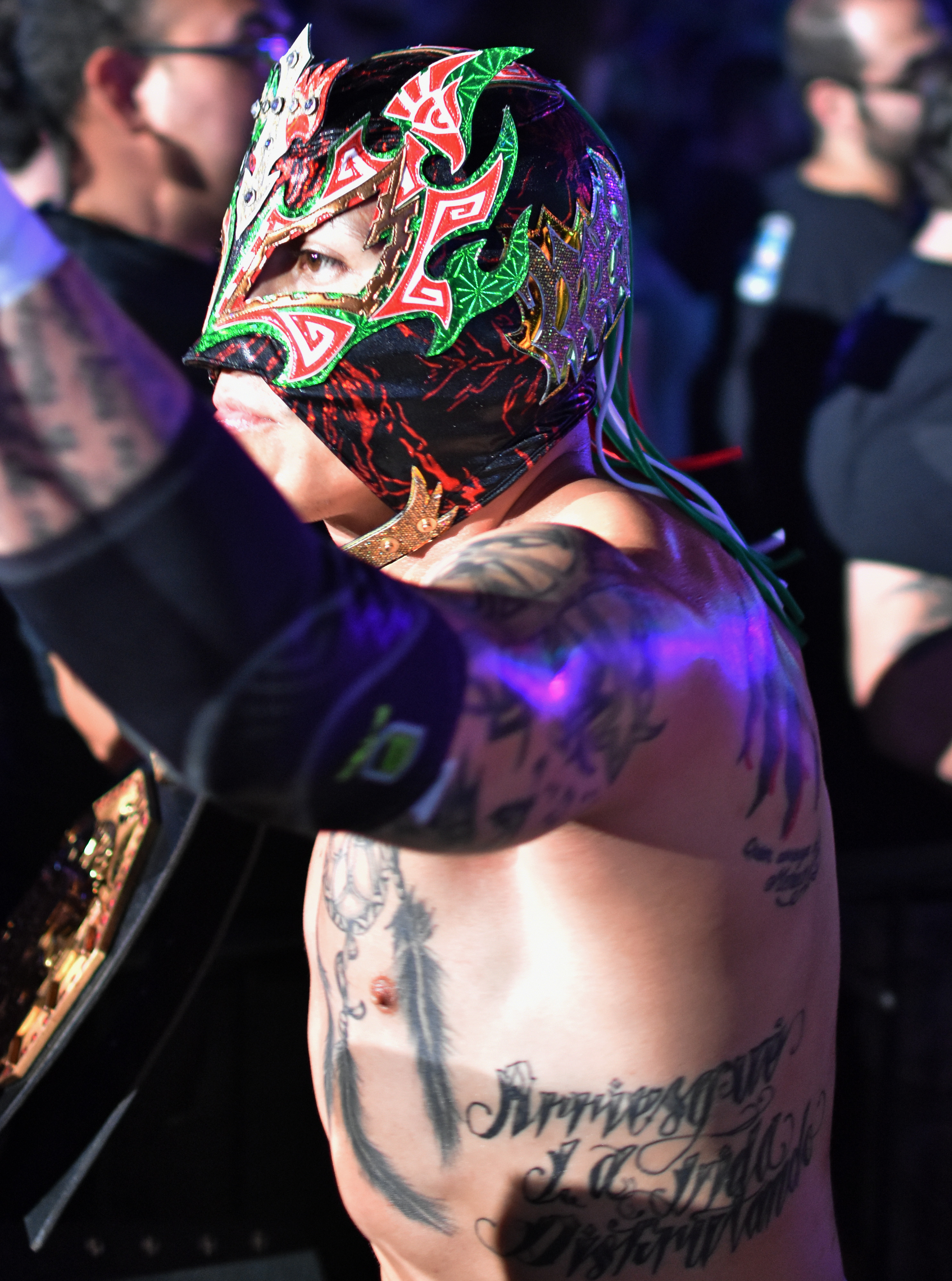
- Fénix in 2018

Personal information
- Born: December 30, 1990 (age 35) Mexico City, Mexico
- Family: Penta (brother)

Professional wrestling career
- Ring name(s): Fénix; Fénix el Rey; King; The King; King Phoenix; Máscara Oriental; Rey Fénix
- Billed height: 1.77 m (5 ft 9 1/2 in)
- Billed weight: 82.6 kg (182 lb)
- Billed from: Ecatepec, Mexico
- Trained by: El Apache; Cuchillo; Pequeño Black Shadow; Skayde; Tony Salazar
- Debut: April 19, 2005

Rey Fénix (born December 30, 1990) is a Mexican professional wrestler. He is signed to WWE, where he performs on the SmackDown brand. He also makes appearances in Mexican promotion Lucha Libre AAA Worldwide (AAA), where he is the current AAA World Cruiserweight Champion in his second reign. He is known for his tenures in Consejo Mundial De Lucha Libre (CMLL), All Elite Wrestling (AEW), Ring of Honor (ROH), and Major League Wrestling (MLW). He is also known for being one-half of the Lucha Brothers tag team with his elder brother, Penta.

He is also known for his tenure in Impact Wrestling, where the Lucha Bros are former Impact World Tag Team Champions. He has also worked for various American and Mexican independent promotions, most notably Pro Wrestling Guerrilla (PWG) in the U.S., where he is a one-time PWG World Tag Team Champion with his brother, and The Crash Lucha Libre in Mexico.

After originally starting his career on the Mexican independent circuit in 2005, Fénix signed with AAA in January 2011, where he became the inaugural AAA Fusión Champion in March 2013. Through AAA, Fénix where he became the AAA Mega Champion, Latin American and World Cruiserweight Champion, and also began working for Lucha Underground in late 2014, becoming the inaugural Gift of the Gods Champion in April 2015 and winning the promotion's top title, the Lucha Underground Championship, the following November. Fénix has also held the Lucha Underground Trios Championship, making him the first wrestler in Lucha Underground to have won all three championships. He has also wrestled in Japan for Pro Wrestling Noah and Pro Wrestling Wave. After leaving AAA in September 2016, Fénix changed his ring name first to Fénix el Rey ("Phoenix the King") and then to Rey Fénix ("King Phoenix"). In AEW, he was a member of Death Triangle, and is a one-time AEW International Champion, one-time AEW World Tag Team Champion, and one-time AEW World Trios Champion.

== Professional wrestling career ==
Fénix started his professional wrestling career in 2005, working as Máscara Oriental ("Oriental Mask") on the Mexican independent circuit in places like Puebla, Pachuca and Querétaro. He was eventually also invited by Blue Demon Jr. to work for his NWA Mexico and by Crazy Boy to work for his Desastre Total Ultraviolento (DTU) promotion, before getting the opportunity to work for Lucha Libre AAA Worldwide (AAA), one of the top two promotions in the country.

=== Lucha Libre AAA Worldwide (2011–2016) ===
Prior to his AAA debut, Máscara Oriental was renamed Fénix, after the mythological bird, and given a new mask. He wrestled his debut match on January 27, 2011, when he, Atomic Boy and Gato Eveready defeated his real-life brother Dark Dragon, Tigre Cota and Tito Santana in a six-man tag team match. Fénix was instantly booked in a storyline rivalry with his brother. On June 18 at Triplemanía XIX, Fénix teamed with Aero Star, Argos and Sugi San in an eight-person tag team dark match, where they were defeated by La Milicia Extrema (Dark Dragon, Decnnis, Tigre Cota and Tito Santana). Later in the year, Fénix formed a partnership with Jack Evans and, as a result, got involved in his rivalry with Los Perros del Mal leader El Hijo del Perro Aguayo. On December 16 at Guerra de Titanes, Fénix and Evans teamed with Drago, the former Gato Eveready, in a six-man tag team match, where they were defeated by Aguayo and his Perros del Mal stablemates Halloween and Héctor Garza.

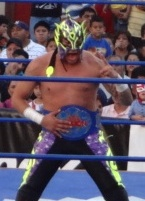
Fénix as the AAA Fusión Champion in March 2013

On October 7, 2012, at Héroes Inmortales, Fénix received his first title opportunity in AAA, when he and Lolita unsuccessfully challenged Alan Stone and Jennifer Blake for the AAA World Mixed Tag Team Championship in a four-way match, which also included the teams of Atomic Boy and Faby Apache and Halloween and Mari Apache, who went on to win the match. On November 3, Fénix entered a tournament to determine the inaugural AAA Fusión Champion, defeating Dark Dragon, Drago and Toscano in his first round four-way match. Before the finals of the tournament, Fénix also received a shot at the AAA Cruiserweight Championship in a six-way ladder match at Guerra de Titanes on December 2, but was defeated by Los Perros del Mal member Daga. On March 17, 2013, at Rey de Reyes, Fénix gained a measure of revenge on Daga, when he defeated not only him, but also Crazy Boy and Juventud Guerrera in a four-way elimination finals of the tournament to become the first-ever AAA Fusión Champion. On June 16 at Triplemanía XXI, Fénix teamed with Drago in a five-way tag team match for the vacant AAA World Tag Team Championship, from which the two were the last team eliminated by the Mexican Powers (Crazy Boy and Joe Líder). On August 18 at Héroes Inmortales VII, Fénix entered the 2013 Copa Antonio Peña, defeating El Mesías, Monster Clown and Silver King in his first round match. Later that same event, Fénix was defeated by La Parka in the finals, a four-way match, which also included Chessman and El Hijo del Fantasma. On March 16, 2014, at Rey de Reyes, Fénix won his first Lucha de Apuestas, when he won an eight-man Domo de la Muerte, saving his own mask and forcing Steve Pain to have his head shaved. On August 17 at Triplemanía XXII, Fénix put his AAA Fusión Championship on the line in a ten-way championship unification match contested also for the AAA Cruiserweight Championship. The match was eventually won by El Hijo del Fantasma. Fénix received another shot at the title on March 18, 2015, at Rey de Reyes, but was again defeated by El Hijo del Fantasma. On September 24, 2016, Fénix announced his departure from AAA.

=== Japan (2012, 2013, 2016) ===
On November 27, 2012, Fénix made his Japanese debut in Tokyo's Korakuen Hall, when he took part in an event held by women's wrestling promotion Pro Wrestling Wave, which featured participation from several AAA workers. Fénix teamed with Lolita and Pimpinela Escarlata in a six-person tag team match, where they were defeated by Ayako Hamada, Bachiko and Cima.

On September 2, 2013, Fénix announced that he would be returning to Japan on September 7 to work a tour with Pro Wrestling Noah, announcing his intention of going for the GHC Junior Heavyweight Championship. The following day, the title match between Fénix and the reigning champion, Taiji Ishimori, was made official for September 22. Fénix started his tour with a win over Peruvian wrestler Kaiser. On September 12, Fénix pinned Ishimori in a tag team match, where he and Yoshinari Ogawa defeated Ishimori and Atsushi Kotoge. En route to the title match, Fénix scored two more pinfall victories over Ishimori, but on September 22 was defeated by the champion in the match for the GHC Junior Heavyweight Championship. The match also marked the end of Fénix's first tour with Noah.

On April 20, 2016, Fénix returned to Japan to take part in the inaugural event of Akebono's Ōdō promotion. At the event, Fénix was defeated by Pentagón Jr.

=== Lucha Underground (2014–2018) ===
In August 2014, Fénix was announced as one of five AAA wrestlers to star in Lucha Underground, a new American television series on El Rey. Fénix debuted on the third episode on November 12, defeating Drago and Pentagón Jr. in a three-way main event by pinning Pentagón Jr., the former Dark Dragon. Over the next weeks, the two real-life brothers developed a storyline rivalry between them. On the January 14, 2015, episode, Fénix unsuccessfully challenged Prince Puma for the Lucha Underground Championship. Fénix then entered a new rivalry with Mil Muertes, becoming the first wrestler to defeat him in a singles match. As part of the storyline, Muertes' valet Catrina started coming on to Fénix, which eventually led to Muertes turning on her. Fénix, however, saved Catrina and took her as his own valet. The rivalry culminated on the March 18 episode, where Fénix defeated Muertes in a "Grave Consequences" casket match. On April 19 at Ultima Lucha, Lucha Underground's season one finale, Fénix defeated six other winners of Azteca Medallions to become the inaugural Gift of the Gods Champion, earning a future shot at the Lucha Underground Championship. On November 14 at the second-season premiere, Fénix lost the Gift of the Gods Championship to King Cuerno. On November 21, Fénix regained the title from King Cuerno in a ladder match. The following day, Fénix defeated Mil Muertes to win the Lucha Underground Championship. He lost the title to Matanza in a 20-man Aztec Warfare match on December 12. At Ultima Lucha Dos on January 31, 2016, Fénix won the Lucha Underground Trios Championship, when he teamed with Aero Star and Drago to defeat Jack Evans, Johnny Mundo and P. J. Black, becoming Lucha Underground's first Triple Crown Champion. They lost the title on May 7, when Drago turned on Fénix and Aero Star during a defense against Kobra Moon, Pindar and Vibora. At Ultima Lucha Tres, Fénix culminated a rivalry with Marty "the Moth" Martinez by defeating him in a Lucha de Apuestas Mask vs. Hair match.

The series was discontinued after season 4 finale, Ultima Lucha Cuatro.

=== American independent circuit (2015–2019) ===
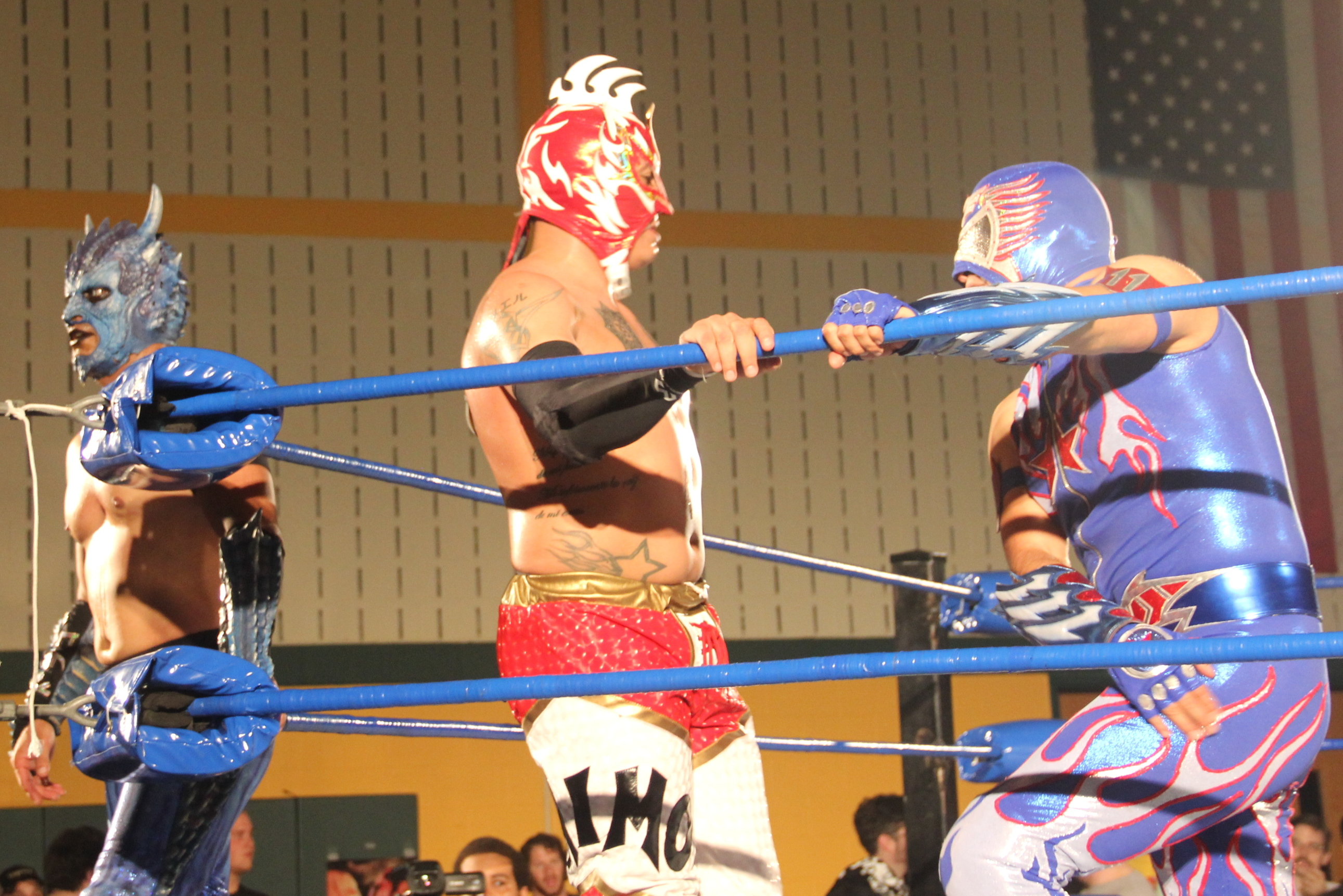
Fénix (center) with Drago (left) and Aero Star at Chikara's King of Trios event in 2015

On August 28, 2015, Fénix made his debut for Pro Wrestling Guerrilla (PWG) by entering the 2015 Battle of Los Angeles tournament, losing to Matt Sydal in his first round match. On September 4, Fénix made his debut for another American promotion, Chikara, when he, Aero Star and Drago entered the 2015 King of Trios tournament as "Team AAA". They defeated the Gentleman's Club (Chuck Taylor, Drew Gulak and The Swamp Monster) in their first round match. The following day, Team AAA defeated the Nightmare Warriors (Frightmare, Hallowicked and Silver Ant) to advance to the semifinals of the tournament. On September 6, Team AAA first defeated reigning King of Trios winners, the Devastation Corporation (Blaster McMassive, Flex Rumblecrunch and Max Smashmaster), in the semifinals and then Bullet Club (A.J. Styles and The Young Bucks) in the finals to win the 2015 King of Trios. On May 6, 2016, Fénix made his debut for AAW: Professional Wrestling Redefined, losing to Pentagón Jr. In July 2016, it was reported that Fénix had moved to San Diego in order to start working full-time in the United States. On September 2, Fénix returned to PWG, entering the 2016 Battle of Los Angeles, from which he was eliminated in the first round by Will Ospreay. Two days later, Fénix and Pentagón Jr. unsuccessfully challenged The Young Bucks for the PWG World Tag Team Championship. On October 12, Fénix defeated Jeff Cobb, Jonathan Gresham and Sonjay Dutt at Lucha Ilimitado's inaugural event to become the first-ever Corazón de Oro Champion. On March 18, 2017, Fénix and Penta el Zero M defeated The Young Bucks and the team of Matt Sydal and Ricochet in a three-way match to win the PWG World Tag Team Championship. On September 1, Fénix entered the 2017 Battle of Los Angeles, defeating Rey Horus in his first round match. Two days later, Fénix defeated Zack Sabre Jr. to advance to the semifinals of the tournament, where he was eliminated by Keith Lee. On October 20, Fénix and Penta lost the PWG World Tag Team Championship to Cobb and Matt Riddle.

=== Mexican independent circuit (2016–2019) ===
Following his departure from AAA, Fénix began working under the new ring name "Rey Fénix" (King Phoenix). Even though Fénix came up with the new name after his departure from the promotion, AAA trademarked the name Rey Fénix, which led to him changing his name to "Fénix el Rey" (Phoenix the King). He, however, continued using both Fénix and Rey Fénix while working in the United States. On January 27, Fénix formed a new stable named La Rebelión ("The Rebellion") with three other wrestlers who had recently quit AAA; Daga, Garza Jr. and his brother Pentagón Jr., now known as Penta 0M. The following month, with AAA also registering the Fénix el Rey name, Fénix announced that he would now be known as Rey Fenix (without the accent and stylized in all capital letters).

=== Impact Wrestling (2018–2019) ===
Rey Fénix debuted with Impact Wrestling in an Impact Wrestling vs Lucha Underground co-promotional event at WrestleCon in April 2018. Fénix and his brother Pentagón Jr. fought in a triple threat match with Impact Wrestling World Champion Austin Aries. Fénix and Pentagón Jr. were then announced to face each other in a match at Redemption. The match was subsequently changed to a triple threat match with Austin Aries defending the Impact World Championship instead. The match saw Pentagón Jr. take the victory and the championship. On the August 30 episode of Impact, Fénix unsuccessfully challenged Brian Cage for the Impact X Division Championship. On January 12, 2019, Pentagón and Fénix defeated LAX during the TV tapings in Mexico to win the Impact World Tag Team Championship. At Rebellion, they lost the titles back to LAX in a Full Metal Mayhem match.

=== Major League Wrestling (2018–2019) ===
Rey Fénix made his debut for the U.S. based Major League Wrestling (MLW) on January 11, 2018, where he lost to his brother Pentagón as part of MLW's "Zero Hour" show. The following month, Los Lucha Bros defeated "Team TBD" (Jason Cade and Jimmy Yuta) and The Dirty Blondes (Leo Brien and Mike Patrick) to become the first holders of the MLW World Tag Team Championship in the restarted MLW. At MLW Fightland, held on November 8, 2018, Los Lucha Bros successfully defended the MLW World Tag Team Championship against the father/son team of L.A. Park and El Hijo de L.A. Park. The team would hold the titles until SuperFight on February 2, 2019, when they lost the MLW Tag Team Championship to The Hart Foundation (Teddy Hart and Davey Boy Smith Jr.). Fenix and Penta appeared at MLW's next event, Intimidation Games, which took place on March 2, 2019.

=== Return to AAA (2018–2023) ===
After the main event of AAA's Verano de Escándalo show Fénix made his AAA return, attacking the rudos, including newly crowned AAA Mega Champion Jeff Jarrett. After the show Fénix stated that he was not signed with AAA full time, but worked as an independent wrestler and could work where he wanted to. While working for AAA he would be billed as "Fénix". On August 2, Fénix defeated Flamita and Bandido to be the number one contender and face Jarrett for the title in Triplemanía XXVI. At the event, Fénix pinned Jeff Jarrett to become the AAA Mega Champion for the first time in his career. Fénix was originally announced as defending the AAA Mega Championship at Guerra de Titanes against Brian Cage, but due to an injury suffered in the weeks before the show, Fénix was unable to defend the championship. Because of the injury he also was unable to compete in the Lucha Capital tournament as originally planned. Laredo Kid won the tournament and was positioned as the next challenger for the Mega Championship.

On August 10, 2019, after almost a year without defending the AAA Mega Championship, Fénix defeated Laredo Kid, Puma King and Taurus in Saltillo to retain the championship. Fenix's reign would come to an end on October 19, 2019, losing to Kenny Omega at Héroes Inmortales XIII.

On June 18, 2022, at Triplemanía XXX: Tijuana, Fénix won AAA World Cruiserweight and Latin American Championships in a five-way match. Fénix left AAA due to his commitments with other promotions, relinquishing both championships in the process.

=== Consejo Mundial de Lucha Libre (2018–2019, 2024) ===
On June 8, 2018, Rey Fénix made his Consejo Mundial de Lucha Libre (CMLL) debut, working for AAA's biggest rival only 5 days after returning to AAA. For his debut, Rey Fénix teamed up with two of CMLL's top tecnicos, Carístico and Místico to defeat La Peste Negra ("The Black Plague"; Bárbaro Cavernario and Negro Casas) and Último Guerrero. The following week he was billed as "King Phoenix" for his CMLL appearance. After the show he explained that he used that name until he had full legal rights to the name "Rey Fénix". King Phoenix continued to work for CMLL, even after he won the AAA Mega Championship. King Phoenix and Bárbaro Cavernario outlasted 16 other wrestlers in the first stage of the 2018 Leyenda de Plata tournament, with Bárbaro Cavernario defeating King Phoenix the following week to win the tournament. After the match it was revealed that King Phoenix suffered a hip or pelvic injury as a result of a mistimed dive out of the ring, and would be unable to compete for a least five weeks. He returned to CMLL on January 1, 2019, in the semi-main event of Sin Piedad, after recovering from his injury.

It was announced in July 2024 that Fénix and Death Triangle stable-mates Pac and Pentagón Jr. would be making their debut as a stable for CMLL on the July 27 Super Viernes show. At the show, Pentagón was announced under the ring name Lucha Brother, while Fénix was announced as King. Death Triangle were defeated by Mistico, Mascara Dorada and Volador Jr. by disqualification in a six-man tag team match.

=== All Elite Wrestling / Ring of Honor (2019–2025) ===
During an independent circuit show in Georgia, The Young Bucks came to the ring to offer the Lucha Brothers an All Elite Wrestling (AEW) contract in a confrontation that ended with a verbal agreement and a handshake. It was subsequently revealed that Fénix and Pentagón Jr. had agreed to a non-exclusive deal with AEW, due to their legal obligations to Lucha Underground. On February 7, 2019, at the All Elite Wrestling Ticket Announcement held at the MGM Grand Pool Splash, in Las Vegas, Nevada, the Fénix and Pentagón Jr. making their first appearance with the promotion. The Young Bucks were leaving the stage as The Lucha Brothers' music played, and the two teams faced off before a brawl ensued. Pentagón struck Matt Jackson first, while Fénix took out Nick Jackson with a super kick. Pentagón then proceeded to package piledrive Matt Jackson on the stage, before cutting promos and advertising themselves for Double Or Nothing, and exiting the stage. At the event, Fénix and Pentagón lost to the Young Bucks. They won back the titles in a rematch organized by AAA at Verano de Escándalo. This led to a 6-man tag match at Fyter Fest, where the Lucha Brothers teamed with Laredo Kid in another losing effort against the Young Bucks and Kenny Omega.

On the March 4, 2020 episode of Dynamite, the Lucha Brothers formed a trio along with Pac known as Death Triangle. They made their debut as a team against Joey Janela and the Private Party, defeating them. However, with Pac stuck in the U.K., due to travel restrictions, they then formed an alliance with Eddie Kingston as well as The Butcher and The Blade. On the November 18 episode of Dynamite, Fenix and Penta turned face again and revived their Death Triangle alliance with Pac after saving him during a beatdown from Kingston, Butcher and Blade. On the January 6, 2021 episode of Dynamite, Fénix failed to win the AEW World Championship against Omega. At All Out, the Lucha Brothers defeated the Young Bucks in a tornado tag steel cage match to win the AEW World Tag Team Championship. On the October 16 episode of Dynamite, The Lucha Brothers lost their AAA World Tag Team Championship to FTR (Dax Harwood and Cash Wheeler), who were disguised as a luchador team called Las Super Ranas. On the January 5, 2022 episode of Dynamite, Fenix was chokeslammed off the apron through a table by Luchasaurus which dislocated his left elbow upon landing. This match was also for the AEW World Tag Team Championship, which Jungle Boy and Luchasaurus would proceed to win shortly after Fenix's injury. Rey Fenix would return to TV on the April 27 episode of Dynamite, disguised as manager Alex Abrahantes, before attacking the House of Black along with the rest of Death Triangle. On September 8 edition of Rampage Death Triangle won the vacant AEW Trios Championship defeating Best Friends.

The trio made their first defense as trios champions defeating The Dark Order on the October 7th edition of Rampage. Soon after, they would begin a feud with The Elite and would enagage in a best of seven series with them over the following months. The best of seven series culminated on the January 11, 2023 edition of Dynamite where The Elite defeated Death Triangle in a ladder match to become the new trios champions, ending their reign at 126 days. In 2023, the Lucha Brothers would begin appearing for AEW's sister promotion, Ring of Honor (ROH). At Supercard of Honor on March 31, 2023, the Lucha Brothers won a "Reach for the Sky" ladder match to win the vacant ROH World Tag Team Championship. At Double or Nothing on May 28, both Pentagon and Fenix competed in the Blackjack Battle Royale for the AEW International Championship but both were unsuccessful. On July 21 at Death Before Dishonor, the Lucha Brothers lost the ROH titles to Aussie Open in a four-way tag team match.

At Dynamite: Grand Slam on September 20, 2023, Fénix won his first singles title in AEW by defeating Jon Moxley to win the AEW International Championship. On October 10, 2023, at Title Tuesday, he lost the title back to Orange Cassidy. It was then reported that Fénix would be taking time off due to an injury. On the April 27, 2024 episode of AEW Collision, Fénix returned, defeating The Beast Mortos. At Double or Nothing on May 26, Death Triangle challenged the Bang Bang Gang for the AEW World Trios Championship but were unsuccessful. On the July 19 (taped July 17) episode of Rampage The Lucha Brothers defeated Private Party in what would end up being Pentagon's final appearance in AEW. Fenix, by himself, would make one additional appearance defeating Tony Nese on the July 20th episode of Collision in what would be his final appearance in the AEW. He was taken off television shortly afterwards. On November 30, Pentagon's contract expired, with Fénix being released four months later. However, on March 3, 2025, Fénix's profile was removed from AEW's website, ending his six-year tenure with the company.

=== WWE (2025–present) ===
On March 21, 2025, it was reported by Fightful Select Español that Fénix was officially signed to WWE. In the same month, WWE began airing vignettes on SmackDown to promote his debut. He made his debut on the April 4 episode of SmackDown under his "Rey Fénix" name, defeating Nathan Frazer. On April 19, Fénix replaced an injured Rey Mysterio to face El Grande Americano at WrestleMania 41 Saturday, where he was defeated. At the WWE and AAA event Worlds Collide on June 7, Fenix competed in his first title match in WWE, where he unsuccessfully challenged for the NXT North American Championship against defending champion Ethan Page, Je'Von Evans and Laredo Kid in a fatal four-way match. In the same month, Fenix formed a tag team with Andrade, competing at night 2 of SummerSlam on August 3, in a Six-Pack tag team Tables, Ladders, and Chairs match for the WWE Tag Team Championship, but failed to win. The team would quickly disband as Andrade would leave WWE a month later. On the September 12 episode of SmackDown, Fénix accepted Sami Zayn's open challenge for the WWE United States Championship, but failed to win the title. At the Royal Rumble on January 31, 2026, Fenix entered the match at #24 being eliminated by Brock Lesnar.

=== Return to AAA (2025–present) ===
At Guerra de Titanes, Fénix and Rey Mysterio (with Penta) defeated Los Gringos Locos 2.0 (Dominik Mysterio and El Grande Americano) in the main event at the Arena Guadalajara. At Rey de Reyes, Fénix, Lola Vice and Mr. Iguana defeated La Hiedra and Money Machine (Garra de Oro and Colmillo de Plata) in a Relevos Australianos match. At Noche de Los Grandes, Fénix defeated Laredo Kid to win the AAA World Cruiserweight Championship for the second time.

== Personal life ==
Rey Fénix has two brothers who are also professional wrestlers, including his elder brother Pentagón Jr. He resides in San Diego, California.

His real name is not a matter of public record, as is often the case with masked wrestlers in Mexico, where their private lives are kept a secret from the wrestling fans.

== Championships and accomplishments ==
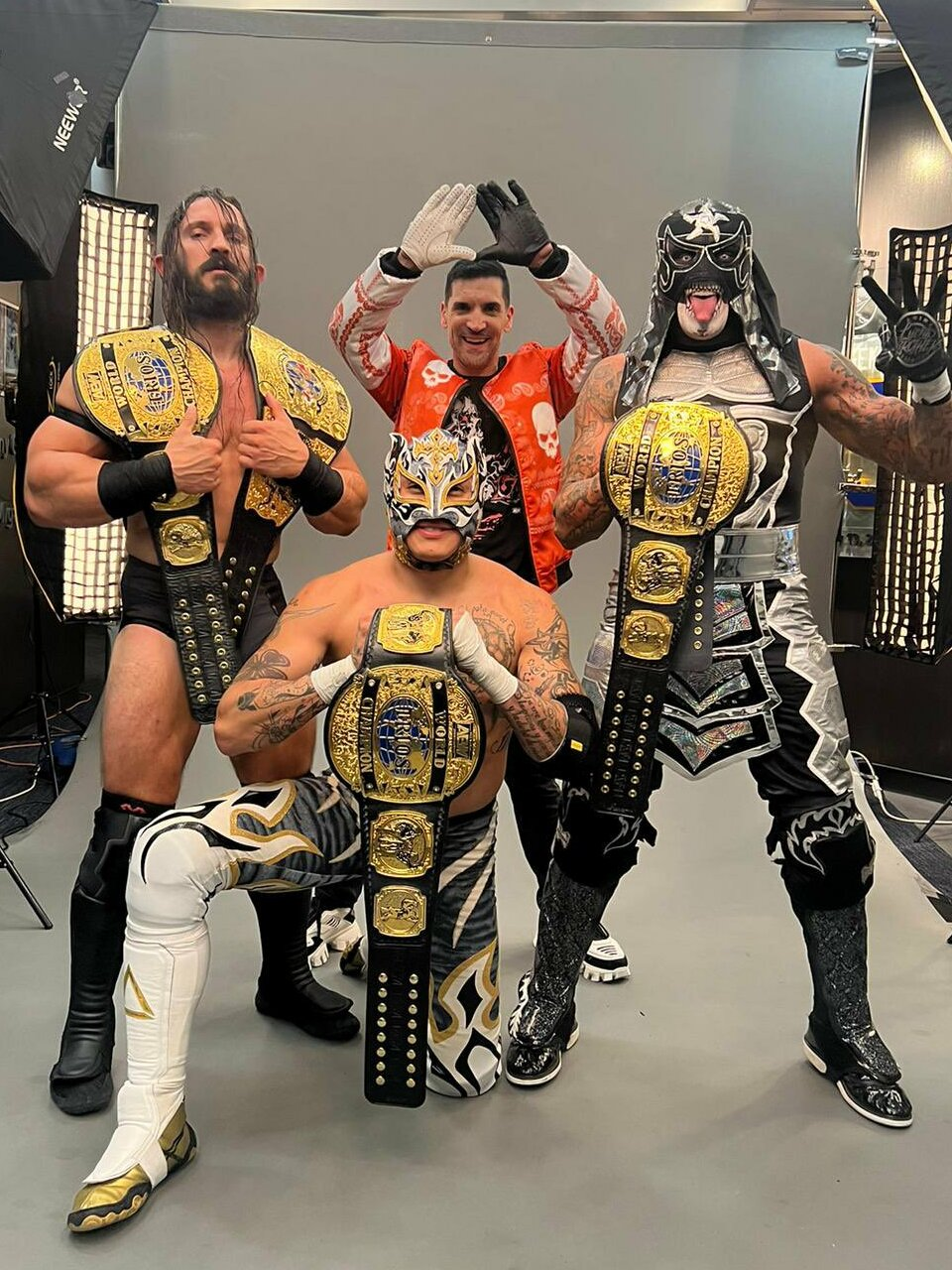
Fénix as part of Death Triangle, the holders of the AEW World Trios Championship in 2023

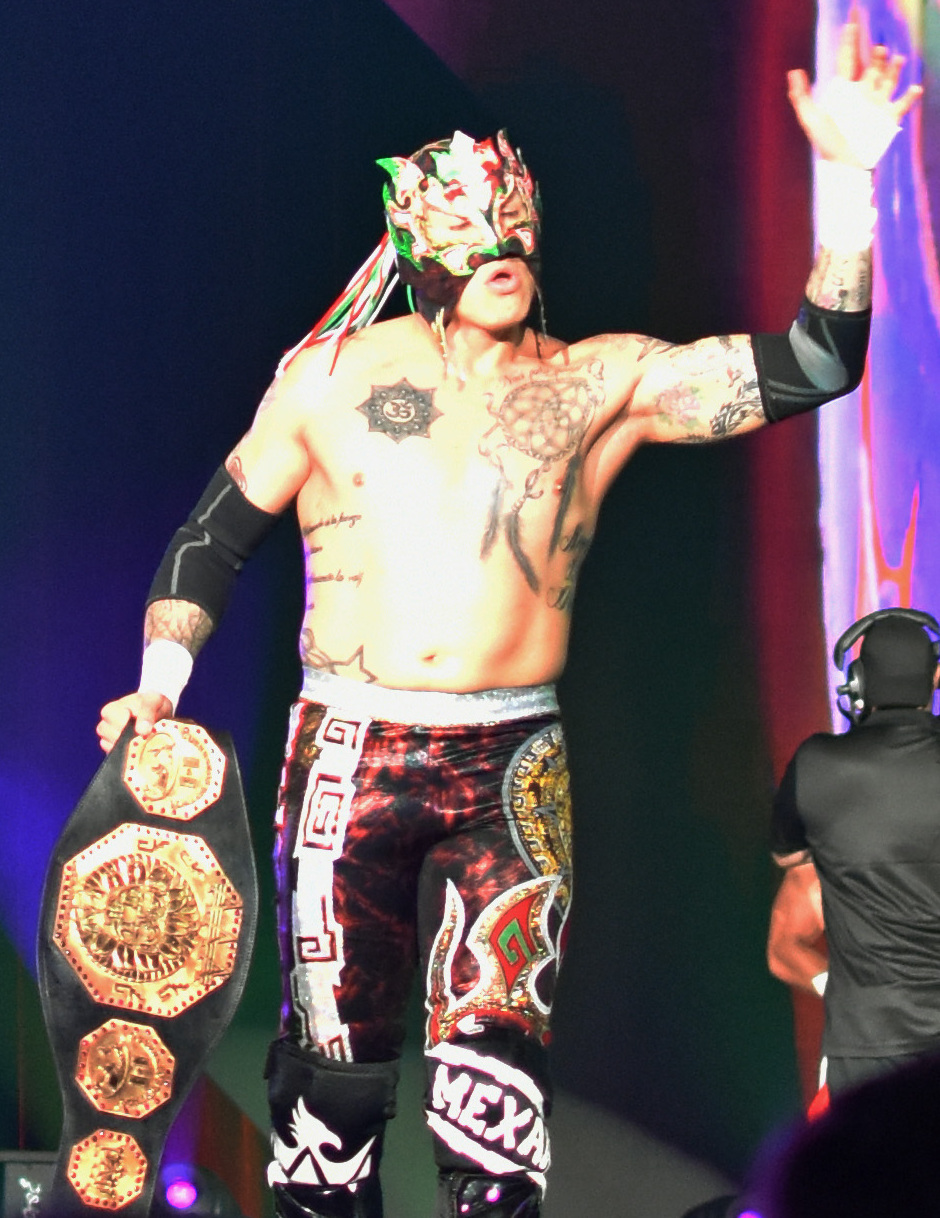
Fénix as the AAA Mega Champion in September 2018.

- All Elite Wrestling
  - AEW International Championship (1 time)
  - AEW World Tag Team Championship (1 time) – with Penta El Zero Miedo
  - AEW World Trios Championship (1 time) – with Pac and Penta El Zero Miedo
  - AEW World Tag Team Championship Eliminator Tournament (2021) – with Penta El Zero Miedo
  - Men's Casino Tag Team Royale (2021) – with Pac
- AAW: Professional Wrestling Redefined
  - AAW Heavyweight Championship (1 time)
  - AAW Tag Team Championship (2 times) – with A. R. Fox (1) and Penta el 0M (1)
- CBS Sports
  - Tag Team of the Year (2019) – with Pentagón Jr.
- Chikara
  - King of Trios (2015) – with Aero Star and Drago
- The Crash Lucha Libre
  - The Crash Cruiserweight Championship (2 times)
  - The Crash Tag Team Championship (1 time) – with Penta 0M
  - Trofeo X Gym (2015)
- Fight Club: PRO
  - Dream Team Invitational (2019) – with Penta el Zero M
- Gladiadores Azteca de Lucha Libre Internacional
  - GALLI Championship (1 time)
- House of Glory
  - HOG Tag Team Championship (1 time) – with Pentagón Jr.
- Impact Wrestling
  - Impact World Tag Team Championship (1 time) – with Pentagón Jr.
- Lucha Ilimitado
  - Corazón de Oro Championship (1 time)
- Lucha Libre AAA Worldwide
  - AAA Mega Championship (1 time)
  - AAA Latin American Championship (1 time)
  - AAA World Cruiserweight Championship (2 times, current)
  - AAA Fusión Championship (1 time, inaugural)
  - AAA World Tag Team Championship (2 times) – with Pentagón Jr.
  - AAA Fusión Championship Tournament (2013)
  - First Triple Crown Champion
- Lucha Maniaks
  - Lucha Maniaks Tag Team Championship (1 time) – with Penta El Zero Miedo
- Lucha Underground
  - Lucha Underground Championship (1 time)
  - Gift of the Gods Championship (2 times)
  - Lucha Underground Trios Championship (1 time) – with Aero Star and Drago
  - First Triple Crown Champion
- Mucha Lucha Atlanta
  - Border War Tournament (2017)
- Major League Wrestling
  - MLW World Tag Team Championship (1 time) – with Penta el Zero M
- New Generation Championship Wrestling
  - NGCW Florida Grand Championship (1 time)
- Oddity Wrestling Alliance
  - Border x Brewing Championship (1 time, inaugural)
  - Border x Brewing Championship Tournament (2017)
- Perros del Mal Producciones
  - Perros del Mal Light Heavyweight Championship (2 times)
- Pro Wrestling Guerrilla
  - PWG World Tag Team Championship (1 time) – with Penta el Zero M
- Pro Wrestling Illustrated
  - Ranked No. 22 of the top 500 singles wrestlers in the PWI 500 in 2019
- Ring of Honor
  - ROH World Tag Team Championship (1 time) – with Penta El Zero Miedo
- Rockstar Pro Wrestling
  - American Luchacore Championship (1 time, final)
- The Wrestling Revolver
  - The F'n Catalina Wrestling Mixer Tournament (2017)
- Wrestling Alliance Revolution
  - WAR World Tag Team Championship (1 time, final) – with Penta el 0M
- Xtrem Mexican Wrestling
  - XMW Tag Team Championship (1 time) – with Dark Dragon
- Other titles
  - Mexico State Lightweight Championship (1 time)
- Wrestling Observer Newsletter
  - Tag Team of The Year (2019) – with Pentagón Jr.
  - Mexico MVP (2019, 2020)
  - Best Flying Wrestler (2020, 2021)
  - Pro Wrestling Match of the Year (2021) – with Pentagón Jr vs. the Young Bucks at All Out

== Luchas de Apuestas record ==
Winner (wager)	Loser (wager)	Location	Event	Date	Notes
Máscara Oriental (mask)	Mr. Kid (hair)	N/A	Live event	N/A	
Fénix (mask)	Steve Pain (hair)	Monterrey, Nuevo León	Rey de Reyes	March 16, 2014	(Note: This was an eight-way Domo de la Muerte Masks vs. Hairs match, which also included Crazy Boy, Eterno, Joe Líder, Niño Hamburguesa, Pentagón Jr. and Último Gladiador.)
Fénix (mask)	Marty Martinez (hair)	Boyle Heights, California	Ultima Lucha Tres	June 25, 2016	
Fénix (mask)	Sami Callihan (AAW Heavyweight Championship)	Berwyn, Illinois	AAW Defining Moment	August 31, 2017	
