= Triplemanía XXI =

2013 Lucha Libre AAA World Wide event

- Official Logo
- Promotion: AAA
- Date: June 16, 2013
- City: Mexico City
- Venue: Arena Ciudad de México

Pay-per-view chronology
← Previous; Rey de Reyes	Next → Héroes Inmortales VII

Triplemanía chronology
← Previous; XX	Next → XXII

Triplemanía XXI was a professional wrestling pay-per-view (PPV) produced by the AAA promotion, which took place on June 16, 2013, at Arena Ciudad de México in Mexico City, Mexico. The event was the 21st year that AAA held a Triplemanía and it was the 28th show held under the Triplemanía as AAA held multiple Triplemanía shows some years. The annual Triplemanía show is AAA's biggest show of the year, serving as the culmination of major storylines and feature wrestlers from all over the world competing in what has been described as AAA's version of WrestleMania or their Super Bowl event.

The show consisted of eight matches including a Lucha de Apuestas, or "Bet match" between Cibernético and El Hijo del Perro Aguayo where both men wagered their hair on the outcome of the match, a five-way match for the vacant AAA World Tag Team Championship, a match between Blue Demon, Jr. and El Mesías for the vacant AAA Latin American Championship, an eight-person Atomicos match, and a singles match between Chessman and Heavy Metal, with the winner earning a shot at El Texano, Jr.'s AAA Mega Championship later in the event. In addition to airing on regular pay-per-view, the event was also scheduled to become AAA's first ever internet pay-per-view (iPPV). However, due to technical difficulties Ustream was unable to air the event, leading to the company offering refunds to all those who had purchased it through its site. On June 18, 2013, AAA posted the entire event for free on YouTube.

== Production ==
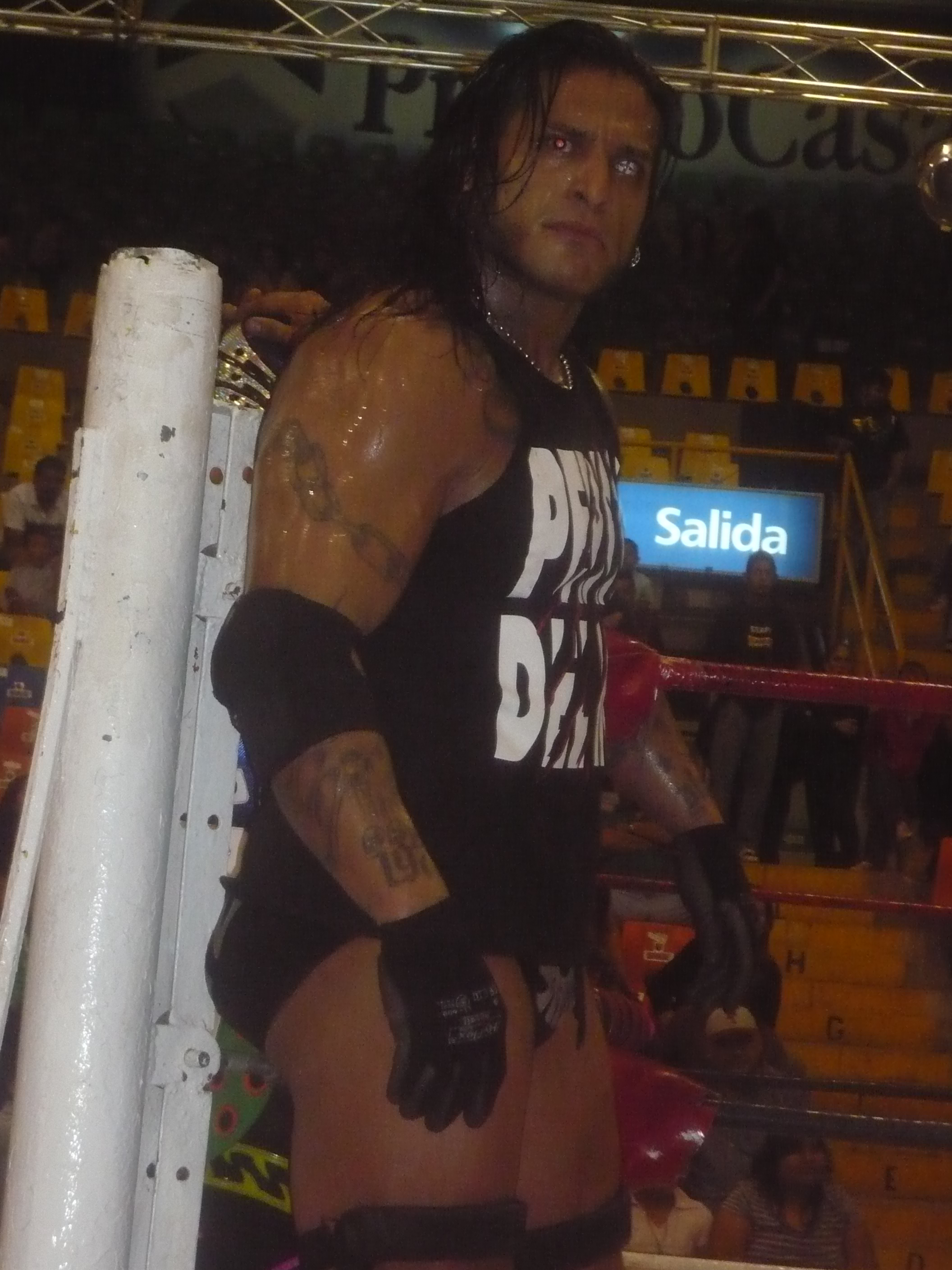
Cibernético worked the main event of the show. Wearing the shirt of his opponent's faction Los Perros del Mal

=== Background ===
In early 1992 Antonio Peña was working as a booker and storyline writer for Consejo Mundial de Lucha Libre (CMLL), Mexico's largest and the world's oldest wrestling promotion, and was frustrated by CMLL's very conservative approach to professional wrestling, specifically the style of wrestling known as Lucha Libre (Spanish for "freestyle wrestling"). He joined forced with a number of younger, very talented wrestlers who felt like CMLL was not giving them the recognition they deserved and decided to split from CMLL to create Asistencia Asesoría y Administración, later known simply as "AAA" and then Lucha Libre AAA World Wide. After making a deal with the Televisa television network AAA held their first show in April 1992. The following year Peña and AAA held their first Triplemanía event, building it into an annual event that would become AAA's Super Bowl event, similar to the WWE's WrestleMania being the biggest show of the year. The 2013 Triplemanía was the 21st year in a row AAA held a Triplemanía show and the 26th overall show under the Triplemanía banner. AAA booked the Arena Ciudad de México venue for the event, an arena with of 22,300 seats. AAA also announced that Triplemanía XXI would be the first AAA show to be available via internet-pay-per-view (iPPV) as well as Mexican PPV. The streaming internet PPV was supposed to be available to the fans outside of Mexico as well as in Mexico, with AAA working with Ustream as their broadcasting partner for the show.

=== Storylines ===
The Triplemanía XXI show featured eight professional wrestling matches with different wrestlers involved in pre-existing scripted feuds, plots and storylines. Wrestlers were portrayed as either heels (referred to as rudos in Mexico, those that portray the "bad guys") or faces (técnicos in Mexico, the "good guy" characters) as they followed a series of tension-building events, which culminated in a wrestling match or series of matches.

On October 7, 2012 the makeshift team of Vampiro and Joe Líder defeated La Legión Extranjera (Abyss and Chessman) in a Tables, Ladders, and Chairs match to win the AAA World Tag Team Championship as part of AAA's 2012 Héroes Inmortales ("Immortal Heroes") show. The duo never actually defended the championship after Héroes Inmortales nor did they even team together. On May 22, 2015 AAA announced that the championship had been vacated due to the fact that the champions never defended the championship. They later announced that they would hold a five team elimination match to determine the new champions. AAA announced that the AAA teams of Angélico and Jack Evans, Drago and Fénix, Los Mexican Power (Crazy Boy and Joe Líder) and Los Perros del Mal (Daga and Psicosis) would all be in the match as well as Los Mamitos (Mr. E and Sexy B) representing the Puerto Rican World Wrestling League (WWL) promotion as AAA and WWL had a working agreement at the time.

== Event ==
The Five-way elimination tag team match for the vacant AAA World Tag Team Championship was contested under special rules that allowed both members of a team in the ring at the same time and teams alternating in and out of the ring without a traditional tag between competitors. Early in the match the team of Jack Evans and Angélico managed to pile up Drago, Fénix, Daga, Psicosis, Crazy Boy, Joe Líder and Sexy B in the middle of the, followed by Jack Evans performing a standing shooting star press onto the pile, followed by Angélico leaping off the top rope, performing a double stomp on the back of the man on top of the pile. Moments later Mr. E, the only man not in the pile, surprised Jack Evans to pin him and eliminate the team of Evans and Angélico. Los Mamitos were eliminated next after a double stomp off the top rope from Drago and Fénix. Crazy Boy pinned Psicosis to eliminate Los Perros del Mal leaving only two teams. In the end the Mexican Powers won the match and the vacant championship when Líder pinned Drago.

Mexican mixed martial arts fighter Érik "Goyito" Pérez, who at that time competed for the UFC, was originally scheduled to accompany Octagón for the seventh match against the Lucha Libre Leyendas team, but was forced to withdraw from the show due to an injury. The Leyendas team was accompanied by Dorian Roldan, who interfered in the match and was hit by Electroshock near the end of the match to the delight of the crowd.

=== Memorial ===
During the Triplemanía XXI AAA played videos to pay homage to Abismo Negro who was that year's hall of fame inductee. Abismo, real name Andrés Alejandro Palomeque González, died in 2009 from drowning. The show also paid tribute to wrestler Héctor Garza, real name Héctor Solano Segura, who had died from cancer in late May, 2013. Prior to his match against Cibernético, El Hijo del Perro Aguayo dedicated his match to Garza who was a lifelong friend.

=== iPPV Problems ===
While Triplemanía XXI was supposed to be the first iPPV held by AAA in collaboration with Ustream, but the show never aired live on the Internet. Initially the Ustream site was simply listed the channel the PPV was supposed to be on as "offline", later on while it was "live" did not actually show anything. AAA mentioned issues with the Ustream site twice during the show and held a quick press conference after the show. During the show AAA posted a message stating it was an ustream problem, not an AAA one. Ustream later refused that it was a problem on Ustream's part. AAA later offered a full refund to anyone that bought the PPV and made the entire Triplemanía XXI show available in HD on their official YouTube channel. Adam Martin of WrestleView commented that he would not buy the next PPV that AAA offered as an iPPV.

== Aftermath ==
While Rey Mendoza Jr. made a challenge to El Texano Jr. for the AAA Mega Championship he never actually wrestled a single match for AAA, much less a championship match against Texano Jr. Instead Texano Jr. moved on to a storyline with Los Psycho Circus. Over the fall on 2013 the storyline began to focus on a feud between Texano Jr. and Psycho Clown, leading to a successful Mega Championship defense at Héroes Inmortales VII on October 18, 2013. Texano Jr. won due to help from Los Perros del Mal, leading to a match for the AAA World Trios Championship and the 2013 Guerra de Titanes show where Los Psycho Circus defeated Texano Jr., Hijo del Fantasma and Silver King. At the subsequent Rey de Reyes show Psycho Clown, Cibernético and Electroshock defeated a La Sociedad team of Texano Jr., Jeff Jarrett and Máscara Año 2000 Jr. The victory led to Psycho Clown getting another match for the AAA Mega Championship at the Verano de Escándalo show a few months later. That match saw Texano Jr. once again defend the championship. To end the long running feud between the two they met at Triplemanía XXII with Psycho Clown risking his mask and Texano Jr. risking his hair in a Lucha de Apuestas or bet match. In the end Psycho Clown pinned Texano Jr. and forced him to be shaved bald as a result.

Los Mexican Powers would end up holding the AAA World Tag Team Championship for 124 days and had a successful title defense against Daga and Psicosis in August 2013. On October 18, 2013 the Héroes Inmortales VII show the Mexican Powers put their championship on the line against Aero Star and Drago, La Secta (Dark Escoria and Dark Espíritu) and Los Güeros del Cielo ("The Sky Blondes" the collective name of Angélico and Jack Evans). The match ended with Los Güeros winning the match and the championship from the Mexican Powers. In 2014 Joe Líder turned on Crazy Boy and joined Los Perros del Mal.

== Results ==
No.	Results	Stipulations	Times
1	Dinastía, El Elegido, Faby Apache and Pimpinela Escarlata defeated Mamba, Mini Abismo Negro, Silver Cain and Taya	Relevos Atómicos de Locura match	12:45
2	Heavy Metal defeated Chessman	Singles match, #1 contender for the AAA Mega Championship	08:33
3	Los Mexican Power (Crazy Boy and Joe Líder) (with Niño Hamburguesa) defeated Angélico and Jack Evans, Drago and Fénix, Los Mamitos (Mr. E and Sexy B) and Los Perros del Mal (Daga and Psicosis)	Five-way elimination tag team match for the vacant AAA World Tag Team Championship	20:12
4	Jeff Jarrett (with Karen Jarrett), Matt Morgan and Monster Pain (with Mistress Glenda Lee and Richard Negrin) defeated Los Psycho Circus (Monster Clown, Murder Clown and Psycho Clown)	Six-man tag team match	11:46
5	El Texano Jr. (c) (with Silver Kain) defeated Heavy Metal (with Tropi Casas)	Singles match for the AAA Mega Championship	11:42
6	Blue Demon Jr. (with Axel) defeated El Mesías (with Hugo Savinovich)	Singles match for the vacant AAA Latin American Championship	19:06
7	Dr. Wagner Jr. (with El Hijo de Dr. Wagner), Electroshock, La Parka and Octagón defeated Canek, Máscara Año 2000, Universo 2000 and Villano IV	Eight-man tag team match	23:07
8	El Hijo del Perro Aguayo (with Daga and Psicosis) defeated Cibernético (with Dark Cuervo)	Two-out-of-Three Falls Lucha de Apuestas Hair vs. Hair match	17:19
(c) / – the champion(s) heading into the match

Tag team championship order of elimination

#	Eliminated	Eliminated by	Time	Ref
1	Jack Evans and Angélico	Los Mamitos (Mr. E and Sexy B)	06:06	
2	Los Mamitos (Mr. E and Sexy B)	Drago and Fénix	09:19	
3	Los Perros del Mal (Daga and Psicosis)	The Mexican Powers (Crazy Boy and Joe Líder)	14:10	
4	Drago and Fénix	The Mexican Powers (Crazy Boy and Joe Líder)	24:40	
W	Winners	The Mexican Powers (Crazy Boy and Joe Líder)	24:40	
