= Rey de Reyes (2014) =

2014 Lucha Libre AAA World Wide event

- Promotional poster featuring various AAA wrestlers
- Promotion: Lucha Libre AAA World Wide
- Date: March 16, 2014
- City: Monterrey, Nuevo León
- Venue: Plaza de Toros Monumental Lorenzo Garza
- Attendance: 10,000

Event chronology
← Previous; Guerra de Titanes	Next → Verano de Escándalo

Rey de Reyes chronology
← Previous; 2013	Next → 2015

Rey de Reyes (Spanish for "King of Kings") was a professional wrestling event produced by the Lucha Libre AAA World Wide (AAA) promotion, which took take place on March 16, 2014, at Plaza de Toros Monumental Lorenzo Garza in Monterrey, Nuevo León, Mexico. The event was the 18th event produced under the Rey de Reyes name and also the 18th time that the Rey de Reyes tournament was held.

== Production ==
=== Background ===
Starting in 1997 and every year since then the Mexican Lucha Libre, or professional wrestling, company Lucha Libre AAA World Wide (AAA, or Triple A) has held a Rey de Reyes (Spanish for "King of Kings') show in the spring. The 1997 version was held in February, while all subsequent Rey de Reyes shows were held in March. As part of their annual Rey de Reyes event AAA holds the eponymious Rey de Reyes tournament to determine that specific year's Rey. Most years the show hosts both the qualifying round and the final match, but on occasion the qualifying matches have been held prior to the event as part of AAA's weekly television shows. The traditional format consists of four preliminary rounds, each a Four-man elimination match with each of the four winners face off in the tournament finals, again under elimination rules. There have been years where AAA has employed a different format to determine a winner. The winner of the Rey de Reyes tournament is given a large ornamental sword to symbolize their victory, but is normally not guaranteed any other rewards for winning the tournament, although some years becoming the Rey de Reyes has earned the winner a match for the AAA Mega Championship. From 1999 through 2009 AAA also held an annual Reina de Reinas ("Queen of Queens") tournament, but later turned that into an actual championship that could be defended at any point during the year, abandoning the annual tournament concept. The 2014 show was the 18th Rey de Reyes show in the series.

=== Storylines ===
The Rey de Reyes show featured seven professional wrestling matches with different wrestlers involved in pre-existing, scripted feuds, plots, and storylines. Wrestlers were portrayed as either heels (referred to as rudos in Mexico, those that portray the "bad guys") or faces (técnicos in Mexico, the "good guy" characters) as they followed a series of tension-building events, which culminated in a wrestling match or series of matches.

== Results ==
No.	Results	Stipulations
1	Alan Stone, Dinastía, Faby Apache and Pimpinela Escarlata defeated Mamba, Mini Charly Manson, Sexy Star and Silver King	Eight-person tag team match
2	Daga (c) (with Taya) defeated Argenis, Australian Suicide and Super Fly	Four-way elimination match for the AAA Cruiserweight Championship
3	Chessman (with El Hijo del Fantasma) defeated Villano IV (with Alan Stone)	Singles match for the vacant AAA Latin American Championship
4	Fénix defeated Steve Pain; Other participants: Crazy Boy, Eterno, Joe Líder, Niño Hamburguesa, Pentagón Jr. and Último Gladiador	Eight-way Domo de la Muerte Masks vs. Hairs Lucha de Apuestas
5	Los Güeros del Cielo (Angélico and Jack Evans) (c) defeated Aero Star and Drago, Los Inferno Rockers (Demon Rocker and Machine Rocker) and La Sociedad (El Hijo del Fantasma and Psicosis)	Four-way tag team elimination match for the AAA World Tag Team Championship
6	Cibernético, Electroshock and Psycho Clown (with Joaquín Roldán) defeated La Sociedad (Jeff Jarrett, Máscara Año 2000 Jr. and El Texano Jr.) (with Dorian Roldán and Karen Jarrett)	Six-man tag team match
7	La Parka defeated Black Warrior, El Hijo del Perro Aguayo and El Zorro	Four-way elimination Rey de Reyes tournament final match
(c) / – the champion(s) heading into the match

=== Tournament bracket ===
1st Round; Sin Limite; January 25 – February 21, 2014 (Aired: February 1 – March 1)
El Mesias	—
El Zorro	Win (Note: This was a four-way elimination match.)
Fénix	—
Silver Cain	—
Blue Demon Jr.	—
Chessman	—
La Parka	Win (Note: Order of elimination: Blue Demon Jr. and Chessman by double countout, La Parka Negra)
La Parka Negra	—
Cibernético	—
El Elegido	—
El Hijo del Perro Aguayo	Win (Note: Order of elimination: El Elegido, Electroshock, Cibernético)
Electroshock	—
Black Warrior	Win (Note: Order of elimination: Psicosis, El Texano Jr. by Disqualification, Psycho Clown)
El Texano Jr.	—
Psicosis	—
Psycho Clown	—

Final; Sin Limite: Rey de Reyes; March 16, 2014 (Aired: March 29)
El Zorro	—
La Parka	Win (Note: Order of elimination: Black Warrior, El Zorro, El Hijo del Perro Aguayo)
El Hijo del Perro Aguayo	—
Black Warrior	—
