= Triplemanía XXII =

2014 Lucha Libre AAA Worldwide event

- Promotional poster featuring various AAA wrestlers
- Promotion: AAA
- Date: August 17, 2014
- City: Mexico City
- Venue: Arena Ciudad de México
- Attendance: 21,000

Pay-per-view chronology
| ← Previous; Verano de Escándalo | Next → Héroes Inmortales VIII |

Triplemanía chronology
| ← Previous; XXI | Next → XXIII |

Triplemanía XXII was a professional wrestling pay-per-view (PPV) produced by the AAA promotion. It took place on August 17, 2014, at Arena Ciudad de México in Mexico City, Mexico. The event was the twenty-second annual Triplemanía, which is AAA's biggest show of the year, airing in Mexico as a regular PPV and internationally as an internet pay-per-view (iPPV). This was the first AAA PPV event to be broadcast simultaneously in English through SAP, having Hugo Savinovich and Vampiro as announcers.

Alberto Del Rio, who was fired from WWE more than a week prior, made an appearance at the event. WWE wrestler Rey Mysterio also appeared in a video package to end the show. Jeff Jarrett and Ricochet were advertised for the event, but both missed the event due to travel issues.

== Production ==
=== Background ===
In early 1992 Antonio Peña was working as a booker and storyline writer for Consejo Mundial de Lucha Libre (CMLL), Mexico's largest and the world's oldest wrestling promotion, and was frustrated by CMLL's very conservative approach to lucha libre. He joined forced with a number of younger, very talented wrestlers who felt like CMLL was not giving them recognition they deserved and decided to split from CMLL to create Asistencia Asesoría y Administración (AAA, or Triple A; Spanish for "Assistance, Consulting, and Administration" later renamed AAA). After making a deal with the Televisa television network AAA held their first show in April, 1992. The following year Peña and AAA held their first Triplemanía event, building it into an annual event that would become AAA's Super Bowl event, similar to the WWE's WrestleMania being the biggest show of the year. The 2014 Triplemanía was the 22nd year in a row AAA held a Triplemanía show and the 26th overall show under the Triplemanía banner. In February 2014, it was announced that Triplemanía XXII would be held in the Arena Ciudad de México in Mexico City, Mexico, for the third consecutive year; this would be the eighth time that Mexico City would host Triplemanía.

There were multiple options to watch Triplemanía XXII: via traditional pay-per-view on the SKY television service at $229 (Mexican peso) for standard-definition and $298 for high-definition, or via Internet pay-per-view (iPPV) at $194. This would be the seventh year Triplemanía would be available through SKY. The iPPV was available on AAA's official website, www.luchalibreaaa.com. This was the promotion's first iPPV in a year after problems arose when Triplemanía XXI was shown on iPPV.

=== Storylines ===
The Triplemanía XXII show featured six professional wrestling matches with different wrestlers involved in pre-existing scripted feuds, plots and storylines. Wrestlers were portrayed as either heels (referred to as rudos in Mexico, those that portray the "bad guys") or faces (técnicos in Mexico, the "good guy" characters) as they followed a series of tension-building events, which culminated in a wrestling match or series of matches.

AAA frequently has eight person tag team matches open their major events, usually featuring on each team a high-flying wrestler, a female luchadora, an exótico (in drag) and a Mini-Estrella. The opening match for Triplemanía XXII featured two feuds, one between former team-mates of the Real Fuerza Aérea faction, Aero Star and Súper Fly, and another feud between Pimpinela Escarlata and Mamba.

The second match on the card had a complicated buildup. Bengala won an elimination match to become the number one contender to Daga's AAA Cruiserweight Championship. However, after AAA Fusión Champion Fenix pinned Daga in a six-man tag team match, Fenix also wanted to challenge for Daga's title, and he was willing to put his own title on the line at the same time. Daga agreed to the title challenges, after-which a multi-man elimination match to unify the AAA Cruiserweight and AAA Fusión Championship was set up for Triplemanía XXII, with several other wrestlers added to the match as well; those being Angélico, Australian Suicide, El Hijo del Fantasma, Jack Evans, Joe Líder, Pentagón Jr and Ricochet.

The third match, for the AAA Reina de Reinas Championship, was set up when Taya won a number one contender elimination match in June 2014 over Cynthia Moreno, La Jarochita, La Magnifica, Mari Apache, Sexy Lady and Sexy Star. Taya was described to have been feuding with champion Faby Apache "for quite some time".

The fourth match, where the last wrestler to escape the cage would lose his mask or hair, had little buildup. The storyline leading into the match was Jeff Jarrett's rivalry against Mexican wrestlers. Blue Demon Jr, Electro Shock and La Parka represented the técnicos of Ejercito AAA, while Averno, Chessman and Jarrett being the rudos. To set up the match, Jarrett attacked Electro Shock with a guitar and drew blood in Querétaro in June 2014.

The four-way match originally promoted as second to the main event was for the Copa Triplemanía XXII, and also featured little buildup. This would be Myzteziz's first major event for AAA since his in-ring debut, and he would once again face one of his hottest rivals, Perro Aguayo Jr. AAA announced a surprise entrant for the match, which was revealed as Dr. Wagner Jr. in his return to the promotion. Wagner Jr. started a rivalry with the final entrant, Cibernético, heading into the match.

For the match originally promoted as the main event, the feud between Psycho Clown and Texano Jr. began due to the rivalry between their respective factions, Los Psycho Circus and El Consejo. Psycho Clown had twice challenged for Texano Jr's AAA Mega Championship, but lost twice due to the referees cheating on behalf of Texano Jr. Despite the AAA Mega Championship not being on the line at Triplemanía XXII, the meeting of the duo was described as "the ultimate match of respect between luchadors" due to the Lucha de Apuestas conditions, where the loser must forfeit his hair (for Texano Jr) or his mask (for Psycho Clown). The feud was seen as a continuation of the historical feud between Los Brazos and Los Misioneros de la Muerte, as Psycho Clown is a descendant of Brazo de Plata of the Alvarado Nieves generation, while Texano Jr. is the son of El Texano.

Alberto Del Rio was fired by WWE on August 7, 2014, with the promotion citing his "unprofessional conduct and an altercation with an employee". Dave Meltzer of The Wrestling Observer reported that "the story going around" was that Del Rio had slapped a manager of social media. Del Rio later said that he reacted to what he felt was a racist comment by a fellow employee by demanding an apology. When the employee responded by smiling, Del Rio slapped him. Del Rio was later ashamed of his reaction but vowed to uphold his own dignity. Additionally, WWE's Twitter account released a message stating that Del Rio "is responsible for his own actions. If you're angry at anyone, be angry at Alberto. There's no excuse for a pro athlete not to conduct themselves in a professional manner." Less than a week after the firing, Del Rio was announced to appear at Triplemanía XXII, but not wrestle, due to a 90-day non-compete clause imposed by WWE. Del Rio previously took part in Triplemanía X in 2002, as Dos Caras Jr.

== Event ==
Triplemanía began with the returning Alberto Del Rio, billed as El Patron Alberto talking about his departure from WWE and the racism within it, before he was interrupted by Konnan and El Hijo del Perro Aguayo A physical altercation occurred starting with El Patron's father, Dos Caras, being assaulted, but El Patron fended off the attackers. In another non-match event, the AAA Hall of Fame welcomed new inductees El Brazo and Rayo de Jalisco Sr.; with the ceremony being interrupted by El Hjo del Perro Aguayo. Meanwhile, Jeff Jarett and Ricochet both missed the event despite being slated to wrestle, with both apologizing for having problems with their airline providers.

Aero Star's team won the opening match when Mascarita Sagrada submitted Mini Abismo Negro.

The order of elimination for the second match was firstly Drago (substituting for Ricochet), Jack Evans, Joe Lider, Australian Suicide, Bengala, Pentagon Jr, (AAA Fusión Champion) Fenix and then (AAA Cruiserweight Champion) Daga. Finally, Hijo del Fantasma used a variant of a piledriver on Angelico to win the match and the new AAA World Cruiserweight Championship.

The third match saw Taya defeating Fabi Apache to capture Apache's AAA Reina de Reinas Championship after a Northern Lights suplex, a stomp variant, and help from rudo referee Hijo del Tirantes. The match was described as "full of screwiness" due to Tirantes, Sexy Star and Hijo del Fantasma. Valkyrie, the first foreigner to win this title, suffered a broken nose in this match.

The fourth match saw Electroshock losing his hair as he lost a steel cage match when El Mesias (substituting for Jeff Jarrett, in his return after a near-eight month absence) escaped the cage after using a double knee backbreaker from the top rope on Electroshock. Prior to that, the order of escape was first La Parka Jr, then Averno, Blue Demon Jr, and Chessman. The match was described as "a total bloodbath full of wild spots".

The fifth match resulted in Texano Jr.being shaved of his hair in the ring after losing to Psycho Clown, who pinned him after a Canadian Destroyer of the top rope through a table. Texano Jr.enjoyed help from Rafael "El Maya" and Hijo del Fantasma, forcing AAA's commissioner Fantasma to expel them from the ringside area. The match was described as "another bloodbath full of table spots and unprotected chair shots to the head". AAA described the result being that Psycho Clown "rompió la maldición de los Alvarado" (broke the curse of Alvarado). The feud ended with a handshake between the duo.

The main event four-way elimination match saw blood from Dr Wagner Jr.and Mysteziz. Cibernetico eliminated Dr Wagner Jr.first after a chokeslam. Then, Mysteziz submitted Cibernetico by applying La Mistica. Finally, Perro Aguayo Jr.low blowed Mysteziz to win the Copa Triplemanía XXII. After the match, El Patron stormed the ring to brawl with Perro Aguayo Jr; with El Patron emerging from the brawl dominant.

The show ended with a video of Rey Mysterio (still contracted to WWE at the time) stating that he would return to AAA "soon".

== Reception ==
21,000 people attended the event in the Arena Ciudad de México.

Josh Boutwell of wrestleview.com praised the opener as "very good", the Cruiserweight title match as "a great, high flying match with tons of action", and the Mask vs. Hair match as "awesome". However, Boutwell was critical of the cage match as "a disaster from the start" and the commentators including Vampiro, which Boutwell described as "one of the worst commentators in the history of wrestling". Lastly, Boutwell blasted the iPPV's "horrible stream" where he "was never able to see more than 1 minute uninterrupted of the stream before [he] gave up on the live show. It is beyond pathetic that after an entire year from the horrible disaster of last year's TripleMania stream this happens."

Adrián López of ESPN.com gave his views on some of the matches, stating that the main event showed the hatred between the competitors, while the penultimate match was an epic struggle and the women's match was dramatic, vibrant and exciting.

== Aftermath ==
Triplemanía XXII was Perro Aguayo Jr's final Triplemanía event, as he died in late March 2015 at the age of 35. Aguayo Jr. died after wrestling a match in Tijuana, Mexico for a promotion called The Crash; he was teaming with Manik against Extreme Tiger and Rey Mysterio Jr. Initial reports stated that the cause of death was cervical spine trauma at the neck.

El Patrón Alberto had his first return match for AAA on September 14, 2014 in a six-man tag match, teaming with La Parka and Myzteziz to defeat Averno, Perro Aguayo Jr.and Texano Jr. On December 7, 2014 at Guerra de Titanes, Alberto defeated Texano Jr.to win the AAA Mega Championship.

Also at Guerra de Titanes, Aero Star defeated Super Fly and thus forced him to unmask; Super Fly's real name was revealed as Erick Aguilar Muñoz.

It was announced in early March 2015 that Rey Mysterio Jr. had joined AAA; he would have his return match for AAA later that month.

After losing his hair, Electroshock teased retiring from professional wrestling. However, Electroshock instead went to form a new faction in 2015 called Holocausto, this group included El Hijo de Pirata Morgan.

== Results ==
| No. | Results | Stipulations | Times |
|---|---|---|---|
| 1 | Aero Star, Jennifer Blake, Mascarita Sagrada and Pimpinela Escarlata defeated Mamba, Mini Abismo Negro, Sexy Star and Súper Fly | Relevos Atómicos de Locura match | 09:38 |
| 2 | El Hijo del Fantasma defeated Daga (c), Fénix (c), Angélico, Australian Suicide, Bengala, Drago, Jack Evans, Joe Líder and Pentagón Jr. | Ten-way elimination match to unify the AAA Fusión and AAA Cruiserweight Championships into the "AAA World Cruiserweight Championship" | 20:00 |
| 3 | Taya (with Sexy Star) defeated Faby Apache (c) (with Drago) | Singles match for the AAA Reina de Reinas Championship | 09:30 |
| 4 | Electroshock lost to Averno, Blue Demon Jr., Chessman, El Mesías and La Parka | Six-way steel cage Hair vs. Mask Lucha de Apuestas | 14:30 |
| 5 | Psycho Clown (with Mini Clown) defeated El Texano Jr. (with El Hijo del Fantasma) | Lucha de Apuestas Hair vs. Mask match | 27:00 |
| 6 | El Hijo del Perro Aguayo defeated Cibernético, Dr. Wagner Jr. (with El Hijo de Dr. Wagner Jr.) and Myzteziz | Four-way elimination match for Copa Triplemanía XXII | 17:00 |
(c) / – the champion(s) heading into the match
