= Rey de Reyes (2013) =

2013 Lucha Libre AAA World Wide event

- Promotional poster featuring various AAA wrestlers
- Promotion: AAA
- Date: March 17, 2013
- City: Monterrey, Nuevo León
- Venue: Plaza de Toros Monumental Lorenzo Garza
- Attendance: 10,000 (approximately)

Event chronology
← Previous; Guerra de Titanes	Next → Triplemanía XXI

Rey de Reyes chronology
← Previous; 2012	Next → 2014

Rey de Reyes (Spanish for "King of Kings") was professional wrestling event produced by the AAA promotion, which took on March 17, 2013, at Plaza de Toros Monumental Lorenzo Garza in Monterrey, Nuevo León, Mexico. The event was the 17th event produced under the Rey de Reyes name and also the 17th time that the Rey de Reyes tournament was held.

== Production ==
=== Background ===
Starting in 1997 and every year since then the Mexican Lucha Libre, or professional wrestling, company AAA has held a Rey de Reyes (Spanish for "King of Kings') show in the spring. The 1997 version was held in February, while all subsequent Rey de Reyes shows were held in March. As part of their annual Rey de Reyes event AAA holds the eponymious Rey de Reyes tournament to determine that specific year's Rey. Most years the show hosts both the qualifying round and the final match, but on occasion the qualifying matches have been held prior to the event as part of AAA's weekly television shows. The traditional format consists of four preliminary rounds, each a Four-man elimination match with each of the four winners face off in the tournament finals, again under elimination rules. There have been years where AAA has employed a different format to determine a winner. The winner of the Rey de Reyes tournament is given a large ornamental sword to symbolize their victory, but is normally not guaranteed any other rewards for winning the tournament, although some years becoming the Rey de Reyes has earned the winner a match for the AAA Mega Championship. From 1999 through 2009 AAA also held an annual Reina de Reinas ("Queen of Queens") tournament, but later turned that into an actual championship that could be defended at any point during the year, abandoning the annual tournament concept. The 2013 show was the 17th Rey de Reyes show in the series.

=== Storylines ===
The Rey de Reyes show featured eight professional wrestling matches with different wrestlers involved in pre-existing, scripted feuds, plots, and storylines. Wrestlers were portrayed as either heels (referred to as rudos in Mexico, those that portray the "bad guys") or faces (técnicos in Mexico, the "good guy" characters) as they followed a series of tension-building events, which culminated in a wrestling match or series of matches.

== Results ==
No.	Results	Stipulations
1	Fénix defeated Crazy Boy, Daga and Juventud Guerrera	Four-way elimination tournament final match for the AAA Fusión Championship
2	Los Inferno Rockers (Devil Rocker, Machine Rocker and Soul Rocker) defeated Los Psycho Circus (Monster Clown, Murder Clown and Psycho Clown)	Six-man tag team match
3	El Mesías defeated Heavy Metal, Octagón, La Parka, La Parka Negra and Pentagón Jr.	Six-way elimination Rey de Reyes tournament semifinal match
4	L.A. Park defeated Chessman, Drago, Jack Evans, Psicosis and Villano IV	Six-way elimination Rey de Reyes tournament semifinal match
5	Canek defeated Cibernético, Electroshock, El Hijo del Perro Aguayo, Silver King and Toscano	Six-way elimination Rey de Reyes tournament semifinal match
6	Faby Apache defeated LuFisto, Mari Apache and Taya	Four-way elimination tournament final match for the AAA Reina de Reinas Championship
7	El Texano Jr. (c) defeated Blue Demon Jr.	Singles match for the AAA Mega Championship
8	El Mesías defeated Canek and L.A. Park	Three-way elimination Rey de Reyes tournament final match
(c) / – the champion(s) heading into the match

=== Rey de Reyes tournament bracket ===
Tournament bracket

1st Round; Fusion: Rey de Reyes; March 17, 2013 (Aired: March 23)
El Mesías	Win (Note: This was a six-way elimination match.) (Note: Order of elimination: Octagón, Pentagón Jr., Heavy Metal, La Parka Negra, La Parka)
Heavy Metal	—
Octagón	—
La Parka	—
La Parka Negra	—
Pentagón Jr.	—
Chessman	—
Drago	—
Jack Evans	—
L.A. Park	Win (Note: Order of elimination: Drago, Jack Evans and Psicosis, Chessman, Villano IV)
Psicosis	—
Villano IV	—
Canek	Win (Note: Order of elimination: Toscano, Silver King, El Hijo del Perro Aguayo by Disqualification, Cibernético, Electroshock)
Cibernético	—
Electroshock	—
El Hijo del Perro Aguayo	—
Silver King	—
Toscano	—

Final; Fusion: Rey de Reyes; March 17, 2013 (Aired: March 30)
El Mesías	Win (Note: This was a three-way elimination match. Order of elimination: Canek, L.A. Park)
L.A. Park	—
Canek	—

=== Reina de Reinas tournament bracket ===
Tournament bracket

1st Round; Fusion; March 1, 2013 (Aired: March 6–13)
Lolita	—
Mary Apache	Win
Jennifer Blake	—
Taya	Win
Cynthia Moreno	—
LuFisto	Win
Faby Apache	Win
Sexy Lady	—

Final; Sin Limite: Rey de Reyes; March 17, 2013 (Aired: April 4)
Mary Apache	—
Taya	—
LuFisto	— (Note: This was a four-way elimination match. Order of elimination: LuFisto, Taya, Mary Apache)
Faby Apache	Win

=== Inaugural AAA Fusión Championship tournament bracket ===
This single-elimination tournament was for the inaugural [AAA Fusión Champion. The tournament began on the November 14, 2012 episode of Fusion (taped on November 3, 2012) and culminated at Fusion: Rey de Reyes on March 17, 2013 (aired on April 4). The tournament featured 16 participants and two rounds. Each round consisted of four-way elimination matches. The tournament winner and inaugural champion was Fénix.

Tournament bracket

1st Round; Fusion; November 3, 2012 – March 1, 2013 (Aired: November 14, 2012 – March 13, 2013)
Dark Dragon	—
Drago	—
Fénix	Win (Note: This was a four-way elimination match.) (Note: Order of elimination: Toscano, Drago, Dark Dragon)
Toscano	—
Daga	Win
Jack Evans	—
Joe Lider	—
Psicosis	—
Angélico	—
Crazy Boy	Win (Note: Order of elimination: Super Fly, Halloween, Angélico)
Halloween	—
Super Fly	—
Aero Star	—
Juventud Guerrera	Win (Note: Order of elimination: Último Gladiador, Aero Star, Pentagón Jr.)
Pentagón Jr.	—
Último Gladiador	—

Final; Fusion: Rey de Reyes; March 17, 2013 (Aired: April 4)
Fénix	Win (Note: Order of elimination: Crazy Boy, Juventud Guerrera, Daga)
Daga	—
Crazy Boy	—
Juventud Guerrera	—
