= AAA Fusión Championship =

Professional wrestling championship

AAA Fusión Championship Campeonato AAA Fusión
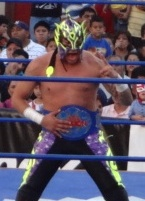
- Fénix, the inaugural AAA Fusión Champion posing with the title belt

Details
- Promotion: AAA
- Date established: November 3, 2012
- Date retired: August 17, 2014
Statistics
- First champion: Fénix
- Longest reign: Fénix (518 days)
- Shortest reign: El Hijo del Fantasma (<1 days)
- Oldest champion: El Hijo del Fantasma (30 years, 108 days)
- Youngest champion: Fénix (22 years, 77 days)
- Heaviest champion: El Hijo del Fantasma (90 kg (200 lb))
- Lightest champion: Fénix (74 kg (163 lb))

The AAA Fusión Championship ("Campeonato AAA Fusión" in Spanish) was a professional wrestling championship promoted by the AAA promotion in Mexico. The first champion was crowned on March 17, 2013, when Fénix won a tournament for the title. On August 17, 2014, the title was unified with the AAA Cruiserweight Championship.

The championship was generally contested in professional wrestling matches, in which participants execute scripted finishes rather than contend in direct competition.

== History ==
In late 2012, AAA introduced a new television program, titled AAA Fusión, which would start airing alongside the promotion's primary television program, Sin Límite. The first show was taped on September 30, 2012. The following November, AAA started a tournament to determine the inaugural AAA Fusión Champion. On April 23, 2013, AAA split its entire roster into two brands; AAA Evolución and AAA Fusión, with the AAA Fusión Championship becoming exclusive to the latter. On June 27, 2014, AAA announced that the AAA Fusión Championship and the AAA Cruiserweight Championship would be unified on August 17 at Triplemanía XXII. El Hijo del Fantasma won the ten-way elimination match to unify the two titles into the new "AAA World Cruiserweight Championship".

=== Inaugural championship tournament ===
This single-elimination tournament was for the inaugural [AAA Fusión Champion. The tournament began on the November 14, 2012 episode of Fusion (taped on November 3, 2012) and culminated at Fusion: Rey de Reyes on March 17, 2013 (aired on April 4). The tournament featured 16 participants and two rounds. Each round consisted of four-way elimination matches. The tournament winner and inaugural champion was Fénix.

Tournament bracket

1st Round; Fusion; November 3, 2012 – March 1, 2013 (Aired: November 14, 2012 – March 13, 2013)
Dark Dragon	—
Drago	—
Fénix	Win (Note: This was a four-way elimination match.) (Note: Order of elimination: Toscano, Drago, Dark Dragon)
Toscano	—
Daga	Win
Jack Evans	—
Joe Lider	—
Psicosis	—
Angélico	—
Crazy Boy	Win (Note: Order of elimination: Super Fly, Halloween, Angélico)
Halloween	—
Super Fly	—
Aero Star	—
Juventud Guerrera	Win (Note: Order of elimination: Último Gladiador, Aero Star, Pentagón Jr.)
Pentagón Jr.	—
Último Gladiador	—

Final; Fusion: Rey de Reyes; March 17, 2013 (Aired: April 4)
Fénix	Win (Note: Order of elimination: Crazy Boy, Juventud Guerrera, Daga)
Daga	—
Crazy Boy	—
Juventud Guerrera	—

== Title history ==
Key
No.	Overall reign number
Reign	Reign number for the specific champion
Days	Number of days held
<1	Reign lasted less than a day

No.	Champion	Championship change			Reign statistics		Notes	Ref.
No.	Champion	Date	Event	Location	Reign	Days	Notes	Ref.
Lucha Libre AAA Worldwide (AAA)
1	Fénix	March 17, 2013	Rey de Reyes (2013)	Monterrey, Nuevo León	1	518	Fénix defeated Crazy Boy, Daga and Juventud Guerrera in a four-way elimination tournament final to become the inaugural champion. This episode aired on tape delay on April 4, 2013.	
2	El Hijo del Fantasma	August 17, 2014	Triplemanía XXII	Mexico City	1	<1	This was a ten-way elimination match, also contested for the AAA Cruiserweight Championship and involving Angélico, Australian Suicide, Bengala, Daga, Drago, Jack Evans, Joe Líder and Pentagón Jr.	
—	Deactivated	August 17, 2014	Triplemanía XXII	Mexico City	—	—	Title unified with the AAA Cruiserweight Championship to create the "AAA World Cruiserweight Championship".	
