= AAA World Cruiserweight Championship =

Professional wrestling championship

AAA World Cruiserweight Championship (Campeonato Mundial Crucero AAA)
- The current AAA World Cruiserweight Championship belt

Details
- Promotion: Lucha Libre AAA Worldwide; WWE
- Date established: May 21, 2009
- Current champion: Rey Fénix
- Date won: May 30, 2026

Other names
- AAA Cruiserweight Championship (May 2009–August 2014); AAA World Cruiserweight Championship (August 2014–present)
Statistics
- First champion: Alex Koslov
- Most reigns: 2 reigns: Alex Koslov; Xtreme Tiger; Laredo Kid; Rey Fénix
- Longest reign: Laredo Kid (1st reign, 1,218 days)
- Shortest reign: Alex Koslov (2nd reign, 9 days)
- Oldest champion: Juventud Guerrera (37 years, 178 days)
- Youngest champion: Daga (24 years, 136 days)
- Heaviest champion: Johnny Mundo (98 kg (216 lb))
- Lightest champion: Xtreme Tiger (67 kg (148 lb))

The AAA World Cruiserweight Championship (Spanish: Campeonato Mundial Crucero AAA) is a professional wrestling championship promoted by the Mexican promotion Lucha Libre AAA Worldwide (AAA), which is also open to wrestlers from sister promotion of WWE. The championship cannot be competed for by anyone who is over the Cruiserweight division weight limit of 110 kg (240 lb). Traditionally, this division is labeled as the "Junior Heavyweight" division in Mexico while "Cruiserweight" is a term more used in the United States or Canada. The current champion is Rey Fénix, who is in his second reign. He won the title by defeating Laredo Kid at Noche de Los Grandes on May 30, 2026.

The championship was originally named the AAA Cruiserweight Championship. but had the word "world" added to the name after El Hijo del Fantasma won a match on August 17, 2014, that unified the championship with the AAA Fusión Championship. A total of 14 men have held the championship for a total of sixteen different title reigns.

== History ==
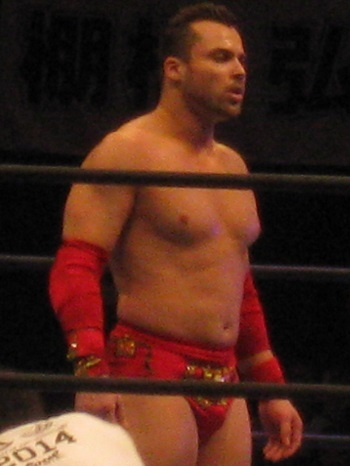
Inaugural champion Alex Koslov

A single-elimination tournament was held to crown the inaugural AAA World Cruiserweight Championship during the tapings of Sin Limite from March 20, 2009 to May 21, 2009. The tournament began with a 13-man Domo de la Muerte match with participants entering at regular intervals to determine the 12 participants and matchups in the quarterfinals. The order in which competitors successfully escaped the cage determined their seeding for the quarterfinal matchups. The last participant remaining in the cage was eliminated from the tournament. Alex Koslov won the tournament by defeating Alan Stone and Xtreme Tiger in the three-way tournament final at Sin Limite.

Inaugural championship tournament bracket

1st Round (Note: This was a Domo de la Muerte match with participants entering at regular intervals. The order in which competitors successfully escaped the cage determined their seeding for the quarterfinal matchups. The last participant remaining in the cage was eliminated from the tournament.); Sin Limite; March 20, 2009 (Aired: April 5)
Alan Stone	#3
Alex Koslov	#5
Billy Boy	Lost
Crazy Boy	#4
Escoria	#10
Xtreme Tiger	#9
Jack Evans	#12
Joe Lider	#11
Juventud Guerrera	#8
Laredo Kid	#6
Nicho el Millonario	#2
Super Fly	#7
Teddy Hart	#1

Quarterfinals; Sin Limite; March 22 – April 17, 2009 (Aired: April 12–26)
1	Teddy Hart	13:16
12	Jack Evans	Win
4	Crazy Boy	9:05
9	Xtreme Tiger	Win
2	Nicho el Millionario	Win
11	Joe Lider	—
5	Alex Koslov	Win
8	Rocky Romero (Note: Rocky Romero replaced Juventud Guerrera in the tournament.)	5:36
3	Alan Stone	Win
10	Escoria	2:52
6	Laredo Kid	Win
7	Super Fly	6:26

Semifinals; Sin Limite; April 21 – May 18, 2009 (Aired: May 3–24)
12	Jack Evans	Pinfall (9:46)	8:28
9	Xtreme Tiger	Pinfall (9:46)	Win
2	Nicho el Millionario	9:57
5	Alex Koslov	Win
3	Alan Stone	Win
6	Laredo Kid	—

Final (Note: This was a Hardcore Elimination match.); Sin Limite; May 21, 2009 (Aired: May 31)
9	Xtreme Tiger	— (Note: Xtreme Tiger was eliminated last by Alex Koslov)
5	Alex Koslov	Win
3	Alan Stone	— (Note: Alan Stone was eliminated first by Xtreme Tiger)

On August 17, 2014, at Triplemanía XXII, the Cruiserweight Champion Daga defended the title in a 10-man elimination match, where also participated the AAA Fusion Champion Fénix. El Hijo del Fantasma won the match and unified both titles, deactivating the Fusion Championship and renaming the title as AAA World Cruiserweight Championship. On February 10, 2021, the champion Laredo Kid faced the Major League Wrestling's World Middleweight Champion Lio Rush in a title vs. title match. Despite Rush winning the match and being recognized as champion, a few days later AAA did not recognize the title change. Instead, Laredo Kid appeared on AAA show with the title belt. According to Konnan, an AAA booker, Rush lost the title back to Laredo Kid in an un-televised match. On May 5, Laredo Kid appeared in MLW Fusion with the AAA title, making an in-character statement where he refused to recognize Rush as champion.

On the June 26, 2026, episode of WWE SmackDown taped on June 23, the AAA World Cruiserweight Championship was defended in WWE for the first time as Rey Fenix successfully retained the title against Nathan Frazer. On the September 28 episode of WWE Raw, Fénix announced that the title would now be officially open to all brands under the WWE banner, with the champion able to defend the title on any show.

== Reigns ==
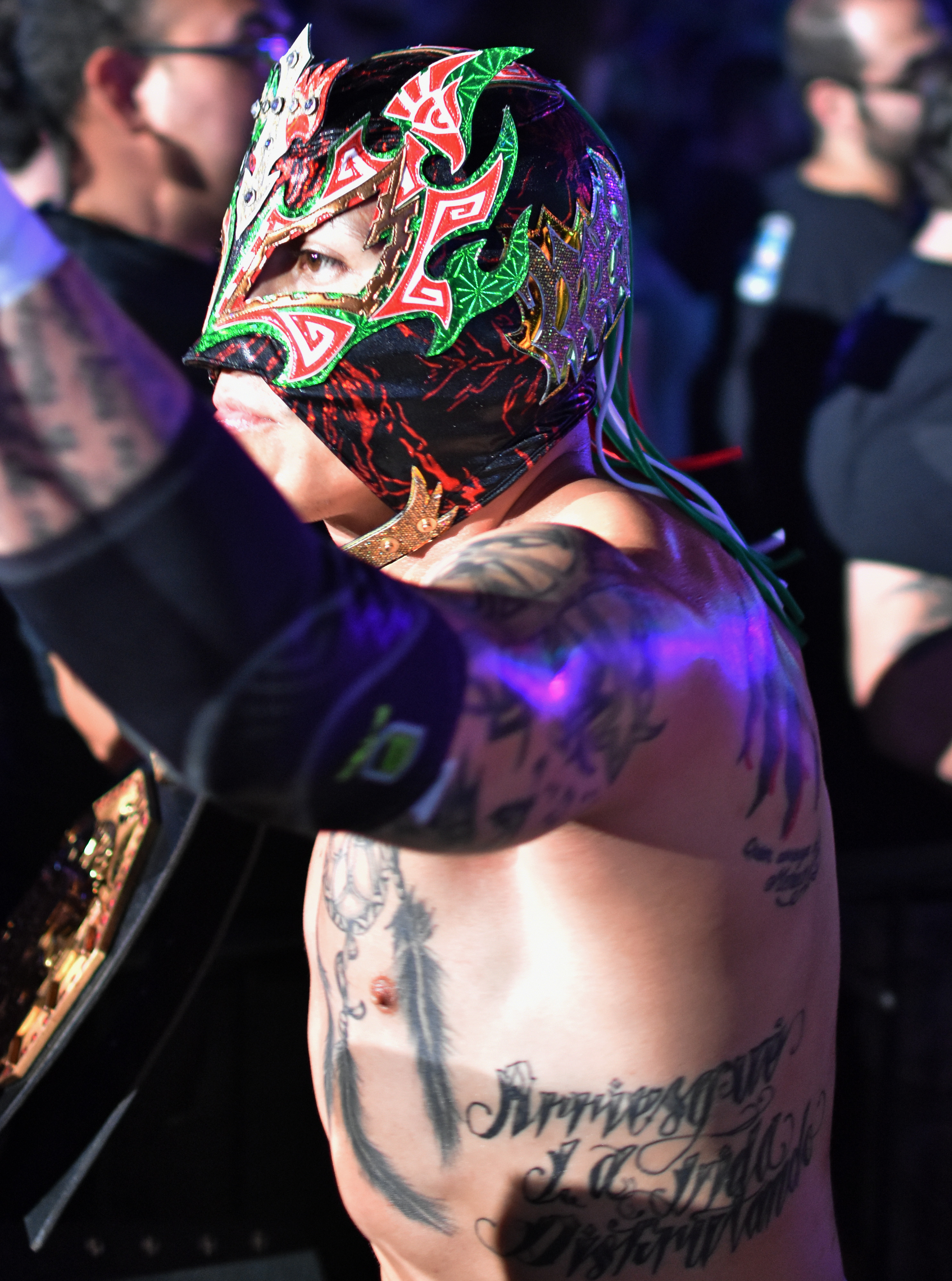
Two-time and current champion Rey Fénix

Overall, there have been 18 official reigns among 14 champions and two vacancies. The inaugural champion is Alex Koslov. Laredo Kid holds the longest reign at 1,218 days. During his reign, Kid was defeated by Lio Rush in a unification match to unify the AAA World Cruiserweight Championship with Rush's MLW World Middleweight Championship, although this reign was not recognized by AAA. Koslov holds the shortest reign at 9 days. Koslov, Kid, Xtreme Tiger, and Rey Fénix have held the title the most times with 2 championship reigns. The oldest champion is Juventud Guerrera who won at the age of 37 years and 178 days, while the youngest champion is Daga who won at the age of 24 years and 136 days.

Rey Fénix is the current champion, who is in his second reign. He won the title by defeating Laredo Kid at Noche de Los Grandes on May 30, 2026 in Monterrey, Nuevo León, Mexico.

Name	Duration
AAA Cruiserweight Championship	May 21, 2009 – August 17, 2014
AAA World Cruiserweight Championship	August 17, 2014 – present

Key
No.	Overall reign number
Reign	Reign number for the specific champion
Days	Number of days held
Days recog.	Number of days held recognized by the promotion
+	Current reign is changing daily

No.	Champion	Championship change			Reign statistics			Notes	Ref.
No.	Champion	Date	Event	Location	Reign	Days	Days recog.	Notes	Ref.
Lucha Libre AAA Worldwide (AAA)
1	Alex Koslov	May 21, 2009	Sin Limite	Aguascalientes City, Aguascalientes, Mexico	1	23	13	Defeated Alan Stone and Xtreme Tiger in the tournament final to become the inaugural champion. Aired on May 31.	
2	Xtreme Tiger	June 13, 2009	Triplemanía XVII	Mexico City, Mexico	1	69	85	This four-way elimination hardcore match also featured Alan Stone and Crazy Boy.	
3	Alex Koslov	August 21, 2009	Verano de Escándalo	Ciudad Madero, Tamaulipas, Mexico	2	9	14	five-way elimination match also featured Jack Evans, Rocky Romero, and Teddy Hart. Aired on September 6.	
—	Vacated	August 30, 2009	Sin Limite	Tlalnepantla, Mexico	—	—	—	Alex Koslov lost a six-man steel cage match where the last man left in the cage was forced out of AAA. Aired on September 20.	
4	Xtreme Tiger	September 26, 2009	Héroes Inmortales III	Monterrey, Nuevo León, Mexico	2	253	253	Defeated Jack Evans, Rocky Romero, Sugi San, and Teddy Hart to win the vacant title.	
5	Jack Evans	June 6, 2010	Triplemanía XVIII	Mexico City, Mexico	1	713	735	This four-way elimination match also featured Christopher Daniels and Nosawa Rongai.	
6	Juventud Guerrera	May 19, 2012	Noche de Campeones	Chilpancingo, Guerrero, Mexico	1	197	192	This four-way extreme match also featured Psicosis and Teddy Hart. Aired on June 10.	
7	Daga	December 2, 2012	Guerra de Titanes	Zapopan, Jalisco, Mexico	1	623	606	This six-way ladder match also featured Fénix, Jack Evans, Joe Líder, and Psicosis. Aired on December 19.	
8	El Hijo del Fantasma	August 17, 2014	Triplemanía XXII	Mexico City, Mexico	1	945	945	This ten-way elimination match also featured AAA Fusión Champion Fénix, Angélico, Australian Suicide, Bengala, Drago, Jack Evans, Joe Líder, and Pentagón Jr.. This unified the AAA Cruiserweight Championship and the AAA Fusión Championship into the "AAA World Cruiserweight Championship".	
9	Johnny Mundo	March 19, 2017	Rey de Reyes	Monterrey, Nuevo León, Mexico	1	196	196	Winner Takes All triple threat match for the AAA Mega Championship, AAA Latin American Championship, and AAA World Cruiserweight Championship also featured El Hijo del Fantasma and El Texano Jr..	
10	Lanzeloth	October 1, 2017	Héroes Inmortales XI	San Luis Potosí City, San Luis Potosí, Mexico	1	117	117	This ten-way match also featured Angelikal, Dragon Solar, El Hijo del Vikingo, Máscara de Bronce, Solaris, Tiger Boy, Venum, and Villano III Jr..	
11	Australian Suicide	January 26, 2018	Guerra de Titanes	Mexico City, Mexico	1	211	211		
12	Sammy Guevara	August 25, 2018	Triplemanía XXVI	Mexico City, Mexico	1	175	175	This four-way match also featured A. C. H. and Shane Strickland.	
13	Laredo Kid	February 16, 2019	AAA	Morelia, Michoacán, Mexico	1	1,218	1,218		
†	Lio Rush	February 10, 2021	MLW Fusion	Orlando, Florida, U.S.	—	—	—	Defeated Laredo Kid in a Winner Takes All match for the AAA World Cruiserweight Championship and the MLW World Middleweight Championship. However, AAA does not recognize Rush as champion.	
14	Fénix	June 18, 2022	Triplemanía XXX: Tijuana	Tijuana, Mexico	1	394	394	This Winner Takes All match for the AAA World Cruiserweight Championship and the AAA Latin American Championship also involved Taurus, Bandido, and Hijo del Vikingo.	
—	Vacated	July 17, 2023	—	—	—	—	—	Fénix left AAA due to commitments with other promotions.	
15	Komander	September 23, 2023	Luchando Por Mexico	Mexico City, Mexico	1	329	294	Defeated Kuukai, Mecha Wolf 450, and La Estrella in a four-way match to win the vacant title.	
16	Matt Riddle	August 17, 2024	Triplemanía XXXII: Mexico City	Aguascalientes, Mexico	1	112	112	This three-way match also featured Laredo Kid.	
17	Laredo Kid	December 7, 2024	Cierre De La Gira Origenes	Mexico City, Mexico	2	539	539		
WWE and Lucha Libre AAA Worldwide (AAA)
18	Rey Fénix	May 30, 2026	Noche de Los Grandes	Monterrey, Nuevo León, Mexico	2	161+	161+	On the September 28, 2026, episode of WWE Raw, Fénix announced that the title would now be officially open to all brands under the WWE banner, with the champion able to defend the title on any show.	

== Combined reigns ==
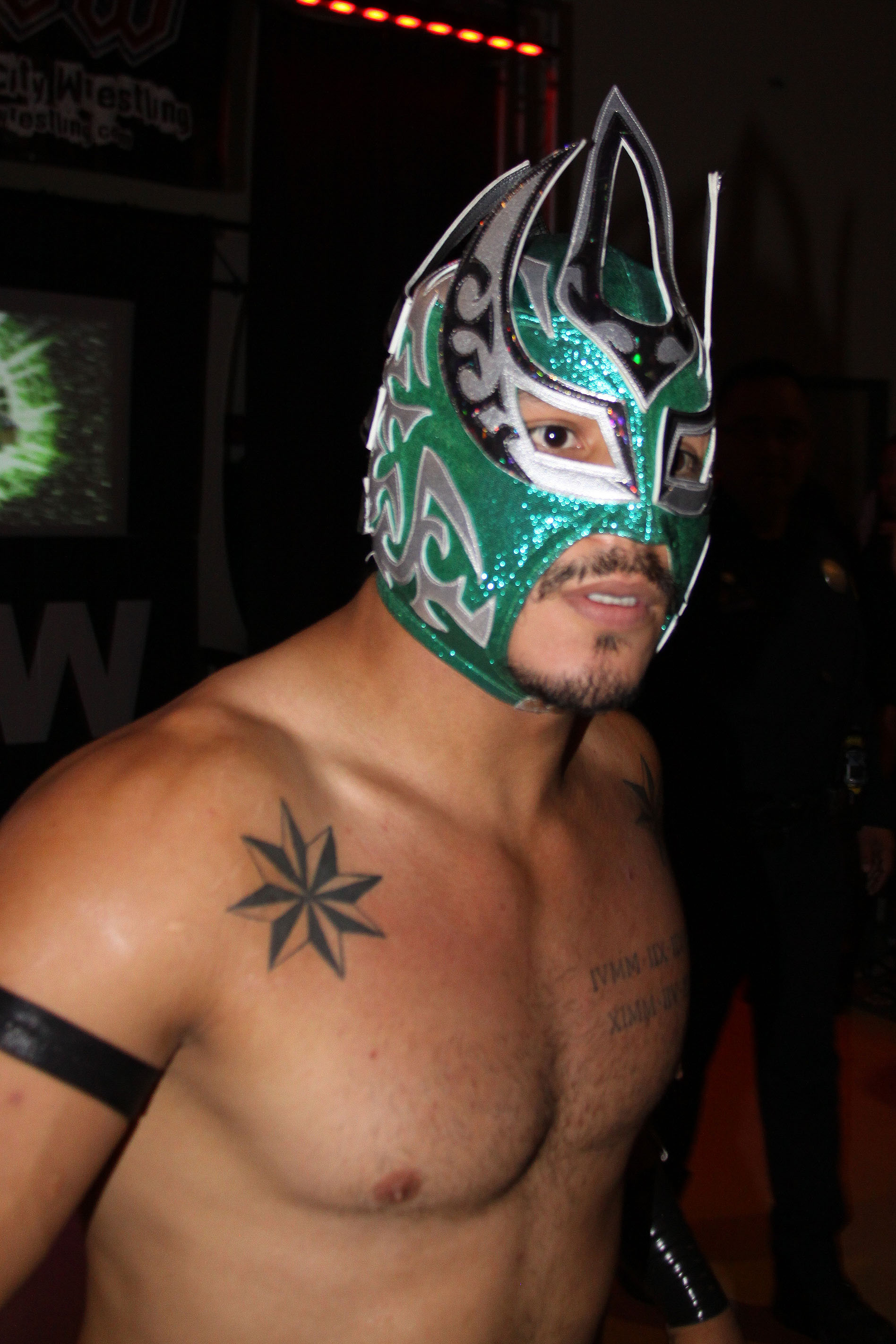
Two-time champion Laredo Kid holds the record for longest combined days at 1,757 and the longest single reign at 1,218 days.

As of November 7, 2026

Rec	Recognized by the promotion
†	Current champion; reign changing daily

Rank	Champion	No. of reigns	Combined days	
Rank	Champion	No. of reigns	Actual	Recognized by AAA
1	Laredo Kid	2	1,757	
2	El Hijo del Fantasma	1	945	
3	Jack Evans	1	713	735
4	Daga	1	623	606
5	Fénix/Rey Fénix †	2	555+	
6	Komander	1	329	294
7	Xtreme Tiger	2	322	338
8	Australian Suicide	1	211	
9	Juventud Guerrera	1	197	192
10	Johnny Mundo	1	196	
11	Sammy Guevara	1	175	
12	Lanzeloth	1	117	
13	Matt Riddle	1	112	
14	Alex Koslov	2	32	27

== See also ==
- List of current champions in Lucha Libre AAA Worldwide
- WWF Light Heavyweight Championship, a similar championship originally created by UWA in 1981 in conjunction with the WWF
- WWE Cruiserweight Championship, a similar title originally created by WCW in 1996
- NXT Cruiserweight Championship, WWE's first in-house cruiserweight championship from 2016 to 2022
