= Daga (wrestler) =

Mexican professional wrestler

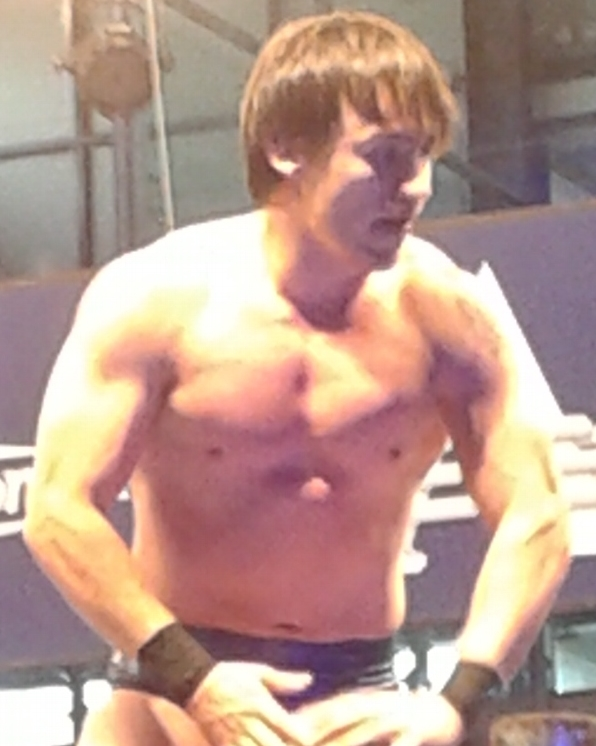
- Daga in 2012

Personal information
- Born: Miguel Ángel Olivo Castro; June 19, 1988 (age 38) Coacalco de Berriozábal, Mexico
- Spouse: Tessa Blanchard (m. 2020; div. 2023)

Professional wrestling career
- Ring name(s): Daga; Leyenda Americana; Roco
- Billed height: 1.73 m (5 ft 8 in)
- Billed weight: 82 kg (181 lb)
- Billed from: Coacalco de Berriozabal, Mexico
- Trained by: Negro Navarro; Black Terry; Ringo Mendoza; Justiciero
- Debut: January 27, 2008

Miguel Ángel Olivo Castro (born June 19, 1988) is a Mexican professional wrestler. He is signed to WWE, where he performs on sister promotion Lucha Libre AAA Worldwide and on the NXT brand under the ring name Daga and is the second leader of Los Perros del Mal. He is one-third of the AAA World Trios Champions with stablemates Angel and Berto in their first reign both as a stable and individually. He is best known for his time in Pro Wrestling Noah and Impact Wrestling. He also previously performed for Xtreme Latin American Wrestling and Lucha Underground.

== Professional wrestling career ==
=== Early career (2008–2011) ===
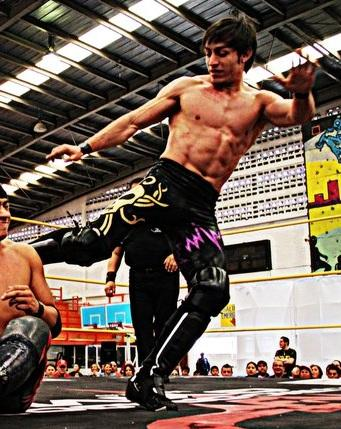
Daga during a match in 2011

Daga made his pro wrestling debut in 2008, wrestling for Profesionales de la Lucha Libre Mexicana (PROLLM) and freelance shows in Coacalco de Berriozábal. He then made his International Wrestling Revolution Group debut in 2009. He spent the next two years in the promotion. Also, Daga worked with other independent promotions, like Toryumon Mexico, International Wrestling League and Desastre Total Ultraviolento. On September 25, 2010, Daga won his first pro wrestling championship, the IWL Internet Championship. On December 18, 2010, Daga participated in a tournament to crown the first DTU Alto Impacto Champion, but he was defeated by Flamita.

=== Lucha Libre AAA Worldwide (2011–2017) ===
Daga made his first appearance in Lucha Libre AAA Worldwide in 2011. In 2012, Daga became a regular wrestler, working with Los Perros del Mal or La Sociedad stables. At Héroes Inmortales VI, he participated in the Copa Antonio Peña Royal Rumble, but was defeated by El Texano Jr. At Guerra de Titanes, Daga won a six-way Ladder match to win the AAA World Cruiserweight Championship. He retained the title for 623 days. At Rey De Reyes participated in a match for the recently created title AAA Fusion Championship, but he was defeated by Fénix. At Triplemanía XXI, Los Perros del Mal (Daga and Psicosis) tried to win the vacant AAA World Tag Team Championship, but they failed. At Héroes Inmortales VII he participated in a fatal four-way for the Copa Antonio Peña, but was defeated by El Hijo del Fantasma. At Rey de Reyes, Daga had his first AAA defense for the Cruiserweight title, defeating Argenis, Australian Suicide and Super Fly. At TripleMania XXII, Daga participated in a ten-man unification match between the Cruiserweight championship and the AAA Fusion Championship (held by Fenix), which was won by El Hijo del Fantasma. At Verano de Escándalo 2015, Daga participated in a ten-way match for the Alas de Oro ("Wings of Gold"). However, he was defeated by Drago. In 2015, Daga focused on the tag team division with various partners. At Héroes Inmortales IX, Daga and Steve Pain tried to win the AAA World Tag Team Championship from Los Perros del Mal (Pentagón Jr. and Joe Líder). However, the winners were Los Güeros del Cielo (Angélico and Jack Evans). On February 19, 2016, Los Perros del Mal (Daga and Taya Valkyrie) faced Pentagón Jr., one-half of the AAA World Mixed Tag Team Champions. However, Pentagon retained the title. Four days later, at Rey de Reyes, Los Perros del Mal (Daga and Joe Líder) faced the World Tag Team Champions Averno and Chessman and Argenis and Australian Suicide in a Tables, Ladders and Chairs match. However, the champions retained the titles. At Triplemanía XXIV, Daga participated in a 12-man battle royal for the Copa Triplemanía, but was the last man eliminated from the match as rival Australian Suicide won the Copa Triplemanía. At Héroes Inmortales X, Daga defeated Australian Suicide in a Lucha de Apuestas, hair vs mask match.

During a January 21, 2017, for The Crash promotion, Daga, Pentagón Jr. and Garza Jr. all came to the ring and later confirmed that they had left AAA only one day after all appearing at AAA's 2017 Guerra de Titanes show. As Daga had been using that name prior to joining AAA, he was also able to continue using it afterwards. The three hoped to able to use the Perros del Mal name on the independent circuit, but were unable to obtain the right and on January 24, Daga announced he was leaving the group. On January 27, 2017, Daga, Garza, Pentagon Jr. and Fénix el Rey announced the formation of a new stable named La Rebelión ("The Rebellion").

=== Independent circuit (2017–2019) ===
At the end of Season 3 of Lucha Underground, Daga was seen as part of Kobra Moon's Reptile Tribe. He made his return in June 2018, during the Aztec Warfare IV. On February 5, 2019, Major League Wrestling (MLW) revealed that Daga would start appearing for their company on a regular basis starting in March 2019. He had one previous match for the promotion, against Low Ki that took place in 2018. However, MLW released Daga in June.

=== Return to AAA (2019–2021) ===
On March 16 in Rey de Reyes, Daga returned to AAA after two years outside the company teaming up with Taya and Joe Líder as Los Perros del Mal where they fell defeated against El Nuevo Poder del Norte (Mocho Cota Jr., Carta Brava Jr. & Tito Santana) after leaving the team. On June 16 at Verano de Escandalo, Daga along with his girlfriend Tessa Blanchard were defeated by Laredo Kid and Taya. On July 6 in Zapopan, Daga had a chance for the AAA Latin American Championship against Drago, but fell disqualified after using the brass knuckles. On August 3 at Triplemanía XXVII, Daga participated in the Battle Royal for the Triplemanía Cup where he was eliminated and won by Pagano. At Héroes Inmortales XIII, Daga defeated Drago to win the title. Daga would vacated the title on April 24, 2021.

=== Impact Wrestling (2019–2020) ===
Daga made his debut for Impact on the February 1, 2019, episode of Impact Wrestling where Daga and The Latin American Xchange (Santana and Ortiz) lost to The Lucha Bros (Fénix and Pentagón Jr.) and Rey Horus in a six-man tag team match. At United We Stand, Team Lucha Underground (Daga, Aerostar, Drago and Marty The Moth Martínez) defeated Team Impact (Brian Cage, Eddie Edwards, Moose, and Tommy Dreamer). On the August 9 episode of Impact Wrestling, Daga and Ortiz representing LAX, lost to The North (Ethan Page and Josh Alexander) in a match for the Impact World Tag Team Championship. On the October 4 episode of Impact Wrestling, Daga defeated Chris Bey. During the COVID Pandemic in 2020, Olivo and his girlfriend Tessa Blanchard stayed in Mexico and didn't appear during the following months on Impact shows. On October 20, 2020, it was reported that he was released from his Impact contract, per his request.

=== Pro Wrestling Noah (2023–2026) ===
Daga made his debut in Noah on the first night of the Noah Star Navigation 2023 from February 5, where he teamed up with Eita, Nosawa Rongai, Chris Ridgeway and Yoshinari Ogawa to defeat Alejandro, Amakusa, Junta Miyawaki, Seiki Yoshioka and Yo-Hey. At Noah Majestic 2023 on May 4, he teamed up with Eita to face Chris Ridgeway and Yoshinari Ogawa in tag team action. During match, he betrayed Eita and joined Stinger in the process. On the fifth night of the Star Navigation from June 22, 2023, he teamed up with stablemate Ridgeway to defeat Good Looking Guys (Tadasuke and Yo-Hey), capturing the GHC Junior Heavyweight Tag Team Championship. They vacated the titles on September 5, after Ridgeway left NOAH. On September 24 at Grand Ship In Nagoya, Daga attacked Hayata after he successfully defended the GHC Junior Heavyweight Championship, before challenging him to a title match. On November 4 at Demolition Stage In Niigata, Daga defeated Hayata to become the new champion. He lost the title to Amakusa on July 13 at Destination, in his eight title defense, ending his reign at 251 days. On August 13, Stinger disbanded, after Ogawa retired due to a neck injury. On September 1, Daga defeated Amakusa to regain the GHC Junior Heavyweight Championship.

On January 1, 2025, at Noah The New Year 2025, Daga lost the Junior title to Eita in a 2 out of 3 Fall match.

On January 25, 2025, Omos handed his half of the GHC Tag Team Championship to Daga, after he announced that he would be leaving Noah to return to WWE. Subsequently, Daga announced a move to the heavyweight division. Two days later, the GHC committee announced that they do not honor Omos' transfer and the titles would be vacated instead.

On April 1st 2026, Daga faced his former tag team partner Daiki Odashima, Daga would defeat Odashima with a Brainbuster after a back and forth 15 minute long match. in Daga's final match in Noah. After the match, Daga told Daiki Odashima that he was ready to become a singles champion.

=== Second return to AAA (2026–present) ===
On the June 20, 2026, episode of Lucha Libre AAA, Daga returned to Lucha Libre AAA Worldwide to revive Los Perros del Mal with new members Berto, Angel, Bronco Nima and Karmen Petrovic. All members came to the ring and attacked El Grande Americano.

== Personal life ==
On November 20, 2019, Daga and Tessa Blanchard confirmed their engagement. The couple married in August 2020. They announced their separation on January 9, 2023.

== Championships and accomplishments ==
- DDT Pro-Wrestling
  - Ironman Heavymetalweight Championship (1 time)
- Lucha Libre AAA Worldwide
  - AAA World Cruiserweight Championship (1 time)
  - AAA Latin American Championship (1 time)
  - AAA World Trios Championship (1 time, current) – with Angel and Berto
  - AAA Quien Pinta Para La Corona (2011)
- International Wrestling League
  - IWL Internet Championship (1 time)
- Mucha Lucha Atlanta
  - MLA Global Championship (1 time)
- Lucha Underground
  - Lucha Underground Trios Championship (1 time) – with Kobra Moon and Jeremiah Snake
- Pro Wrestling Illustrated
  - Ranked No. 104 of the top 500 singles wrestlers in the PWI 500 in 2024
- Pro Wrestling Noah
  - GHC Junior Heavyweight Championship (2 times)
  - GHC Tag Team Championship (1 time) – with Jack Morris
  - GHC Junior Heavyweight Tag Team Championship (2 times) – with Chris Ridgeway (1) and Daiki Odashima (1)
- Xtreme Latin American Wrestling
  - X-LAW Junior Heavyweight Championship (1 time)

== Luchas de Apuestas record ==
Winner (wager)	Loser (wager)	Location	Event	Date	Notes
Daga (hair)	Eterno (hair)	Coacalco, State of Mexico	Live event	November 16, 2008	
Daga (hair)	Australian Suicide (mask)	Monterrey, Nuevo León	Héroes Inmortales X	October 2, 2016	
Daga (hair)	Nicho el Millonario (hair)	Tijuana, Baja California	The Crash show	June 23, 2017	(Note: Last two wrestlers in a steel cage match that also included Garza Jr. and Damián 666)
