= Blue Demon Jr. =

Mexican professional wrestler

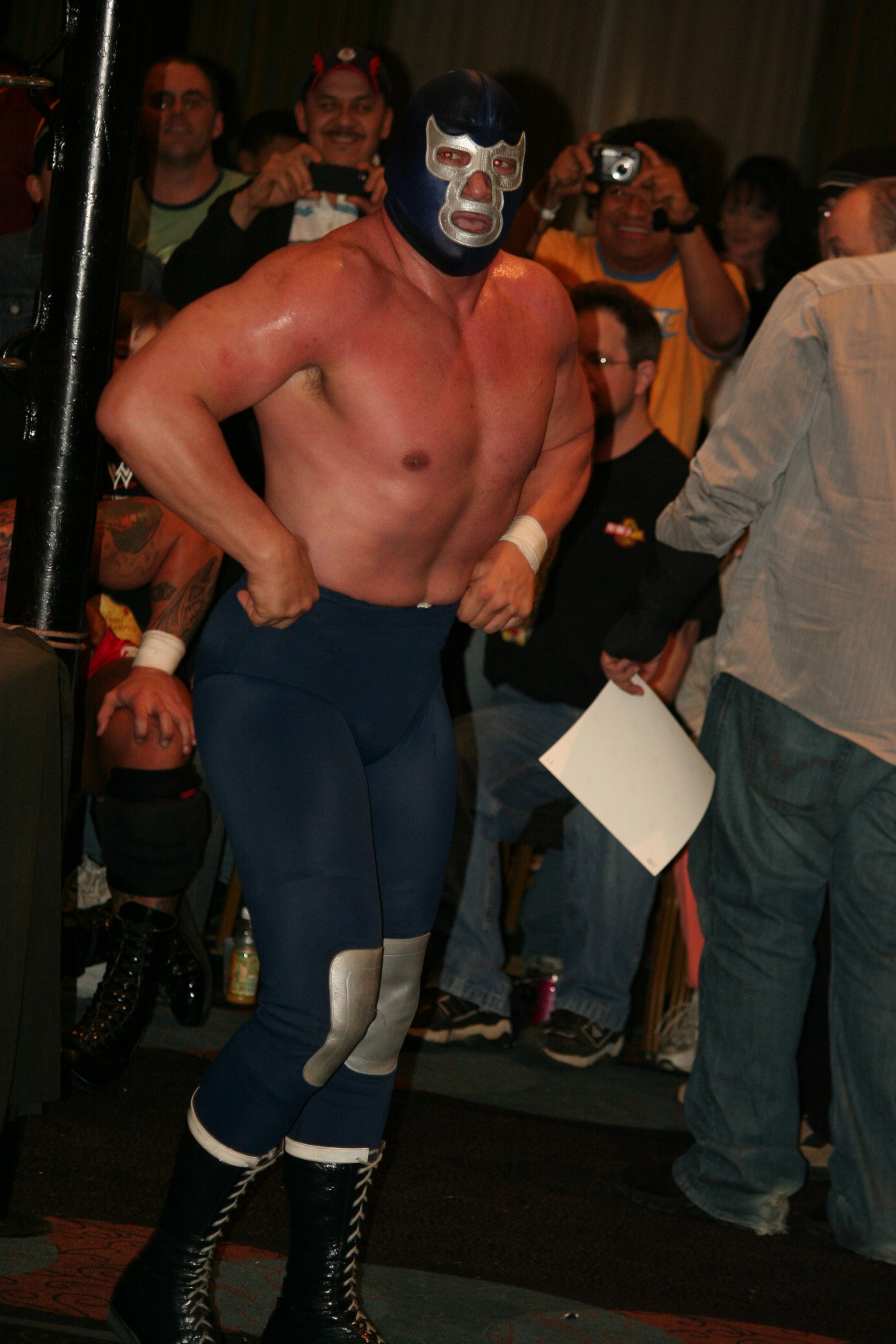
- Blue Demon in 2010

Personal information
- Born: July 19, 1966 (age 60) Mexico City, Mexico
- Family: Blue Demon (adoptive father)

Professional wrestling career
- Ring name: Blue Demon Jr.
- Billed height: 5 ft 9 in (1.75 m)
- Billed weight: 207 lb (94 kg)
- Billed from: Mexico City, Mexico
- Trained by: Blue Demon; Rolando Vera; Rafael Salamanca; Pepe Mendieta
- Debut: July 11, 1985

Blue Demon Jr. (born July 19, 1966) is a Mexican professional wrestler. He is the adopted son of the original Blue Demon and is the first Mexican and second masked wrestler to win the NWA World Heavyweight Championship thus making him a one-time world champion. His government name has never been officially disclosed to the public, as is often the case with masked wrestlers in Mexico where their on-stage personas are kept separate from their personal lives.

== Professional wrestling career ==
=== Lucha Libre AAA Worldwide (1996–2001) ===
In Lucha Libre AAA Worldwide (AAA) he formed the team Los Juniors with La Parka Jr., Mascara Sagrada Jr. and Perro Aguayo Jr. On April 18, 1999, in Zapopan, Jalisco they won the Mexican National Atómicos Championship by defeating Los Vatos Locos, a team of Charly Manson, May Flowers, Nygma and Picudo. On September 17, 1999, in Mexico City, D.F. they lost the championship to Los Vipers, a team of Histeria, Maniaco, Mosco de la Merced II and Psicosis II.

=== National Wrestling Alliance (2008–2010) ===
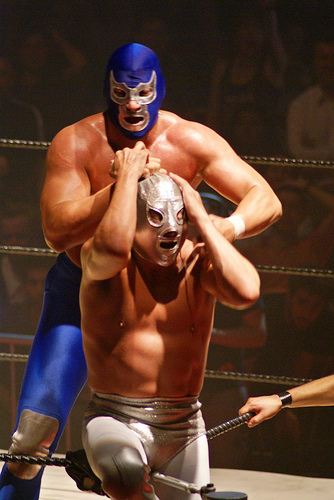
Blue Demon Jr. (behind, in blue costume) versus El Hijo del Santo

On October 25, 2008, Demon Jr. became the first Mexican professional wrestler, as well as first masked luchador to win the NWA World Heavyweight Championship when he defeated champion Adam Pearce. His win was also the first time the title changed hands in Mexico, although not with CMLL as would have been the case before the mid-1980s (It happened in Blue Demon Jr.'s own promotion: NWA Mexico). Pearce protested the loss with the NWA as his arm was under the bottom rope when he passed out from Blue Demon Jr's Single leg Boston crab. Blue Demon Jr. managed to hold on to the championship for 505 days before dropping it back to Pearce in a triple-threat match also involving Phill Shatter on March 14, 2010, at NWA New Beginnings.

=== Pro Wrestling Revolution (2010–2013) ===
Demon Jr. defeated Oliver John at an NWA Mexico event at the Lucha Libre Expo in Mexico City on July 23, 2010, to capture the Pro Wrestling Revolution (PWR) Heavyweight Championship. On May 11, 2013, El Hijo del Santo and his rival, Blue Demon Jr., joined forces to win the Pro Wrestling Revolution Tag Team Championship after defeating Brian Cage and Derek Sanders On September 6, 2012, Blue Demon Jr. lost the PWR World Heavyweight Championship to Carly Colón in a match that also involved La Parka II. On November 13, 2013, Blue Demon Jr. disbanded NWA Mexico and became officially affiliated with PWR.

=== Lucha Underground (2014–2015) ===
In August 2014, Blue Demon Jr. was announced as one of five AAA wrestlers to star in the El Rey network's new television series Lucha Underground. Blue Demon Jr. wrestled in the first match of the debut episode of Lucha Underground on October 29, defeating Chavo Guerrero Jr.

In the LU storyline, Blue Demon Jr. was hospitalized due to vicious after-match attacks by both Mil Muertes and Chavo Guerrero Jr. following Demon's loss to Mil Muertes in the November 5 main event match. Upon his return, he attacked Chavo and later in a face-to-face meeting with Chavo blocked another attack and emerged triumphant after laying Chavo out. On July 8, 2015, Demon turned rudo attacking Texano Jr.

=== Return to AAA (2013–present) ===
Blue Demon Jr. returned to AAA on March 3, 2013, challenging El Texano Jr. to a match for the AAA Mega Championship. The match took place on March 17 at Rey de Reyes and saw El Texano Jr. retain his title. After the match, Blue Demon Jr. challenged El Texano Jr. to a Mask vs. Hair Lucha de Apuestas. On April 15, Blue Demon Jr. announced that he had signed to become a regular member of AAA's roster. On June 16 at Triplemanía XXI, Blue Demon Jr. defeated El Mesías to win the vacant AAA Latin American Championship. He was stripped of the title on March 16, 2014, after he was unable to attend a scheduled title defense against Chessman at Rey de Reyes.

== In films and TV ==
In 2007, he appeared in the film Mil Mascaras vs. the Aztec Mummy (also known as Mil Mascaras Resurrection). In an episode of ¡Mucha Lucha!, a cartoon version of Blue Demon Jr. appears as a super hero wrestler. He competed on the Mexican dancing show Mira Quien Baila in 2011. He has a cameo in Mel Gibson's 2012 movie Get the Gringo. He also participated in Como dice el dicho in 2011.In 2014 the Blue Demon Jr. appears in the Misfit Garage episode titled "Wrestling with Disaster" in season 4, episode 3

In 2021, it was announced that Blue Demon Jr. would star in a new television series for Disney Channel titled Ultra Violet & Blue Demon. The series would have focused on Ultra Violet, played by Scarlett Estevez, who discovers that her uncle is Blue Demon Jr. and teams up with him to become superheroes. However, later that year, it was announced that the series would be retitled Ultra Violet & Black Scorpion with J. R. Villarreal replacing Blue Demon as an original character.

== Personal life ==
In 2009 it was announced that Blue Demon Jr.'s son was training for a career in professional wrestling.

== Championships and accomplishments ==
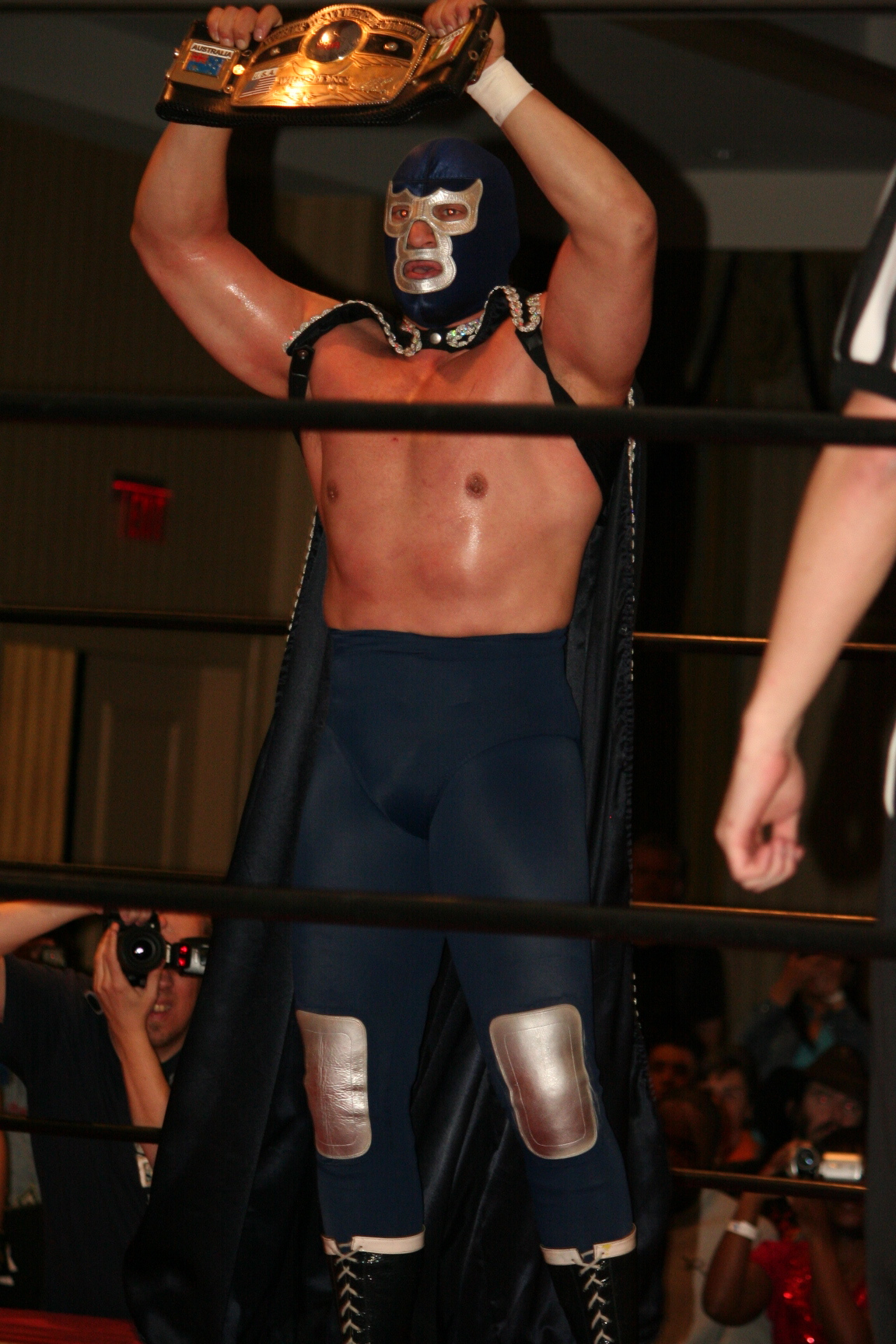
With the NWA World Heavyweight Championship title

- Cauliflower Alley Club
  - Lucha Libra Award (2018)
- International Wrestling All Stars
  - IWAS World Light Heavyweight Championship (1 time)
- Lucha Libre AAA Worldwide
  - AAA Latin American Championship (1 time)
  - Mexican National Atómicos Championship (1 time) - with La Parka Jr., Perro Aguayo Jr. and Máscara Sagrada Jr.
  - Mexican National Cruiserweight Championship (1 time)
  - Copa Hijo del Perro Aguayo (2019)
- NWA SOUTHWEST/World of Wrestling
  - WOW Heavyweight Championship (1 time)
- National Wrestling Alliance
  - NWA World Heavyweight Championship (1 time)
- Pro Wrestling Revolution
  - PWR Heavyweight Championship (2 times)
  - PWR Tag Team Championship (1 time) - with El Hijo del Santo
- Pro Wrestling Illustrated
  - Ranked No. 22 of the top 500 singles wrestlers in the PWI 500 in 2009
- Universal Wrestling Association
  - UWA World Junior Heavyweight Championship (1 time)
- World Wrestling Association
  - WWA Light Heavyweight Championship (1 time)
  - WWA Middleweight Championship (1 time)
  - WWA World Welterweight Championship (1 time)

== Luchas de Apuestas record ==
Winner (wager)	Loser (wager)	Location	Event	Date	Notes
Blue Demon Jr. (mask)	Invasor Galáctico (mask)	N/A	Live event	N/A	
Blue Demon Jr. (mask)	Vendaval (mask)	N/A	Live event	N/A	
Blue Demon Jr. (mask)	La Mancha (mask)	N/A	Live event	N/A	
Blue Demon Jr. (mask)	North Panther (mask)	N/A	Live event	N/A	
Blue Demon Jr. (mask)	Álex González (hair)	N/A	Live event	N/A	
Blue Demon Jr. (mask)	Black Panther (mask)	N/A	Live event	N/A	
Blue Demon Jr. (mask)	Black Killer (mask)	N/A	Live event	N/A	
Blue Demon Jr. (mask)	La Mosca (mask)	N/A	Live event	N/A	
Blue Demon Jr. (mask)	Scarlet (mask)	N/A	Live event	N/A	
Blue Demon Jr. (mask)	El Depredador (mask)	Tijuana, Baja California	Live event	N/A	
Blue Demon Jr. (mask)	Síndrome (mask)	N/A	Live event	N/A	
Blue Demon Jr. (mask)	Máquina Salvaje (mask)	N/A	Live event	1989	
Blue Demon Jr. (mask)	MS-Jr. (mask)	Mexico City	Live event	November 24, 1994	
Blue Demon Jr. (mask)	Gran Sheik (mask)	Mexico City	Live event	1995	
Blue Demon Jr. (mask)	El Jorobado (mask)	Xico, Veracruz	Live event	January 1, 1999	
Blue Demon Jr. (mask)	Black Demon (mask)	Tijuana, Baja California	Live event	October 1, 1999	
Blue Demon Jr. (mask)	Black Führer (mask)	Guadalajara, Jalisco	Live event	2002	
Blue Demon Jr. (mask)	Espectro Jr. (mask)	Tijuana, Baja California	Live event	October 7, 2007	
Blue Demon Jr. (mask)	Rey Wagner (hair)	Mexico City	Triplemanía XXVII	August 3, 2019	
