= Crazy Boy =

Mexican professional wrestler

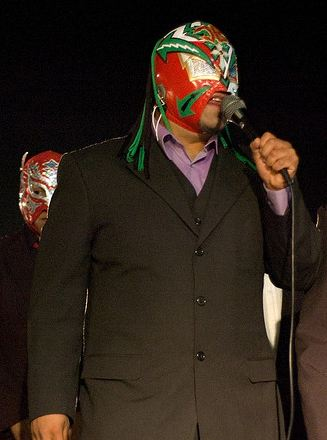
- Crazy Boy during a press conference

Personal information
- Born: March 30, 1978 (age 48) Tulancingo, Hidalgo

Professional wrestling career
- Ring name: Crazy Boy
- Billed height: 1.75 m (5 ft 9 in)
- Billed weight: 86 kg (190 lb)
- Trained by: Rey Cuervo; Super Crazy; Sabu; Masato Tanaka
- Debut: 1997

Crazy Boy (born March 30, 1978) is a Mexican professional wrestler who works for promotion Lucha Libre AAA Worldwide (AAA). Crazy Boy is the first cousin of Super Crazy, former ECW and WWE wrestler. A masked wrestler, Crazy Boy's real name is not a matter of public record, as is often the case with masked wrestlers in Mexico where their private lives are kept a secret from the wrestling fans. In addition to being Super Crazy's first cousin, he is uncle of fellow masked wrestlers Dinastía and Lanzeloth.

== Biography ==
=== International Wrestling Revolution Group (1997-2006) ===
Around the turn of the millennium, Crazy Boy worked extensively in Naucalpan, Mexico State, for the then recently created International Wrestling Revolution Group (IWRG). In IWRG he formed a "suicidal" trio with Star Boy and Súper Boy who all used a high flying, high risk wrestling style.

=== Consejo Mundial De Lucha Libre (2006) ===
Crazy Boy's stint in CMLL ended in a messy way, with Crazy pulling himself out from an Arena Mexico show (which would have been his first CMLL one there), claiming an injury from a just completed Japanese tour, only to show up as a surprise days later.

=== Asistencia Asesoria y Adminitracion (2007–Present) ===
He won the AAA promoted "Campeonato National de Atomico" (4 man tag team championship), along with Juventud Guerrera, Joe Líder and Psicosis II. After Psicosis II's betrayal costing the Mexican Powers' their titles, Extreme Tiger was brought in as a replacement. Tiger has left the group since to join Halloween's new group, as it remains Crazy Boy, Joe Líder, and Juventud Guerrera. Along with Joe Líder and Juventud Guerrera, the group traveled to Japan to compete in Pro Wrestling Noah's TripleSEM, where they were victorious. Crazy Boy and Joe Líder thought still remain AAA World Tag Team Championship.

Joe Líder broke off his connection to Mexican Powers, losing his and Crazy Boy's AAA World Tag Team Championship to the Halloween and Extreme Tiger. After Líder's leave, Crazy Boy, Juventud Guerrera, and Ultimo Gladiador continued as the Mexican Powers, while Líder formed a new group with Psicosis. When Juventud departed, Crazy Boy and Ultimo Gladiador continued to compete as a two-man tag team. Some months after Dr. Wagner Jr. joined AAA, Ultimo Gladiador became a part of the Wagnermaniacos faction, leaving Crazy Boy on his own.

Crazy Boy returned to AAA in 2013 to reform Mexican Powers with Joe Líder. On June 16 at Triplemanía XXI, the two won a five-way match for the vacant AAA World Tag Team Championship.

=== Desastre Total Ultraviolento (2004–Present) ===
In 2004, Crazy Boy founded his own wrestling organization, Desastre Total Ultraviolento. On September 27, 2007, he teamed with El Generico to defeat Zema Ion and Extreme Tiger. On November 16, 2007, Crazy Boy defeated Zema Ion and Extreme Tiger in a three-way Light Tube match.

== Championships and accomplishments ==
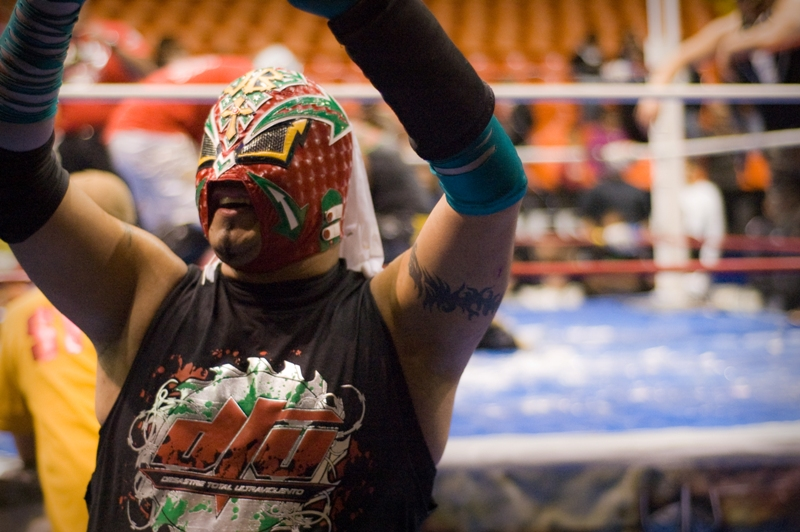
Crazy Boy during a DTU event

- Lucha Libre AAA Worldwide
  - AAA World Tag Team Championship (2 times) – with Joe Líder
  - Mexican National Atómicos Championship (1 time) – with Juventud Guerrera, Joe Líder and Psicosis II
- Xtreme Latin American Wrestling
  - XLAW Extreme Junior Heavyweight Championship (1 time)
- Other titles
  - NWG Extreme Championship (1 time)

== Luchas de Apuestas record ==
Winner (wager)	Loser (wager)	Location	Event	Date	Notes
Crazy Boy (mask)	Poder Gitano (mask)	N/A	Live event	N/A	
Crazy Boy (mask)	Genesis (mask)	N/A	Live event	N/A	
Crazy Boy (mask)	Pirata Morgan Jr. (hair)	Tulancingo, Hidalgo	Live event	December 16, 2001	(Note: This was a triangle match that also included Brazo de Plata, Jr.)
Crazy Boy (mask)	Katsumi Kanai (hair)	Tulancingo, Hidalgo	Live event	May 5, 2002	
Crazy Boy (mask)	Pirata Morgan Jr. (hair)	Tulancingo, Hidalgo	Live event	June 8, 2003	
Crazy Boy (mask)	Dakota (hair)	Reynosa, Tamaulipas	Live event	September 21, 2004	
Psicosis II and Crazy Boy (masks)	Perversos de Panama I and II (masks)	Torreón, Coahuila	Live event	September 1, 2006	(Note: This was a triangle tag team match that also included Dralion and Nightmare.)
Crazy Boy (mask)	El Caballero Maravilla (mask)	Zacatecas, Mexico	house show	November 18, 2010	(Note: Last two men in a ten-man steel cage match that also included El Alebrije, Chapulin, Cibernético, El Elegido, Gronda II, Histeria, Rafaga, and Tinieblas Jr.)
Crazy Boy (mask)	Chamacho Becerra (hair)	Matamoros, Tamaulipas, Mexico	PNX show	April 30, 2011	
Crazy Boy (mask)	Diturbio (Note: Not Disturbio) (hair)	Tamaulipas, Mexico	DTU show	August 2, 2019	
