= Legend Quest =

Legend Quest may refer to:

- Legend Quest (2011 TV series)
- Legend Quest (2017 TV series)
- LegendQuest, a tabletop role-playing game published in 1991
