= John Morrison (wrestler) =

American professional wrestler (born 1979)

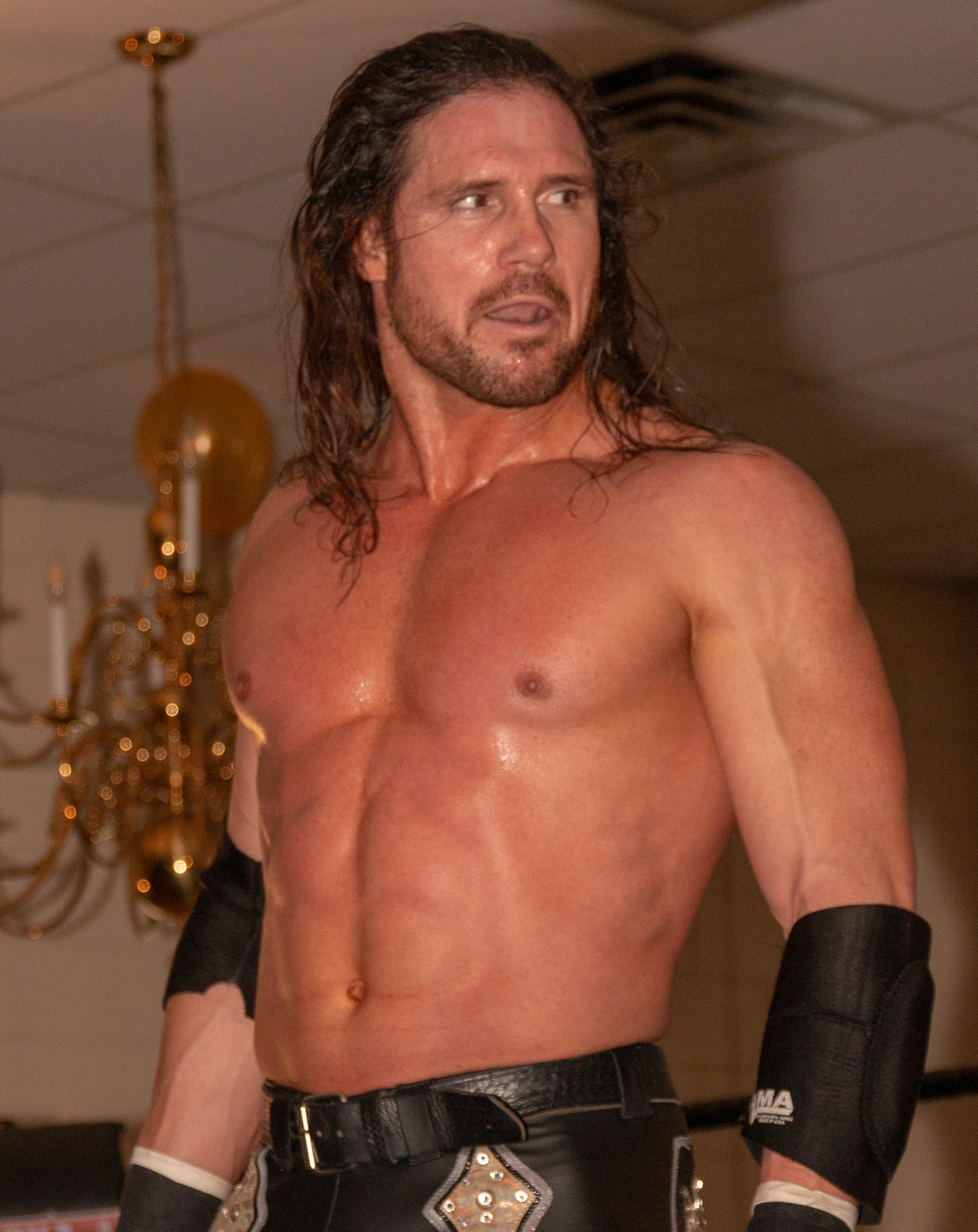
- Morrison in 2019

Personal information
- Born: John Randall Hennigan; October 3, 1979 (age 47) Los Angeles, California, U.S.
- Education: University of California, Davis
- Spouse: Taya Valkyrie (m. 2018)
- Life partner: Melina Perez (2003–2015)

Professional wrestling career
- Ring name: See below
- Billed height: 6 ft 0 in (1.83 m)
- Billed weight: 215 lb (98 kg)
- Billed from: Los Angeles, California; Slamtown, USA
- Trained by: Supreme Pro Wrestling; Al Snow; Bill DeMott; Ivory; Ohio Valley Wrestling
- Debut: June 19, 2002

John Randall Hennigan (born October 3, 1979), better known by his ring name John Morrison, is an American professional wrestler and actor. He is signed to All Elite Wrestling (AEW), where he performs under the ring name Johnny TV and is a member of MxM TV. He also performs for their sister promotion Ring of Honor (ROH) and also performs on the independent circuit under various ring names. Hennigan is best known for his tenures in WWE from 2002 to 2011 and again from 2019 to 2021, as well as Impact Wrestling, Lucha Underground and Lucha Libre AAA Worldwide (AAA).

After winning Tough Enough III (a WWE reality TV competition show that awarded winners a wrestling contract with the company), Hennigan was assigned to its developmental territory, Ohio Valley Wrestling. WWE promoted Hennigan to its SmackDown! roster in April 2005 under the ring name Johnny Nitro; winning the WWE Tag Team Championship with Joey Mercury in his first match on the show. After departing from the company in 2011, he held main event roles in several promotions outside of WWE, including Impact Wrestling, Lucha Libre AAA Worldwide and Lucha Underground. Outside of WWE, he has used several different ring names, including Johnny Impact in Impact Wrestling and Johnny Mundo in various Mexican promotions.

Hennigan has won the ECW World Heavyweight Championship, AAA Mega Championship, Impact World Championship, and Lucha Underground Championship once each. In WWE, he also held the Intercontinental Championship three times, and was a six-time tag team champion. In lucha libre, Hennigan was a central fixture in all four seasons of Lucha Underground, and was AAA's first-ever triple champion, holding the AAA Mega Championship, AAA Latin American Championship, and AAA World Cruiserweight Championship simultaneously. He has headlined multiple major events for WWE and Impact, including the latter company's flagship event, Bound for Glory, in 2017 and 2018.

Outside of wrestling, Hennigan has also worked in the film and television industry. In film, he has mainly worked as an actor, producer and stuntman. He also competed as a contestant on the 37th season of the competitive reality show Survivor.

== Early life ==
John Randall Hennigan was born on October 3, 1979, in Los Angeles, California, and grew up in Palos Verdes Peninsula, where he attended Palos Verdes Peninsula High School. He graduated from the University of California, Davis in 2002, where he studied film and geology.

== Professional wrestling career ==
=== World Wrestling Federation/Entertainment/WWE (2002–2011) ===
==== Tough Enough and Ohio Valley Wrestling (2002–2004) ====
After graduating college with a degree in film and geology and deciding that he did not want to pursue either path, Hennigan began his professional wrestling career training at the Supreme Pro Wrestling school in Sacramento, California. After failing his audition for Tough Enough 2, a competition in which the winner earned a World Wrestling Federation (WWF) contract, he was accepted as a cast member for Tough Enough III in 2002, eventually becoming the co-winner with Matt Cappotelli. For winning, Hennigan was awarded a developmental contract and assigned to their developmental territory, Ohio Valley Wrestling (OVW), to continue his training. Hennigan competed in Acolytes Protection Agency's invitational Bar Room Brawl match on July 27, 2003, at Vengeance. Hennigan and Cappotelli made an appearance on an episode of Heat in January 2004, losing to Garrison Cade and Mark Jindrak. In March, Hennigan, going by the ring name "Johnny Superstar", turned on Cappotelli, establishing himself as a heel.

==== Eric Bischoff's assistant and MNM (2004–2006) ====
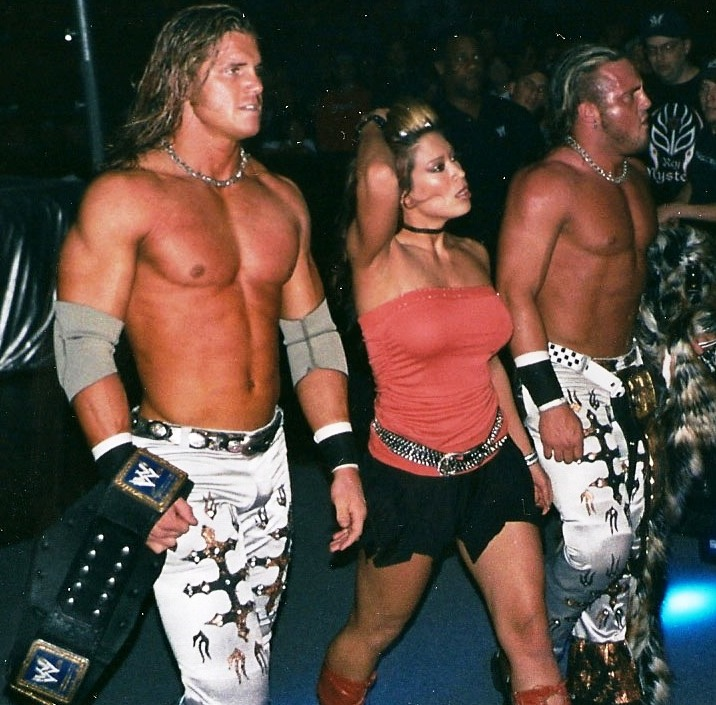
Nitro (left) won three WWE Tag Team Championships with Joey Mercury (right) in 2005 and 2006.

On the March 1 episode of Raw, Hennigan debuted on the main roster as a heel under the ring name "Johnny Blaze". His gimmick was that he was the apprentice and assistant of the Raw General Manager, Eric Bischoff. The next week his name was changed to "Johnny Spade", and three weeks after that it was changed to "Johnny Nitro". The Nitro name, which finally stuck, was a reference to WCW Monday Nitro, the flagship show of World Championship Wrestling (WCW) for which Bischoff had previously worked, using the Nitro theme as his ring entrance music. Nitro acted as Bischoff's apprentice and assistant until June, when he was sent back to OVW. To explain his departure, Nitro lost a match on the June 7 episode of Raw against Eugene, which carried the stipulation that upon his loss.

Upon his return to OVW, Nitro was put into a feud with Matt Cappotelli. During the course of the feud, Melina was brought into the company as Nitro's ex-girlfriend and an ally of Cappotelli, only to turn on him and side with Nitro. Not long after, Nitro and Melina were joined by Joey Mercury, forming the stable MNM. MNM wrestled in OVW for around a year, holding the OVW Southern Tag Team Championship once, before losing the titles to Cappotelli and Johnny Jeter in January 2005. They were soon called up to the main SmackDown! brand in April that same year.

In their debut match on the main roster, MNM won the WWE Tag Team Championship from Eddie Guerrero and Rey Mysterio on the April 21 episode of SmackDown!. MNM held the titles for three months, having successful defenses against the teams of Guerrero and Mysterio, and Charlie Haas and Hardcore Holly on May 22 at Judgment Day, before dropping them to the Legion of Doom on July 24 at The Great American Bash. They won the titles again on the October 28 episode of SmackDown! in a four-way match defeating Legion of Doom, The Mexicools, and William Regal and Paul Burchill, but lost them to Rey Mysterio and Batista on the December 16 episode of SmackDown! two days before Armageddon. Due to help from Mark Henry, MNM defeated Mysterio and Batista in a rematch on the December 30 episode of SmackDown! to win the championship for the third time. They began a rivalry with the team of Paul London and Brian Kendrick that lasted over three months, until they dropped the championship to London and Kendrick at Judgment Day on May 21, 2006, with the storyline leading to Nitro and Melina suddenly turning on Mercury after the match, breaking up the group. Melina and Nitro left the SmackDown! brand by losing their jobs in kayfabe.

==== Singles competition and championship success (2006–2007) ====
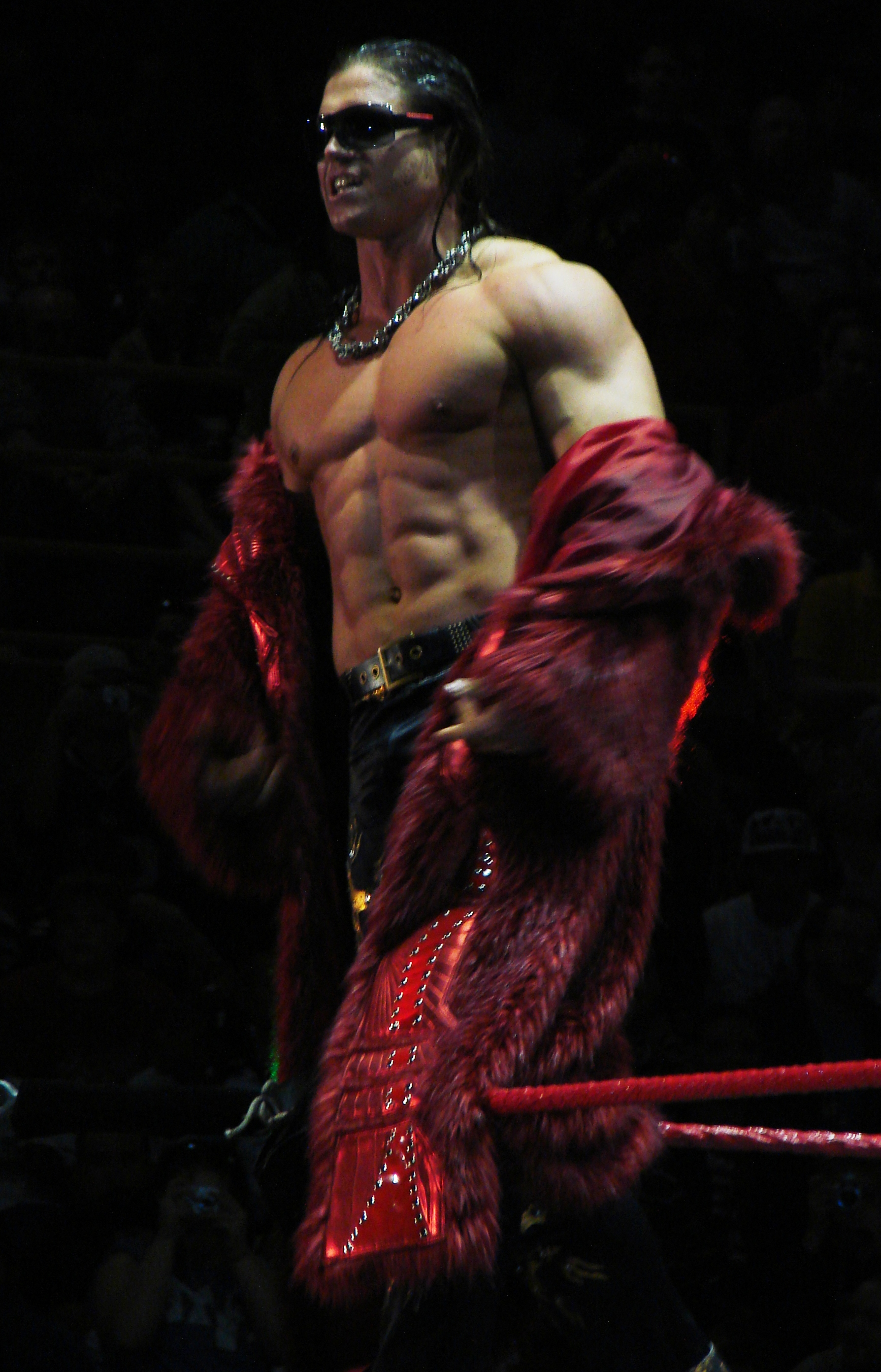
After MNM's split, Nitro achieved success as a singles competitor, winning two Intercontinental Championships and the ECW World Heavyweight Championship

The next week, Nitro, along with Melina, debuted on the Raw brand in a loss to WWE Champion John Cena. Nitro was immediately placed in the Intercontinental Championship picture, and at Vengeance on June 25, he defeated champion Shelton Benjamin in a triple threat match also involving Carlito to win the title. Nitro held the championship for four months, retaining against Jeff Hardy on September 17 at Unforgiven, before losing the title back to Hardy on the October 2 episode of Raw. Nitro recaptured the Intercontinental Championship from Hardy on the November 6 episode of Raw, but lost it back to Hardy on the following week's Raw. Also around this time, Nitro entered into a partnership with rapper Kevin Federline, with the duo antagonizing and beginning a rivalry with WWE Champion John Cena. Federline was then, in storyline, trained by Nitro for a match with Cena, which he won after interference from Umaga.

MNM reunited on the November 27 episode of Raw to accept an open challenge from The Hardys (Jeff Hardy and Matt Hardy) at December to Dismember on December 3, a match that they lost. MNM and The Hardys feuded across the brands throughout the month, with the two teams competing in a four-way ladder match for the WWE Tag Team Championship at Armageddon on December 17 also involving Brian Kendrick and Paul London and Dave Taylor and William Regal, which MNM failed to win. Nitro challenged Jeff Hardy for the Intercontinental Championship in a steel cage match at New Year's Revolution on January 7, 2007, but lost. MNM lost to The Hardys at the Royal Rumble on January 28, and again at No Way Out on February 18, which ended the feud. MNM disbanded as a team when Mercury was released from WWE in March 2007.

After Mercury's departure, Nitro also ended his association with Melina. Nitro was placed in a tag team with Kenny Dykstra, until the 2007 WWE draft, during which Nitro was drafted to the ECW brand. Nitro made his debut for the brand on the June 19 episode of ECW, with a win over Nunzio, and few days later, on June 24, at Vengeance: Night of Champions, he won the vacant ECW World Heavyweight Championship by defeating CM Punk, replacing the absent Chris Benoit due to the latter's double-murder suicide. A few weeks after winning the title, Nitro was repackaged as John Morrison, a reference to musician Jim Morrison, to whom Hennigan bears a strong physical resemblance. Morrison retained the title against Punk at The Great American Bash on July 22, and on August 26 at SummerSlam. Punk would again challenge for the championship on the September 4 episode of ECW, in which Morrison lost the championship to Punk, ending his reign at 69 days. Morrison was then suspended for thirty days for violating WWE's Wellness Program, renewing his feud with Punk upon his return, as well as competing against The Miz for the number one contendership to the title.

==== Teaming with The Miz (2007–2009) ====
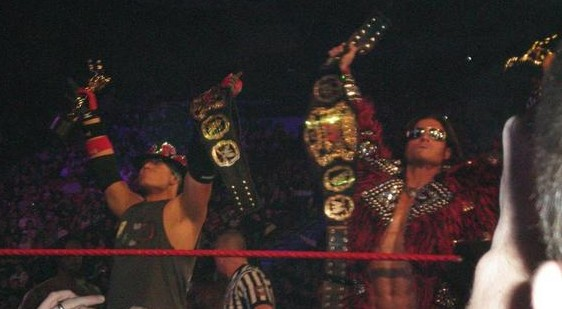
From 2007 to 2009, Morrison teamed with The Miz, winning the WWE Tag Team Championship and World Tag Team Championship.

Though rivals, Morrison and The Miz faced the dysfunctional tag team of Matt Hardy and Montel Vontavious Porter (MVP) on the November 16 episode of SmackDown! for the WWE Tag Team Championship in a winning effort, marking Morrison's fourth WWE Tag Team Championship reign. At Survivor Series two days later, Morrison and The Miz were both defeated by CM Punk in a triple threat match for the ECW Championship. After the defeat, the rivalry aspect of Morrison and The Miz's relationship faded, as they were now portrayed as trusting friends. Morrison competed in the 2008 Royal Rumble match on January 27, but failed to win after being eliminated by Kane. In February 2008, Morrison and The Miz were given a streaming segment on WWE.com named The Dirt Sheet in which they mocked other wrestlers and facets of pop culture. Morrison and The Miz co-wrote each episode of The Dirt Sheet each week, and Morrison credits his time in college studying film with contributing to the success of the show. On March 30 at WrestleMania XXIV, Morrison competed in the Money in the Bank ladder match, which was won by CM Punk. Despite being unsuccessful, Morrison had a standout performance in the match, in which he performed a moonsault from the top rope to the outside of the ring while holding onto a ladder.

Morrison and The Miz retained the titles against Kane and CM Punk at Judgment Day on May 18 and Finlay and Hornswoggle at Night of Champions on June 29, before dropping the titles to Curt Hawkins and Zack Ryder on July 20 at The Great American Bash in a fatal four-way match which also featured Jesse and Festus. Neither Morrison nor The Miz were pinned, as Hawkins pinned Jesse to win the titles. Afterwards, they started a feud with Cryme Tyme (JTG and Shad) through each team's Internet show, which then transitioned to matches on Raw and on October 26 at Cyber Sunday. After winning the Slammy Award for Best WWE.com exclusive earlier in the day, Morrison and The Miz won the "Tag Team of the Year" Slammy Award on December 8, 2008 episode of Raw. On December 13, Morrison and The Miz won the World Tag Team Championship from CM Punk and Kofi Kingston at a live event.

Morrison and The Miz engaged themselves in a feud with The Colóns (Carlito and Primo), who were the reigning WWE Tag Team Champions, which resulted in both teams defending their respective championships successfully in separate matches. Their feud culminated in a tag team lumberjack match where both titles were on the line at the WrestleMania 25, but it was The Colóns who would unify the championships with a win. On April 13, as part of the 2009 WWE Draft, The Miz was drafted to the Raw brand to split up the team, and as a result, The Miz attacked Morrison.

==== Intercontinental Champion (2009–2010) ====
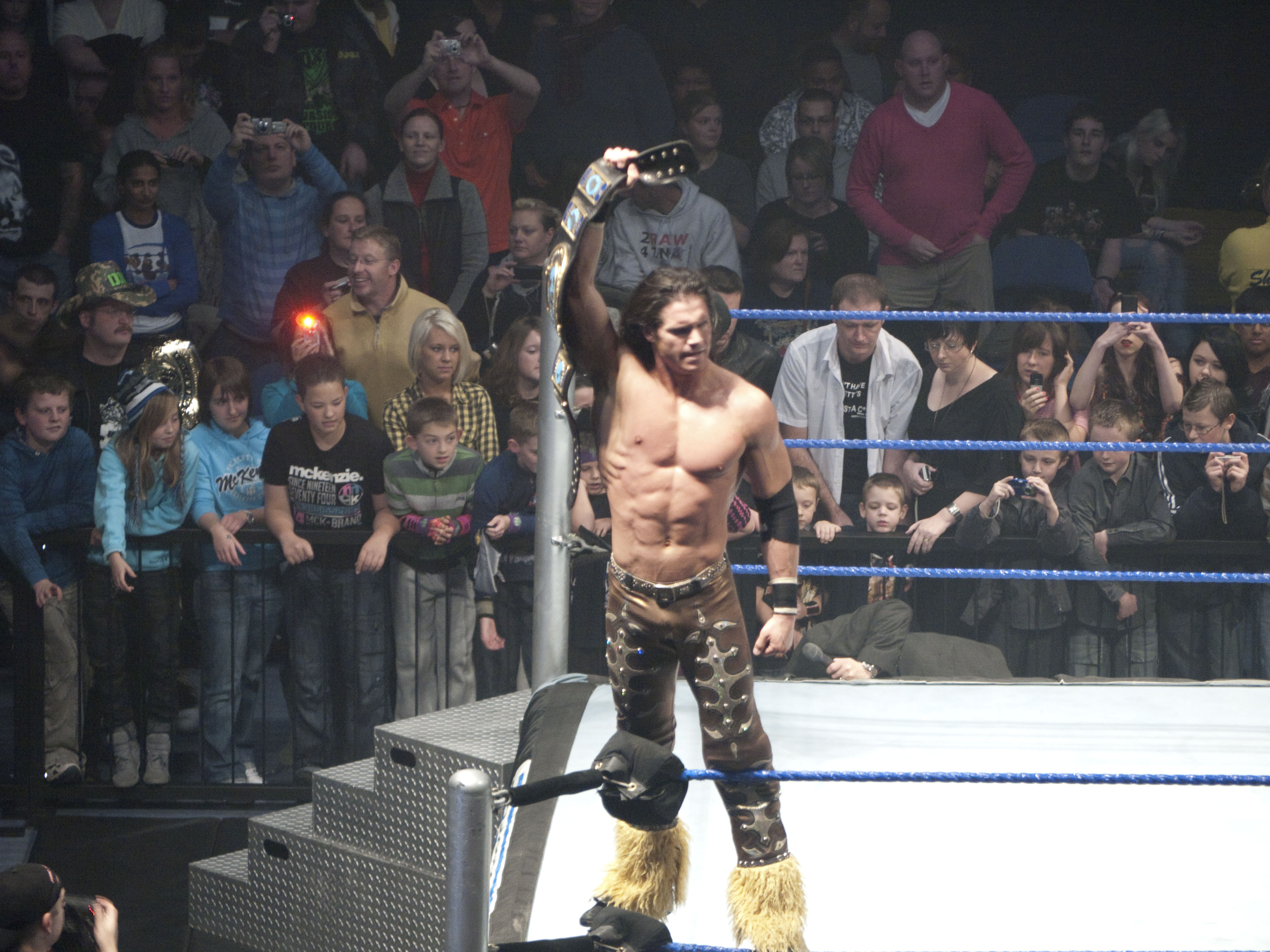
After Morrison was separated from The Miz and drafted to SmackDown, he won his third Intercontinental Championship.

On April 15, Morrison was drafted to the SmackDown brand as part of the 2009 Supplemental Draft. On the April 17 episode of SmackDown, he defeated R-Truth. On the May 1 episode of SmackDown, Morrison engaged in a backstage fight with Chris Jericho after Jericho slapped him, turning face in the process for the first time in his career. Later that same night, Morrison defeated Shelton Benjamin, beginning a feud between the two. On the May 7 episode of Superstars, Morrison lost a match to Jericho after a distraction by Benjamin. Morrison continued to score victories over Benjamin in singles and tag team matches before defeating him on May 17 at Judgment Day.

On the September 4 episode of SmackDown, Morrison defeated Rey Mysterio to win his third Intercontinental Championship. Morrison then began a feud with Dolph Ziggler, retaining the title against Ziggler on October 4 at Hell in a Cell, and again on the following episode of SmackDown. The feud between Morrison and Ziggler continued throughout the next month, with the two wrestling to a double countout for the Intercontinental Championship on the November 13 episode of SmackDown and Morrison retaining the championship in a two-out-of-three falls match the following week to end the feud. At Bragging Rights on October 25, Morrison lost to his former tag team partner then-United States Champion The Miz in an interbrand Champion vs. Champion match. Their rivalry continued after both were announced as opposing team captains for Survivor Series on November 22, where Miz's team defeated Morrison's team. Morrison then went on to feud with newcomer Drew McIntyre, who defeated Morrison in a non-title match on the December 4 episode of SmackDown, thus earning a championship opportunity against Morrison. At TLC: Tables, Ladders & Chairs on December 13, Morrison lost the Intercontinental Championship to McIntyre, ending his reign at 103 days. Morrison later won an Elimination Chamber qualifying match and participated in the Elimination Chamber match for the World Heavyweight Championship on February 21, 2010, but was eliminated by The Undertaker. On the March 5 episode of SmackDown, Morrison teamed with R-Truth to defeat Cryme Tyme and The Hart Dynasty to earn a Unified WWE Tag Team Championship match against ShoMiz (Big Show and The Miz). At WrestleMania XXVI on March 28, they failed to win the championship.

==== Championship pursuits (2010–2011) ====
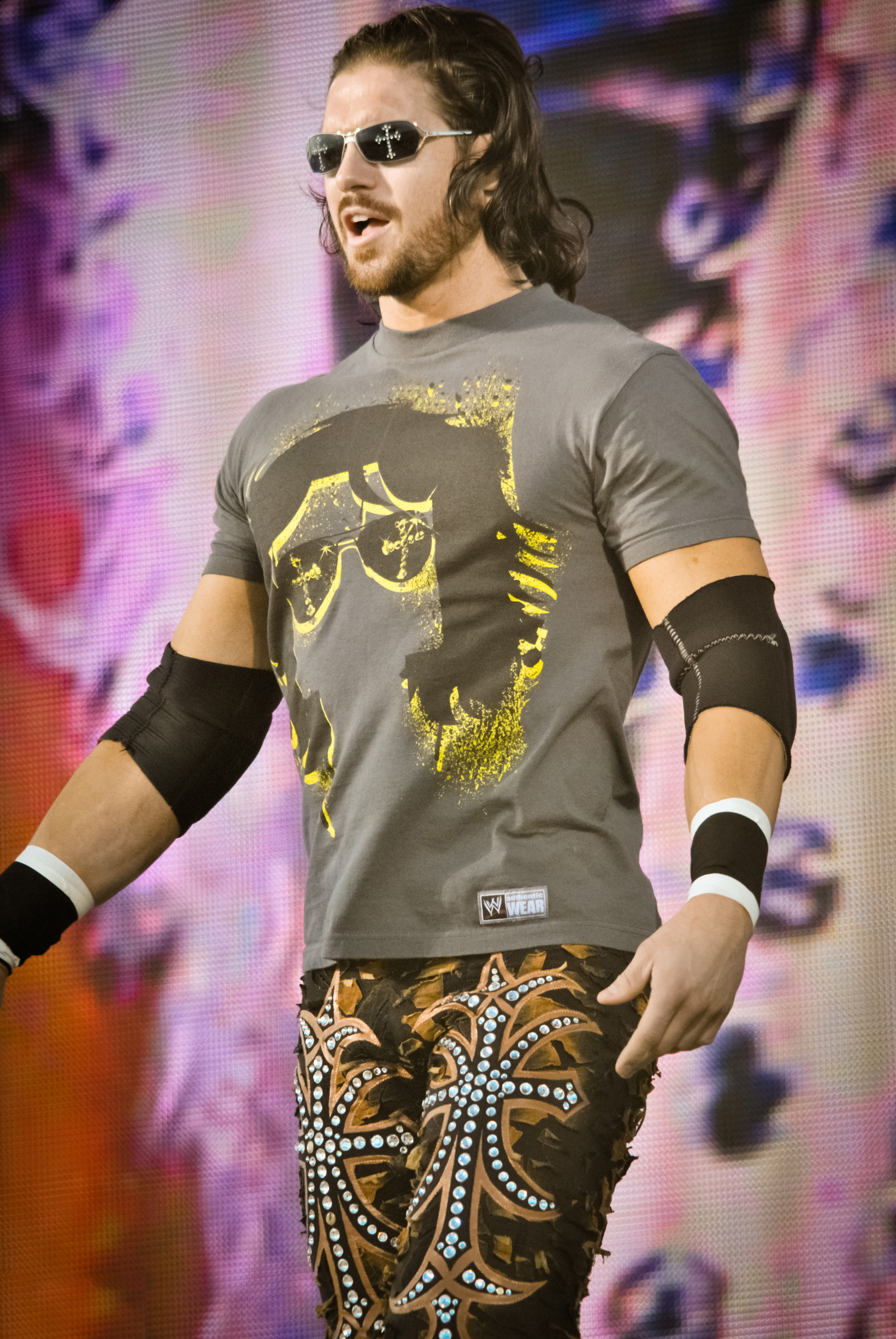
Morrison at WWE Tribute to the Troops in December 2010

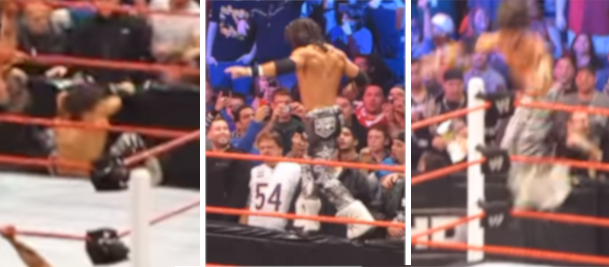
Morrison's highly acclaimed spot in the Royal Rumble match

On April 26, Morrison was drafted to the Raw brand as part of the 2010 WWE draft, and lost his first match back for the brand later that night to Jack Swagger. In his final match on SmackDown, he lost to Cody Rhodes. On June 1, Morrison announced that he would be mentoring Eli Cottonwood in the second season of NXT. Cottonwood, however, was the second person eliminated from the competition, and was eliminated on the July 27 episode of NXT. Morrison then went on to participate in the main event of SummerSlam on August 15, in which he and six teammates (John Cena, Edge, Chris Jericho, Bret Hart, R-Truth, and Daniel Bryan) were victorious in a seven-on-seven elimination tag team match against The Nexus. In October, Morrison began a feud with Sheamus after he helped Santino Marella earn an upset win during a one-sided match against Sheamus. Within the following weeks, Morrison continued to save Marella from attacks by Sheamus. At Survivor Series on November 21, Morrison defeated Sheamus. Morrison entered the 2010 edition of the King of the Ring tournament, defeating Tyson Kidd, Cody Rhodes, and Alberto Del Rio but lost to Sheamus in the final round. He continued to feud with Sheamus and defeated him in a WWE Championship number one contender's ladder match at Tables, Ladders & Chairs on December 19. Morrison received his WWE Championship match on the January 3, 2011 episode of Raw, but lost to reigning champion The Miz in a falls count anywhere match. Morrison participated in the Royal Rumble match at Royal Rumble on January 30, 2011 and despite not winning, he had a stand-out moment which was praised by critics as "arguably the spot of the decade" when Morrison was knocked off of the ring apron and performed a cat leap onto the barricade to avoid having his feet touch the floor and then went on to precision jump onto the ring steps and re-enter the ring. On February 20, Morrison participated in the Elimination Chamber match at Elimination Chamber, but was eliminated by CM Punk. During the match, Morrison climbed to the top of the cage while inside the cage before dropping to deliver a crossbody on and eliminate Sheamus. At WrestleMania XXVII on April 3, Morrison, Trish Stratus and Jersey Shore guest star Snooki defeated Dolph Ziggler and LayCool (Layla and Michelle McCool) in a mixed tag team match.

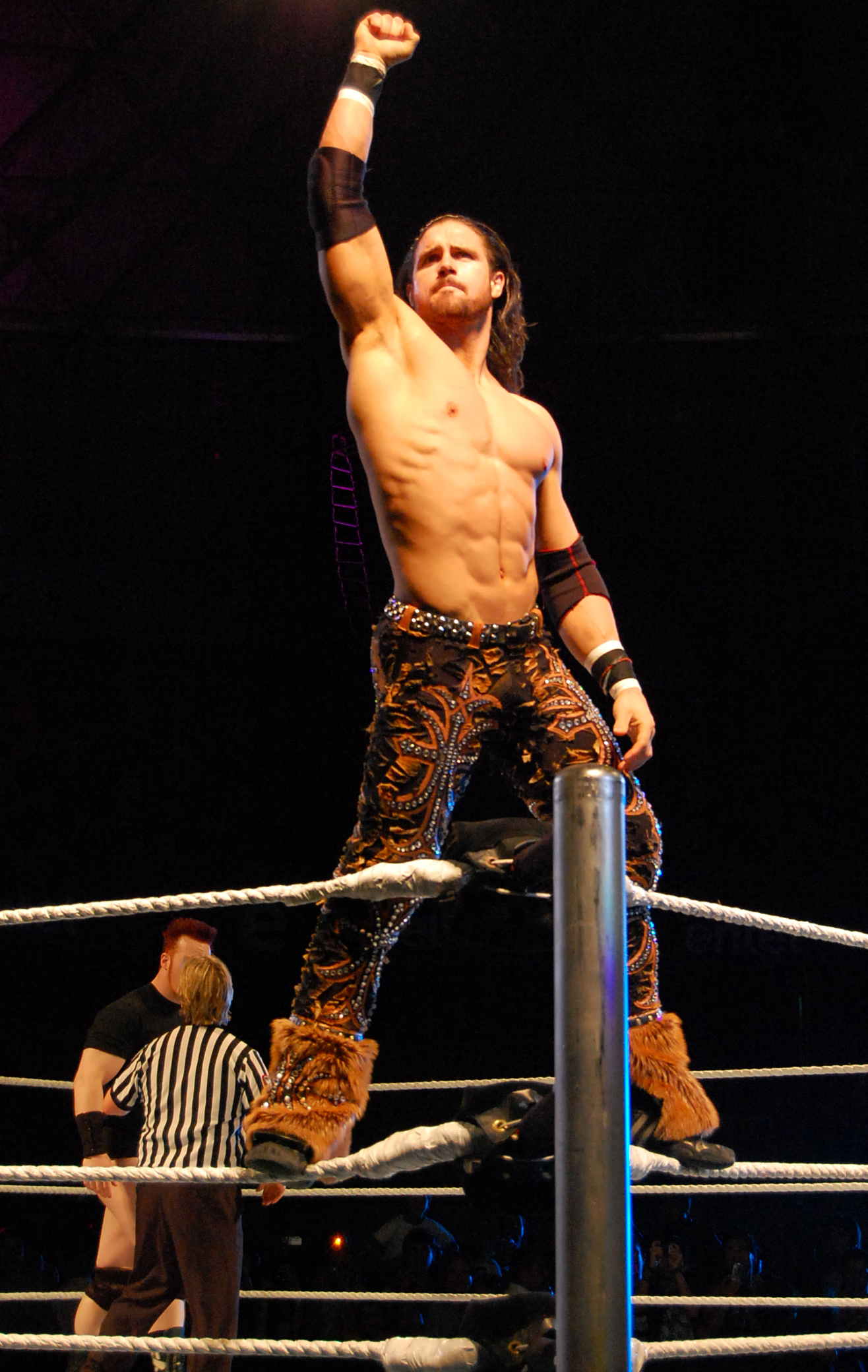
Morrison participated in feuds for various championships before departing from WWE in 2011.

On the April 11 episode of Raw, Morrison participated in a five-man gauntlet match for the #1 contender's spot for the WWE Championship, but was eliminated by R-Truth. The next week on Raw, Morrison challenged R-Truth to a match with the stipulation that if Morrison won, he would take R-Truth's place in the steel cage match at Extreme Rules. R-Truth accepted and lost the match, making Morrison the new #1 contender. After the match, R-Truth viciously attacked Morrison. At Extreme Rules on May 1, R-Truth interfered in the WWE Championship steel cage match, attacking Morrison to prevent him from winning the match. The next night on Raw, Morrison was attacked by R-Truth again, prior to a scheduled match between the two which did not happen as a result. Morrison then underwent surgery to correct a legitimately pinched nerve in his neck. Morrison initially returned on the June 13 episode of Raw, but R-Truth attacked him again prior to their scheduled match, re-injuring him. Morrison returned again on the July 25 episode of Raw, attacking R-Truth. At SummerSlam on August 14, Morrison, Kofi Kingston and Rey Mysterio defeated R-Truth, Alberto Del Rio and The Miz. The following night on Raw, Morrison defeated R-Truth in a falls count anywhere match to end their feud. At Night of Champions on September 18, Morrison competed in a fatal four-way match for the United States Championship, also involving Alex Riley, Dolph Ziggler, and Jack Swagger, with Ziggler retaining his title. Morrison then challenged Cody Rhodes for the Intercontinental Championship at Hell in a Cell on October 2, but failed to win the title. Following this, Morrison went on a losing streak, lasting a number of weeks. On the November 7 episode of Raw SuperShow, Morrison picked up his first victory in three months, defeating United States Champion Dolph Ziggler in a non-title match. Morrison challenged Ziggler for the championship at Survivor Series on November 20 but lost.

In his last advertised WWE appearance on the November 28 episode of Raw SuperShow, Morrison faced The Miz in a Falls Count Anywhere match; The Miz won the match by delivering the Skull-Crushing Finale on the steel entrance stage, giving Morrison a (kayfabe) injury. This was used to write Morrison off television, even being stretchered out of the arena after the match. On November 29, WWE acknowledged the end of Morrison's contract, and moved his profile to the alumni section of its website. In a video published on December 9, 2011, via Hennigan's personal YouTube channel, Hennigan claimed that he was taking time off to heal and retrain for a possible return to wrestling in the future. In 2015, Hennigan revealed on Stone Cold Steve Austin's podcast that WWE wanted him to sign another multi-year contract, but due to a neck injury, residual pain, and creative frustrations, he decided to not renew his contract, wanting "more control over [his] time".

=== Independent circuit (2012–2019) ===
After leaving WWE, Hennigan began wrestling on the independent circuit under his real name, as well as his previous ring name John Morrison. On his first post-WWE wrestling appearance, Hennigan rekindled an old feud, facing off against Shelton Benjamin in the main event of the World Wrestling Fan Xperience (WWFX) Champions Showcase Tour in Manila, Philippines on February 4, 2012. Hennigan won the match to become the inaugural WWFX Heavyweight Champion. On August 12, 2012, Hennigan appeared at Juggalo Championship Wrestling's Bloodymania 6 event, defeating Matt Hardy and Breyer Wellington in a three-way match. On January 25, 2013, Morrison appeared at Dragon Gate USA's Open the Golden Gate, defeating Akira Tozawa in the main event of the show. Hennigan took part in the WrestleMania weekend, wrestling for the Pro Wrestling Syndicate. On April 4, Hennigan defeated Elijah Burke and on April 5, Morrison defeated Japanese legend Jushin Thunder Liger in an "International Dream Match" at a Pro Wrestling Syndicate (PWS) event.

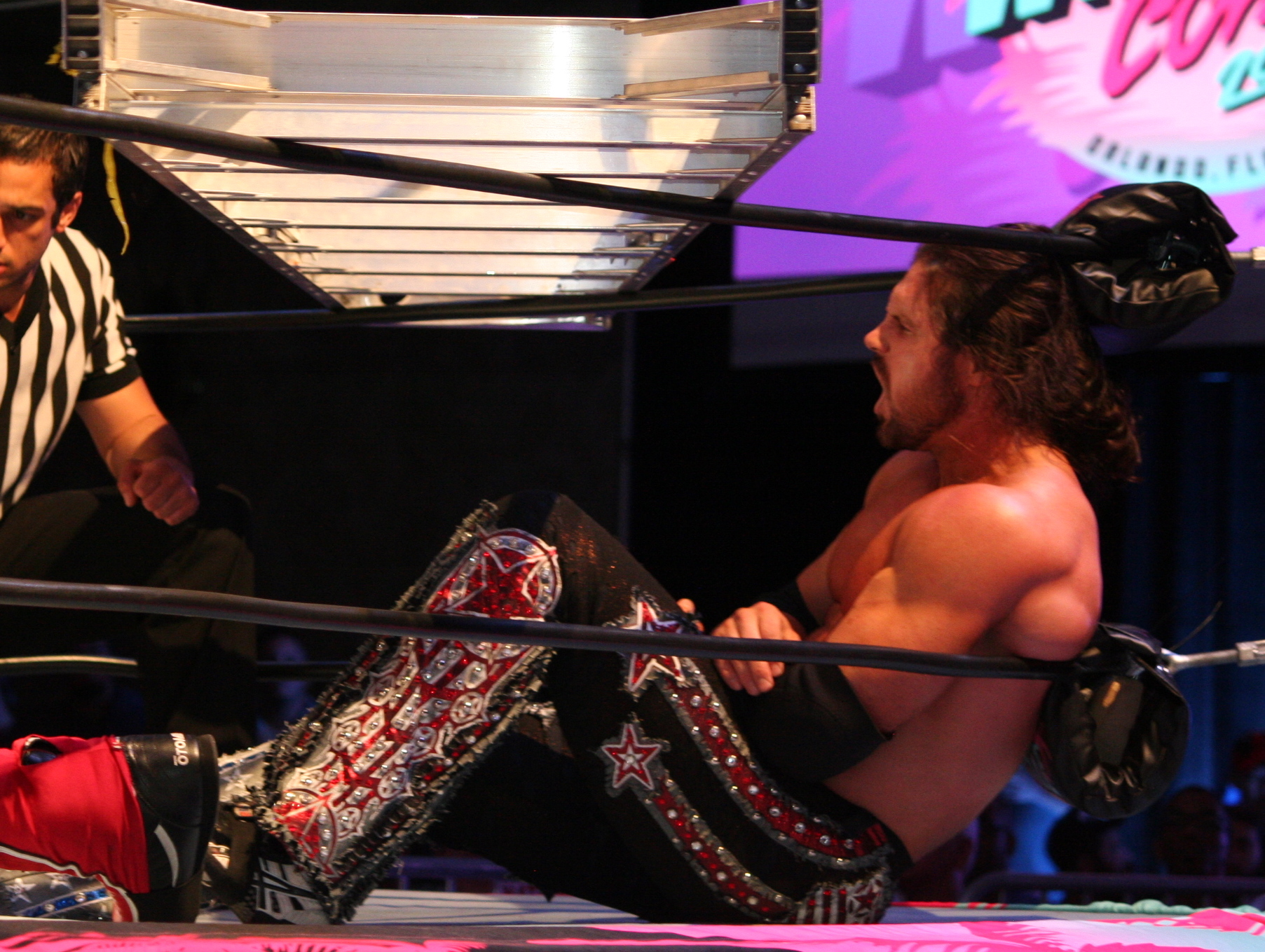
Morrison competing in a ladder match in April 2016

On June 21, 2013, Hennigan defeated Carlito Caribbean Cool in FWE Welcome to the Rumble II, winning the FWE Heavyweight Championship. The next day, Hennigan defended the title against Too Cold Scorpio at House of Hardcore 2. On October 12, 2013, at FWE Grand Prix, Hennigan defeated Matt Morgan, retaining the FWE Heavyweight Championship. On March 11, 2015, Hennigan lost the FWE Heavyweight Championship to A.J. Styles.

On June 28, 2016, it was announced that Hennigan would make his debut for Pro Wrestling Guerilla in the company's annual Battle of Los Angeles tournament. He won his match against Matt Sydal in the first round, but was eliminated by Ricochet in the quarter-finals.

On January 28, 2017, Morrison won a tournament at a 5 Star Wrestling event for the 5 Star Wrestling Championship, defeating Moose, Drew Galloway, and Rey Mysterio to win the title. On February 8, 2018, he lost the title against Jake Hager after over a year as champion.

On September 22, Morrison reunited with former MNM tag team partner Joey Mercury after ten years, defeating Reno Scum.

=== Lucha Underground (2014–2018) ===
In September 2014, it was reported that Hennigan had signed with the El Rey network's new television series, Lucha Underground, where he wrestled under the ring name Johnny Mundo. Mundo wrestled in the main event of the debut episode of Lucha Underground on October 29, 2014, defeating Prince Puma and winning one hundred thousand dollars, which was then taken away from him by promoter Dario Cueto, setting up several feuds. He then teamed with Prince Puma during the November 5, 2014 episode, defeating Cortez Castro and Mr. Cisco. On the November 19 episode, Mundo defeated Big Ryck by disqualification after interference by Castro and Cisco. Mundo then defeated Prince Puma and Big Ryck in the main event of the December 10, 2014 episode, which was a three-way ladder match, to finally win the hundred thousand dollars he was denied in the Lucha Underground debut.

On January 7, 2015, Mundo participated in a 20-man "Aztec Warfare" battle royal for the Lucha Underground Championship. He was the second luchador to enter the ring, but was the last man eliminated by Prince Puma who won the Championship. King Cuerno attacked Mundo on the February 4 episode, beginning a feud between them; the second installment took place on the episode which aired March 11, where Mundo and Cuerno wrestled in a Steel Cage match, which was won by Mundo. On May 13, Mundo turned into a villain when he attacked Alberto El Patrón in his match against Hernandez, throwing him through the window of Dario Cueto's office. Mundo subsequently tossed El Patrón back into the ring, giving Hernandez the win. On the June 17, episode of Lucha Underground, Johnny Mundo unsuccessfully challenged Prince Puma for the Lucha Underground Championship in an Iron Man match. On August 5, 2015, at Ultima Lucha, Mundo defeated Alberto El Patrón after an interference by his girlfriend Melina Perez.

On the February 3, 2016 episode of Lucha Underground, Mundo faced Killshot in a winning effort. After the match, Mundo taunted Lucha Underground Champion Mil Muertes, only to be confronted by Cage. Mundo defeated Cage on February 24, after interference from the debuting Taya, subsequently becoming Mundo's valet. On the May 25 episode of Lucha Underground, Taya revealed to P. J. Black and Jack Evans that their partner Fénix was injured by Mundo. As Mundo revealed himself as Fénix's replacement for their match, Black and Evans allied with the two. Later that night in the main event, Mundo, Black and Evans defeated Rey Mysterio Jr., Prince Puma and Dragon Azteca Jr. to win the Lucha Underground Trios Championship, the first championship for each in Lucha Underground. The week after, Mundo, Black and Evans, now collectively billed as Worldwide Underground, retained their championships in a rematch via disqualification. Worldwide Underground lost their titles to Aero Star, Drago and Fénix at the third and final part Ultima Lucha Dos, which aired on July 20.

On the October 26 episode of Lucha Underground, Mundo defeated Sexy Star to win the Lucha Underground Gift of the Gods Championship after he knocked out Sexy Star with brass knuckles while the referee was unaware. On the November 23 episode of Lucha Underground, he cashed in his Gift of the Gods Championship on Sexy Star before defeating her to win the Lucha Underground Championship, becoming the second Triple Crown Champion in Lucha Underground history. On the December 21 episode of Lucha Underground, Mundo successfully defended his championship in a rematch against Sexy Star inside a steel cage. He lost the title to Prince Puma at Ultima Lucha Tres.

Mundo made his return on the fourth season's premiere, competing in Aztec Warfare entering at number 11. Mundo eliminated Ricky Mundo and Daga before getting eliminated by Marty Martinez and being attacked by the Reptile Tribe. On November 17, 2018, Mundo wrestled on the final episode of Lucha Underground, Ultima Lucha Cuatro, defeating Matanza Cueto in a Sacrifice to the Gods match.

=== Lucha Libre AAA Worldwide (2015–2018) ===
On May 24, 2015, Mundo made his debut for Lucha Libre AAA Worldwide (AAA) at the Lucha Libre World Cup event representing Lucha Underground as a member of "Team TNA/Lucha Underground" alongside TNA wrestlers Matt Hardy and Mr. Anderson. They finished in second place, losing in the finals to the "Dream Team" (El Patrón Alberto, Myzteziz and Rey Mysterio Jr.).

On June 4, 2015 in the main event of Verano de Escándalo, Mundo established himself as a rudo (or villain) and teamed with El Mesias and Pentagón Jr. losing to Myzteziz, La Parka and Rey Mysterio Jr. On September 27, Konnan announced Mundo as an official member of the rudo stable, La Sociedad, while he subsequently stepped down as the leader of the group. On October 4, at Héroes Inmortales IX, Mundo unsuccessfully challenged El Patrón Alberto for the AAA Mega Championship, when he was defeated by disqualification. After Alberto left AAA, Mundo was scheduled to face Rey Mysterio Jr. for the vacant AAA Mega Championship at Guerra de Titanes, but after the matches of the event were officially announced, neither Mundo nor Mysterio were featured for the event. Mundo participated in the 2016 Lucha Libre World Cup as a member of "Team Lucha Underground" alongside Chavo Guerrero Jr. and Brian Cage, defeating "Team Mexico Leyendas" (Blue Demon Jr., Canek, and La Parka) in the quarter-finals, and "Team Mexico International" (Rey Mysterio Jr., Dr. Wagner Jr., and Dragon Azteca Jr.) in the semi-finals. Mundo's team won the tournament defeating "Team AAA" (Pentagón Jr., El Texano Jr. and Psycho Clown) in the finals.

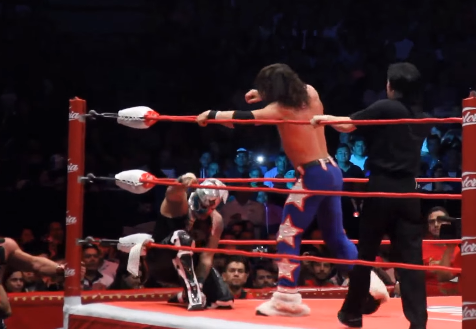
Mundo, wearing USA-themed ring attire, in a match against Pentagon Jr. in June 2016

After adopting an "anti-Mexico" attitude and teaming with El Mesías and Hernandez to defeat El Texano Jr., El Hijo del Fantasma and Pentagón Jr., Mundo challenged the latter to a match at Triplemanía XXIV for the AAA Latin American Championship, to which Pentagón accepted. At the event, on August 28, Mundo defeated Pentagón to win the Latin American Championship, marking his first championship in AAA and becoming the first non-Mexican to hold the title. On October 2 in the main event of Héroes Inmortales X, Mundo successfully defended his title against Garza Jr. On March 19, 2017, at Rey de Reyes, Mundo defeated El Texano Jr. and El Hijo del Fantasma in a three-way match to not only retain the Latin American Championship, but to also win Texano's AAA Mega Championship and Fantasma's AAA World Cruiserweight Championship. In his first AAA Mega Championship defense, on June 30, Mundo successfully retained his title against Texano.

In July 2017, Mundo and his fiancée Kira Forster, known as Taya, were involved in controversy with AAA and its Director of Talent Vampiro, which led to Taya's departure from the company. According to Wrestling Observer, AAA asked Mundo to turn in Taya's Reina de Reinas Championship for a photo shoot the day prior to an event on July 1. A few weeks later, Vampiro addressed to the live crowd that Forster was stripped of the title due to not appearing to defend her title, despite not being scheduled to appear.

On August 26, at Triplemanía XXV, Mundo successfully defended his three championships against Fantasma and Texano in a Tables, Ladders and Chairs match. On October 1 at Héroes Inmortales XI, Mundo wrestled in three matches, retaining the Mega Championship against Rey Wagner, but losing the Latin American Championship to Fantasma in the annual Copa Antonio Peña battle royal, and the World Cruiserweight Championship to Lanzelot in a ten-way match, ending his triple championship reign at 196 days.

On January 26, 2018 at Guerra de Titanes, Mundo lost the AAA Mega Championship to Rey Wagner, ending his reign at 314 days.

=== Impact Wrestling (2017–2019) ===
==== Championship pursuits (2017–2018) ====
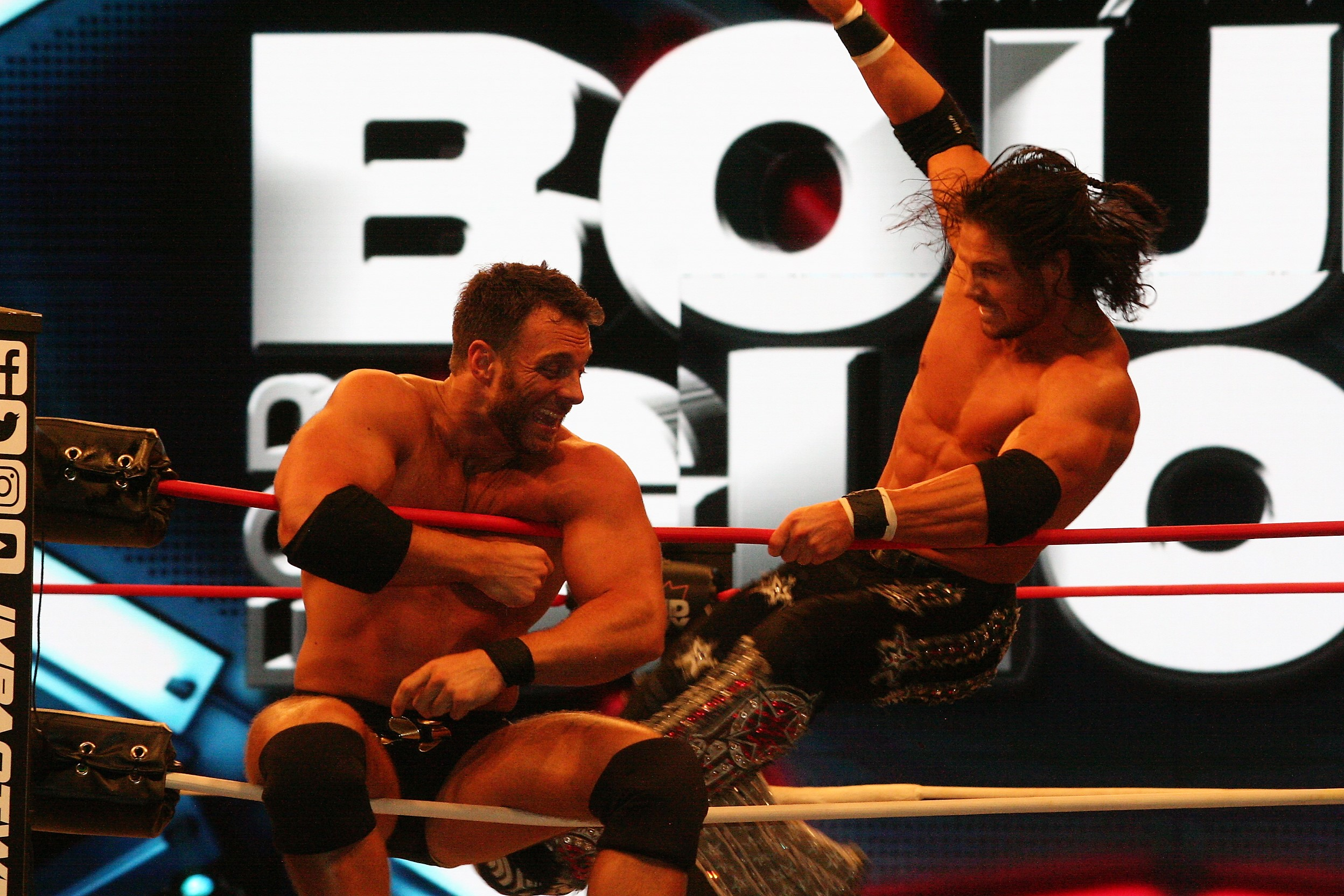
Johnny Impact wrestling Eli Drake at Bound for Glory

In August 2017, despite not being signed to the promotion at the time, Hennigan appeared for Impact Wrestling at some live events. On August 17, a video package was shown at Destination X revealing his ring name as Johnny Impact. His first feud in the promotion was with Eli Drake, when Impact made his televised in-ring debut on the August 24 episode of Impact!, participating in a Gauntlet for the Gold match for the vacant Global Championship, but was eliminated by eventual winner Eli Drake. Impact would face Drake for the title at Victory Road on September 28 and Bound for Glory on November 5, where he failed to win the title. Since the Bound for Glory match ended after Alberto El Patrón made an interference, Impact, Alberto and Drake had a three-way Last Chance Six Sides of Steel match on the January 25, 2018 episode of Impact!, where Drake retained the title.

After Drake lost the renamed Impact World Championship to Austin Aries, Impact began pursuit of Aries's championship, facing him at Crossroads special on March 8, where he lost again. On the April 19 episode of Impact!, Johnny Impact was attacked and injured by Kongo Kong, which was performed to write him off television in order to film for reality television show Survivor. Impact returned at Slammiversary XVI on July 22, when he won a four-way match against Fenix, Taiji Ishimori, and Petey Williams.

==== Impact World Champion (2018–2019) ====
Impact began a feud with the Impact World Champion Austin Aries, which led to a match at Bound for Glory. As the PPV moved closer, the feud started to blur the lines between a work (something scripted) and shoot (something real), beginning with the two wrestlers trading insults on Twitter that they appeared to take personal, with Aries later deleting many of his tweets. Specifically, Impact mocked Aries' short stature and the champion responded by making fun of his wife's weight. Aries and Impact both alleged in the media that they authentically took issue with comments. TMZ Live also pushed the angle "like [it] was a shoot". The two wrestlers got in a brawl the night before Bound for Glory during Abyss's Impact Hall of Fame induction. At the event on October 14, Impact defeated Aries to win the Impact World Championship. Throughout the following weeks, Impact successfully defended his title against Fénix, Killer Kross, and Matt Sydal. At Homecoming on January 6, 2019, Impact defeated Brian Cage to retain his championship.

During the February tapings for Impact Wrestling, Impact defended his title in a four-way contest involving Killer Kross, Moose and Brian Cage. Impact hit his finisher on Moose, barely seconds prior to Cage hitting his Drill Claw finisher on Killer Kross. As Impact was able to cover his opponent first the referee was able to provide the count and therefore Impact won the match as Brian Cage went to cover his opponent. On the March 15 episode of Impact Wrestling, Impact's wife Taya Valkyrie would low blow Cage, which allowed Impact to attack Cage, turning into a villain. At United We Stand on April 4, Impact won a five-way Ultimate X match to become the number one contender for the Impact X Division Championship. Throughout April, Impact successfully defended his title from Cage, often with interferences from Valkyrie and former referee John E Bravo. At Rebellion on April 28, Impact, accompanied by Valkyrie and Bravo, lost the title to Cage in a match where Lance Storm was special guest referee; this left Impact's reign to end at 196 days, leaving it the longest reign since Bobby Roode's 2011–2012 reign, and therefore the longest reign in seven years, as well as the third-longest reign in history.

On the May 31 episode of Impact Wrestling, Impact challenged X Division Champion Rich Swann to a title match at Slammiversary XVII. Later that night, he teamed with Michael Elgin to face Swann and Willie Mack in a tag team match, in which Swann pinned Impact. At Slammiversary XVII on July 7, Impact lost to Swann. On July 8, Pro Wrestling Insider reported that Hennigan's contract with Impact Wrestling had expired several weeks prior to the event, and the two sides agreed to have Hennigan work until Slammiversary.

=== Major League Wrestling (2017–2018) ===
On December 7, 2017, Hennigan debuted for Major League Wrestling (MLW) in the main event of the Never Say Never event, teaming with Shane Strickland in a loss to Darby Allin and Jimmy Havoc. On July 19, 2018, at Battle Riot I, Hennigan participated in the 40-man Battle Riot match, which was won by Tom Lawlor. On September 6, in the main event of WarGames, Hennigan participated in a WarGames match, teaming with Shane Strickland, Tommy Dreamer, Barrington Hughes and Kotto Brazil to defeat Abyss, Jimmy Havoc, Sami Callihan, Fulton and Leon Scott.

=== Return to WWE (2019–2021) ===
On September 26, 2019, it was reported by Mike Johnson of Pro Wrestling Insider that Hennigan had re-signed with WWE, which was officially confirmed by the company on December 3 during WWE Backstage. He made his return on January 3, 2020 episode of SmackDown under his John Morrison ring name and resumed his partnership with The Miz, thus re-establishing him as a heel for the first time in WWE since 2009. They would feud with the SmackDown Tag Team Champions, The New Day, with Morrison winning singles matches against Big E and Kofi Kingston. At Royal Rumble on January 26, 2020, Morrison participated in the Royal Rumble match as the fifth entrant, but he was eliminated by Brock Lesnar. At Super ShowDown on February 27, The Miz and Morrison won the SmackDown Tag Team Championship from The New Day.

On March 8, Morrison and The Miz had their first title defense in a tag team Elimination Chamber match at Elimination Chamber, successfully defending their titles against The New Day, The Usos, Heavy Machinery (Otis and Tucker), Lucha House Party (Gran Metalik and Lince Dorado), and Dolph Ziggler and Robert Roode. On the first night of WrestleMania 36 on April 4, after The Miz's absence due to illness, Morrison defended the SmackDown Tag Team Championships by himself in a ladder match against Kofi Kingston and Jimmy Uso, in which he was successful. On the April 17 episode of SmackDown, the duo lost the titles back to The New Day after The Miz unsuccessfully defended the titles by himself in a triple threat match against Big E and Jey Uso ending their reign at 50 days. At Money in the Bank on May 10, Morrison and The Miz unsuccessfully attempted to regain the championship in a fatal four-way tag team match also involving Lucha House Party (Gran Metalik and Lince Dorado) and The Forgotten Sons (Steve Cutler and Wesley Blake). Morrison and The Miz then started a rivalry with Universal Champion Braun Strowman. At Backlash on June 14, the duo competed for Strowman's title in a two-on-one handicap match, but lost. As part of the 2020 Draft in October, both Morrison and The Miz were drafted to the Raw brand. Prior to the draft, Morrison and The Miz entered a feud with Otis for his Money in the Bank contract. At Hell in a Cell on October 25, Morrison accompanied The Miz in his match against Otis for the contract, which Miz won.

"He's come back and he's kind of been, like, the handyman. He ain't the handyman ... Put some respect on his name because John Morrison is a superstar when given the right opportunity."

— Bobby Lashley on Morrison's role in WWE in March 2021.

On the December 7 episode of Raw, Morrison ended a nearly seven-month losing streak after defeating Drew McIntyre and Sheamus in a 3-on-2 handicap match alongside The Miz and AJ Styles. Morrison entered the 2021 Royal Rumble match on January 31, lasting over eight minutes before being eliminated by Damian Priest. At the Elimination Chamber event on February 21, Morrison defeated Ricochet, Elias, and Mustafa Ali in a fatal four-way match for a spot in the United States Championship match later that night. However, he failed to win the title in a triple threat match against Riddle and reigning champion Bobby Lashley, which was won by Riddle. After this, Morrison and Miz feuded with rapper Bad Bunny and Damian Priest. At WrestleMania 37 on April 10, Morrison and The Miz lost to Bad Bunny and Priest.

After The Miz suffered an injury at WrestleMania Backlash on May 16, Morrison would embark on a singles run, starting by defeating Jeff Hardy on the June 14 episode of Raw. The following week, Morrison defeated Randy Orton to qualify for the Money in the Bank ladder match at the namesake pay-per-view event on July 18, which was won by Big E. On the August 23 episode of Raw, The Miz turned on Morrison by attacking him, thus turning Morrison face and setting up a feud between the pair. However, the feud abruptly ended after the Miz took a hiatus to compete on Dancing with the Stars. On November 18, as part of an eighth round of layoffs due to budget cuts stemming from the COVID-19 pandemic, Morrison was released from his WWE contract.

=== Return to AAA (2022–2023) ===
On February 19, 2022, Hennigan returned to AAA as "Johnny Superstar" (his former ring name in Ohio Valley Wrestling), and unsuccessfully challenged El Hijo del Vikingo at Rey de Reyes for the AAA Mega Championship. At Triplemanía XXX: Monterrey, Hennigan, now under the name "Johnny Caballero", teamed with Taurus in a three-way tag team match to defeat Dragon Lee and Dralístico, and Laredo Kid and Jack Cartwheel. In the main event of Triplemanía XXX: Tijuana, Caballero was revealed as Matt Hardy's mystery tag team partner (due to his original partner Jeff Hardy's arrest five days prior). Caballero, who went under the name "Johnny Hardy", and Matt Hardy lost their match against Dragon Lee and Dralístico. At Triplemanía XXX: Mexico City on October 15, Caballero teamed with Brian Cage and Sam Adonis in a three-way trios match for the AAA World Trios Championship against Psycho Clown, Laredo Kid, and Bandido and champions Nueva Generación Dinamita (El Cuatrero, Sansón, and Forastero). Caballero pinned Laredo Kid to win the match for his team, but did not win the World Trios Championship due to the match stipulation in which the champions must be pinned to win the titles.

At the 2023 Lucha Libre World Cup, Caballero teamed with Christopher Daniels and Sam Adonis as Team United States. In the tournament finals, they fought Team Mexico (Taurus, Pentagón Jr., and Laredo Kid) to a draw; Caballero subsequently lost a sudden death match against Team Mexico's Pentagon Jr.

=== Return to the independent circuit (2022–present) ===
On March 31, 2022, Hennigan debuted for Game Changer Wrestling (GCW) at Josh Barnett's Bloodsport 8, defeating Simon Gotch. The following day, Hennigan, as "Johnny Caballero", wrestled at GCW's Wrld on Lucha event, defeating Jack Cartwheel. On May 28, Hennigan appeared at GCW's Downward Spiral event under the name "Johnny Game Changer", defeating Joey Janela. On June 3, Hennigan debuted for Progress Wrestling in the Super Strong Style 16 tournament under the name "Johnny Progress". He defeated Jack Evans in the first round and Aramis in the quarterfinals, before losing to Warren Banks in the semifinals.

On March 23, 2025, Hennigan appeared at the Beynefit for Bey event hosted by Future Stars of Wrestling (FSW), a benefit show in support of Chris Bey. At the event, he wrestled under his John Morrison name in a three-way match against Ace Austin and Lio Rush, which was won by Austin.

On June 26, 2026, Hennigan appeared in fellow AEW roster member, Evil Uno's, promotion Mystery Wrestling for its 26th event. In this appearance he went by Johnny Mystery in reference to the promotions name. He defeated Canadian wrestler Cecil Nyx in a "first to 25 count match".

On September 23, 2026, Hennigan appeared at the Kranti event for the newly-created promotion Pro Wrestling Rebellion in New Delhi, India. Wrestling as "Johnny Bollywood", he defeated Mansoor in a #1 contendership match for the vacant PWR World Heavyweight Title, before defeating Jora Johl, and fellow MLW talents Big Damo and Dijak in a fatal 4-way to be crowned the inaugural champion.

=== All Elite Wrestling/Ring of Honor (2022–present) ===
On the May 18, 2022 episode of Dynamite, under the ring name "Johnny Elite", Hennigan debuted for All Elite Wrestling (AEW) as the surprise "Joker" entrant in the Owen Hart Cup Memorial Tournament's quarterfinals, being defeated by Samoa Joe. After the match, it was reported that Hennigan had not signed a contract with AEW, but that "the door is open" for him to return. On the May 27 episode of AEW Dark, Elite scored his first victory by defeating Marq Quen. On the June 1 episode of Dynamite, he issued an "open contract" challenge which was answered by a returning Miro, who defeated Elite.

On the June 23, 2023 episode of Rampage, under the new ring name "Johnny TV", Hennigan returned to AEW as the newest member of Q. T. Marshall's stable QTV after attacking Billy Gunn. The following week on Rampage, TV and Marshall defeated Matt Hardy and Isiah Kassidy in their debut match as a team. On the August 11 episode of Rampage, TV unsuccessfully challenged Orange Cassidy for the AEW International Championship. After Marshall announced his departure from AEW in November, Johnny TV began appearing for the company's sister promotion Ring of Honor (ROH). At Final Battle on December 15, TV interfered in the Survival of the Fittest match for the vacant ROH World Television Championship by attacking Dalton Castle. In the following weeks, TV and Castle appeared in various segments in which the latter attempted to have a match with TV, but would be rebuffed until February 2024, when TV agreed to a match for the custody of Castle's teammates The Boys (Brandon and Brent Tate). On the February 29 episode of Ring of Honor Wrestling, Johnny TV defeated Castle and gained custody of The Boys. At Supercard of Honor, Castle defeated Johnny TV in a Fight Without Honor with assistance from several people disguised as The Boys, including Jack Cartwheel and Paul Walter Hauser. At Death Before Dishonor on July 26, Johnny TV participated in a Survival of the Fittest match for the ROH World Television Championship against Brian Cage, Lee Johnson, Lio Rush, Shane Taylor, and reigning champion Atlantis Jr., making it to the final three before being eliminated by Cage.

On the November 2, 2024 episode of Collision, TV formed an alliance with MxM Collection. At the Revolution pre-show on March 9, 2025, TV and MxM Collection lost to "Big Boom!" A.J., Orange Cassidy and Mark Briscoe in a trios match. TV and MxM Collection were later joined by TV's real-life wife Taya Valkyrie to form MxM TV.

=== Return to MLW (2023) ===
On January 7, 2023, Hennigan returned to Major League Wrestling at their Blood and Thunder pay-per-view under the ring name Johnny Fusion and defeated Davey Richards to win their National Openweight Championship. On April 6, at War Chamber, Hennigan lost the title to Jacob Fatu, ending his reign at 89 days.

=== Consejo Mundial de Lucha Libre (2026–present) ===
On January 30, 2026, MxM TV debuted for Consejo Mundial de Lucha Libre (CMLL), with Hennigan announcing himself as Johnny Consejo. The group defeated Soberano Jr. and Los Hermanos Chàvez (Ángel de Oro and Niebla Roja). Consejo began a feud with Ángel de Oro which culminated in a Cabellera contra Cabellera ("hair vs. hair") match on February 27, in which Consejo lost and was forced to shave his head.

== Professional wrestling style and persona ==
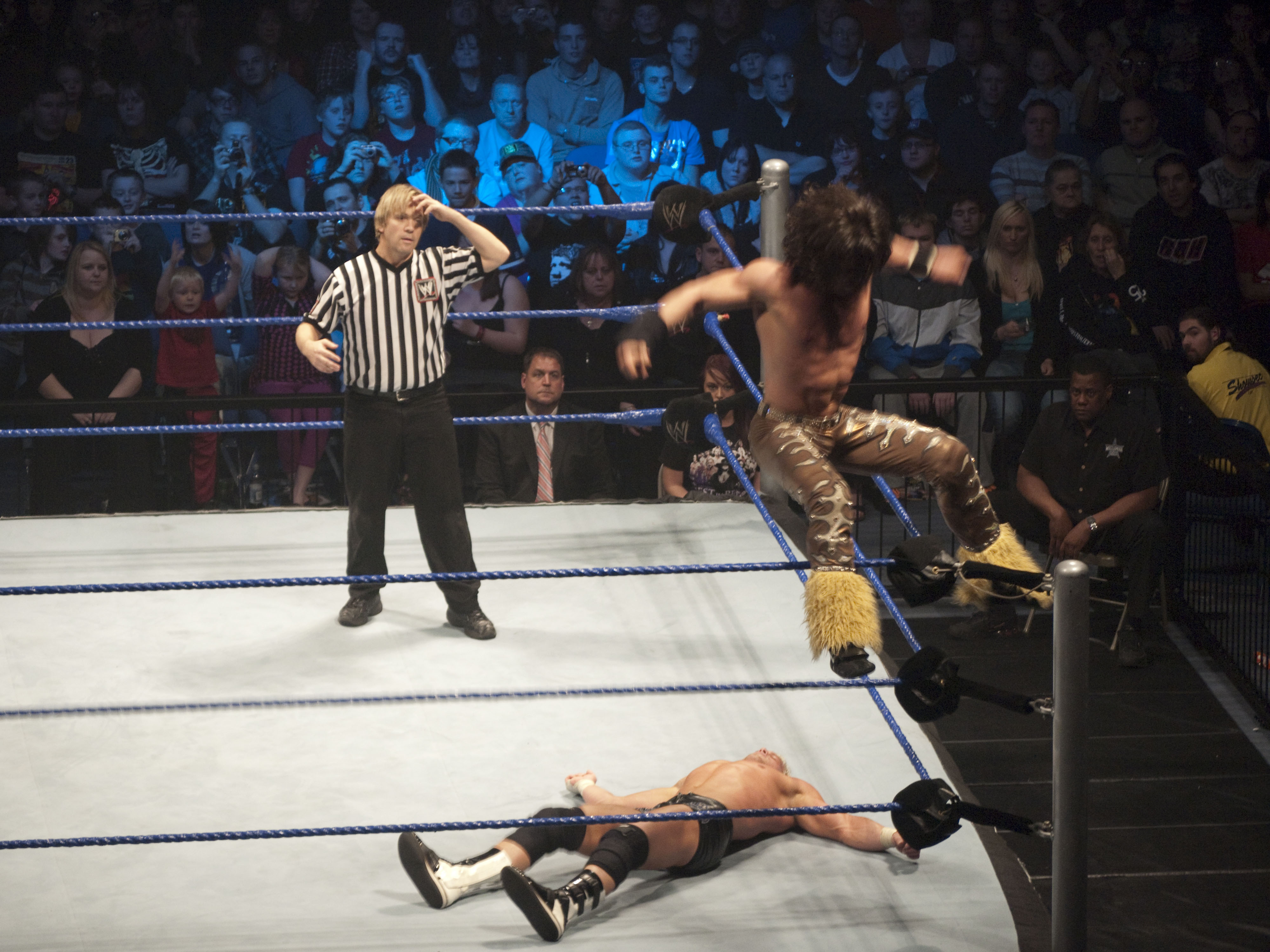
Morrison performing Starship Pain, a split-legged corkscrew moonsault

Hennigan was described by WWE as having "lightning-fast offense", "high-risk aerial expertise", and "incredible agility". He is known to utilize a split-legged corkscrew moonsault, dubbed Starship Pain, as a finishing maneuver. During his singles run as Johnny Nitro, he used a standing shooting star press as his finisher. After transitioning to his John Morrison character, Hennigan began using a corkscrew neckbreaker dubbed Moonlight Drive, in reference to the song of the same name written by Jim Morrison. He also prominently used a superkick as a finisher in 2008 during a feud with D-Generation X, as a way to mock Shawn Michaels's Sweet Chin Music maneuver. During his time in Impact Wrestling, he used a diving 450 elbow drop as a finisher called the Impact Elbow. Hennigan is a practitioner of parkour and often incorporates it into his wrestling style, giving him the nickname "The Prince of Parkour". He also has a background in amateur wrestling, breakdancing, gymnastics, and martial arts. Regarding his unique wrestling style, Hennigan stated in a 2021 interview with Sports Illustrated:

My movement background is different from everyone on the roster. I was an amateur collegiate wrestler at UC Davis. I also did gymnastics at UC Davis. I've studied kung fu, boxing, capoeira, stunt fighting, parkour—I am a master at all those disciplines. Applying those movement patterns is what I do in the ring.

Alongside his team MNM, Hennigan debuted on WWE television as Johnny Nitro, presenting himself as an arrogant wrestler with "elite Hollywood status". After winning the ECW World Championship in 2007, he changed his ring name to John Morrison and his gimmick was tweaked to be even more conceited and self-aggrandizing — in addition to being modeled after Jim Morrison, the legendary frontman of the 1960s rock band The Doors, to whom he bears a strong resemblance. Following his return to WWE and reunion with his tag team partner the Miz in 2020, Hennigan added a comedic aspect to his villainous character, with WWE describing him as using "quirkiness and quick wit to shine every time he is on screen". He also began to refer to himself as "Johnny Drip Drip", a reference to the song "Drip" by rapper Cardi B.

Outside of WWE, Hennigan began referring to himself as the "Mayor of Slamtown", a fictional town he first coined in Lucha Underground in 2015. Hennigan filed to trademark the term "Slamtown" in November 2020.

=== Ring names ===
Hennigan is known for using several ring name during his career, usually the first name Johnny and the last name being a reference to the promotion where he worked. In 2026, when he debuted for Consejo Mundial de Lucha Libre as Johnny Consejo, it was announced as the 34th name in his career.

Ring Name	Promotion
Johnny Nitro; John Morrisonn	WWE
Johnny Impact	Impact Wrestling
Johnny TV; Johnny Elite	AEW/ROH
Johnny Consejo	CMLL
Johnny Fusion	MLW
Johnny Mundo	AAA, Lucha Underground
Johnny Blaze	
John Hennigann	Various promotions
Johnny Hardy	AAA
Johnny Superstar	OVW
Johnny Blackcraft	
Johnny Bollywood	
Johnny Downunder	WSW
Johnny Foxwoods	Beyond Wrestling
Johnny Mystery	Mystery Wrestling
Johnny Progress,	Progress Wrestling
Johnny Ultra	
Johnny Onyx	SPW

== Boxing record ==
1 fight	1 win	0 losses
By knockout	1	0

No.	Result	Record	Opponent	Type	Round, time	Date	Location	Notes
1	Win	1–0	Harley Morenstein	TKO	3 (5)	April 15, 2023	Amalie Arena, Tampa, Florida, U.S.	Exhibition bout

== Other media ==
In 2009, Hennigan and Maryse Ouellet were interviewed on Eurosport. In 2009, Hennigan appeared on two episodes of Are You Smarter Than a 5th Grader?, which were both aired on September 29. Hennigan is the subject of a WWE DVD, called John Morrison – Rock Star, which was released on February 16, 2010. The DVD covers his career from his name change to John Morrison up until his Intercontinental Championship win in September 2009. He appeared on an episode of Destroy Build Destroy on March 3, 2010. Hennigan was on the cover of Muscle & Fitness in June 2010, with the issue also featuring an interview and photo shoot. In 2013, Hennigan released a fitness DVD program titled Out of Your Mind Fitness. In 2016, Hennigan, Rey Mysterio, and King Cuerno appeared on ESPN to promote the second season of Lucha Underground.

Hennigan is also a frequent collaborator with comic book-based film producers Bat in the Sun Productions, appearing in two episodes of their well-known Super Power Beat Down series; playing as Casey Jones against Kick-Ass in episode 13, and as Winter Soldier against Nightwing in episode 19. Hennigan portrayed Eternal Warrior in the web series Ninjak vs. the Valiant Universe, produced by Valiant Entertainment and directed by Bat in the Sun.

Hennigan is a playable character in WWE SmackDown vs Raw 2007 and WWE SmackDown vs Raw 2008 as "Johnny Nitro", WWE SmackDown vs Raw 2009, WWE SmackDown vs Raw 2010, WWE SmackDown vs Raw 2011, WWE '12 and WWE 2K22 as "John Morrison", and RetroMania Wrestling under the name "Johnny Retro".

=== Filmmaking ===
After leaving WWE in 2011, Hennigan pursued a career in the film industry as an actor and filmmaker. In 2013, he appeared in 20 Feet Below: The Darkness Descending with Danny Trejo, as well as served as co-producer of the film. In 2017, Hennigan released his first feature film titled Boone: The Bounty Hunter, which he starred in, co-wrote, and served as executive producer of. Hennigan sold his house in order to finance the film.

On October 31, 2022, Hennigan announced the release of his directorial debut, a comedy horror short film titled The Iron Sheik Massacre which he also produced and co-wrote with his wife Kira Forster. The film stars Hennigan and Forster alongside fellow wrestlers Karrion Kross, PJ Black, Holly Meowy, Super Panda, and the voice of The Iron Sheik, and had its first screening on November 5, 2022 at the Los Angeles International Film Festival.

=== Survivor: David vs. Goliath ===
Hennigan was a contestant on the 37th season of Survivor, Survivor: David vs. Goliath where he was originally part of the Goliath tribe and later the Tiva tribe before making it to the merged tribe Kalokalo. He finished 12th out of 20 contestants and became the second member of the jury after the former members of the Goliath tribe were blindsided at tribal council; two contestants used hidden immunity idols, causing Hennigan to be eliminated despite only having three elimination votes, as Christian Hubicki, who received seven, was immune.

Hennigan's performance as a contestant and the episode of his elimination received critical acclaim. Chris Chase of USA Today praised Hennigan for being "true to everything we've seen from him this season, [and] a class act after his shock defeat". Writing for People, former Survivor contestant Stephen Fishbach highlighted that "in a tribal council that was meant to take out the Davidest David [Christian Hubicki], it was really the Goliath of the Goliaths [Hennigan] who fell. How perfectly Biblical." The show's executive producer and host Jeff Probst was "so impressed" with Hennigan, describing him as "the guy who catches the winning touchdown pass in the final moments of the Super Bowl, and then, instead of some crazy celebration, he casually tosses the ball to the ref, kisses his wife and hugs his kids", alongside stating that he would "absolutely" have Hennigan back on the show.

=== Boxing ===
On May 14, 2022, Hennigan appeared at the Creator Clash event, accompanying Nathan Barnatt (known as "Dad") for his match against Matt Watson, which Barnatt won. In January 2023, it was announced that Hennigan would fight Harley Morenstein at Creator Clash 2 in his boxing debut. On the night of the event, Hennigan defeated Morenstein via TKO in the third round. He was accompanied to the ring by fellow WWE wrestlers including LA Knight, Karrion Kross, Scarlett, Mojo Rawley and "Hacksaw" Jim Duggan.

== Filmography ==
Film
Year	Title	Role	Notes
2010	John Morrison – Rock Star	Himself	Credited as John Morrison
2012	Legion of the Black	Lead Shadow Creature	
2013	20 Feet Below: The Darkness Descending	Razor	Co-producer
2014	Ascent to Hell	Roman	
2014	Hercules Reborn	Hercules	Stunts performer
2015	Wrestling Isn't Wrestling	80s Russian Wrestler	
2015	American Justice	Officer Reid	
2015	Russell Madness	The Hammer	
2015	Stormageddon	Adam	
2016	Sinbad and The War of the Furies	Sinbad	
2017	Boone: The Bounty Hunter	Boone	Co-writer; Executive producer
2017	Dave Made a Maze	The Minotaur	
2017	Never Leave Alive	Rick Rainsford	
2018	Strange Nature	Sam	Co-producer
2020	Birds of Prey	Lords Gang Member	Stunts performer
2020	The Speed of Time	Johnny Killfire	Producer; Fight coordinator
2022	The Iron Sheik Massacre	John	Short film Director, writer, and producer Also released as The Sheik Massacre

Television
Year	Title	Role	Notes
2002–2003	Tough Enough III	Himself	14 episodes; Co-winner
2009	Are You Smarter than a 5th Grader?	Himself	2 episodes
2010	Destroy Build Destroy	Himself	1 episode
2013	NTSF:SD:SUV::	Sammy	Episode: "A Hard Drive to Swallow"
2014–2018	Lucha Underground	Johnny Mundo	
2016	Shameless	Cody	Episode: "Hiraeth"
2016	Bajillion Dollar Propertie$	Brash Roderick	Episode: "Predator Party"
2017	Days of Our Lives	Goon #2	1 episode
2017	Baby Daddy	Ryan Davidson	Episode: "Ben Rides a Unicorn"
2017	GLOW	Salty Johnson	Episode: "Pilot"
2017	The Last Ship	Ares	3 episodes
2017	The Guest Book	Steve	Episode: "Story Four"
2017	Sharknado 5: Global Swarming	Rodolfo	Television film
2018	Survivor: David vs. Goliath	Himself	14 episodes; 12th place and 2nd jury member
2018–2020	Miz & Mrs.	Himself	5 episodes
2022	The Guardians of Justice	Red Talon	Episode: "It Was Murder, She Said!"

Web
Year	Title	Role	Notes
2014	Video Game High School	Crazy Napalm Suit	1 episode; cameo
2014–2016	Super Power Beat Down	Casey Jones / Winter Soldier	2 episodes
2016	Free Play	Himself	Episode: "Lucha Libre with Johnny Mundo"
2017	Haus of Pain	Himself	Documentary
2018	Ninjak vs. the Valiant Universe	Eternal Warrior	6 episodes
2019	Being The Elite	Himself	Episode: "What Time Is It In London?"
2020	Dad: Andan's Run	Aelpha	YouTube movie based on Dad Feels series

Video games
Year	Title
2006	WWE SmackDown vs. Raw 2007
2007	WWE SmackDown vs. Raw 2008
2008	WWE SmackDown vs. Raw 2009
2009	WWE Legends of WrestleMania
2009	WWE SmackDown vs. Raw 2010
2010	WWE SmackDown vs. Raw 2011
2011	WWE All Stars
2011	WWE '12
2021	RetroMania Wrestling
2022	WWE 2K22

== Personal life ==
Hennigan is good friends with fellow professional wrestlers The Miz, Nic Nemeth, Matt Cardona, Jeff Hardy, and Randy Orton. He was also good friends with Shad Gaspard and JTG of Cryme Tyme, and still remains friends with the latter; they were a part of the search team after Gaspard's disappearance and death.

Hennigan was involved in an on-off relationship with former WWE Diva and on-screen manager Melina Perez from 2003 to 2015. The pair met during the auditions for Tough Enough III, in which Perez was cut and Hennigan eventually won. Since 2016, Hennigan has been in a relationship with Kira Forster, better known as Taya Valkyrie. The pair met through the affiliation between AAA and Lucha Underground, with Forster becoming Hennigan's on-screen partner in the latter promotion prior to their real-life relationship. They became engaged on June 14, 2017, and were married on June 1, 2018.

== Championships and accomplishments ==
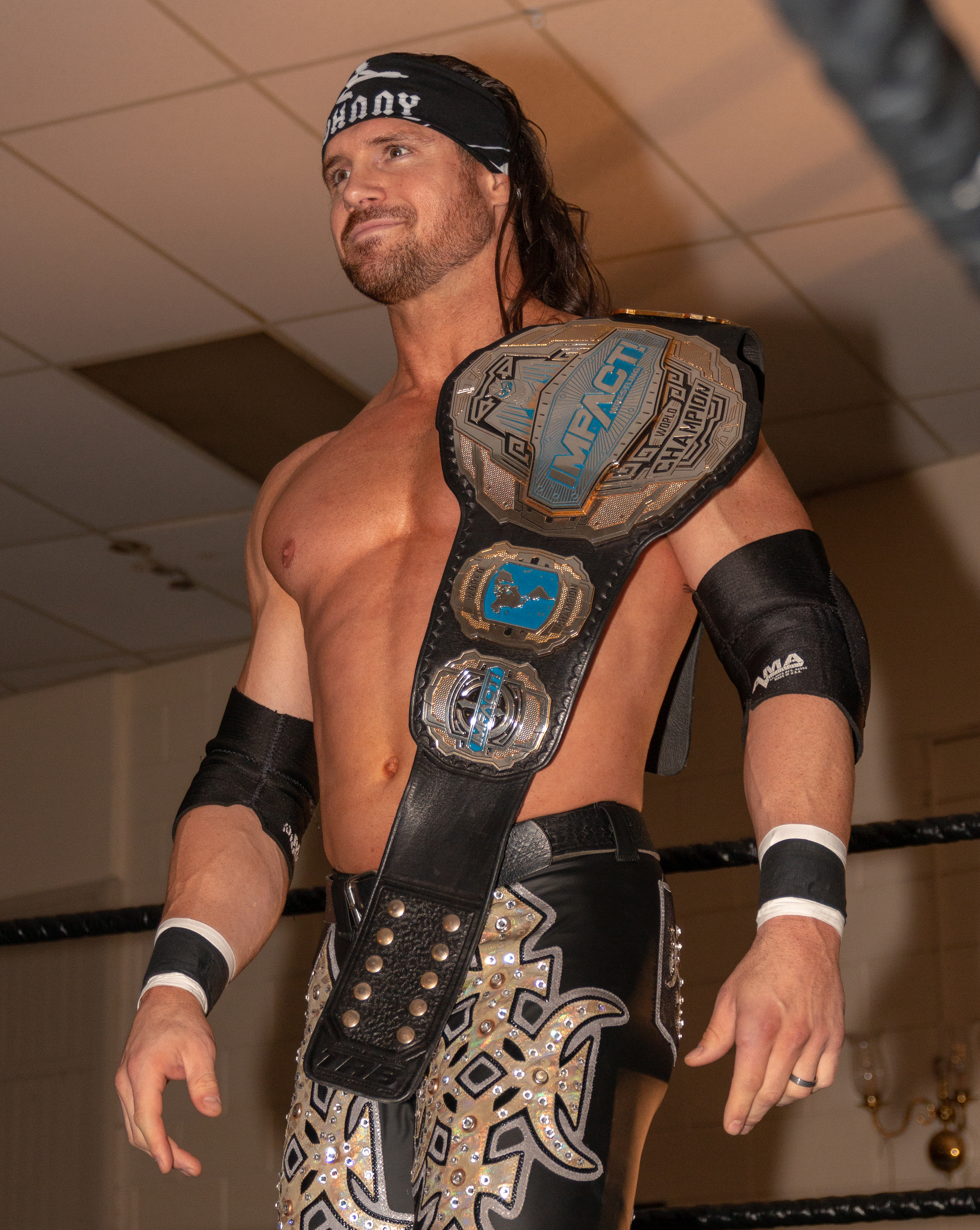
Morrison (as Johnny Impact) is a former Impact World Champion in Impact Wrestling...

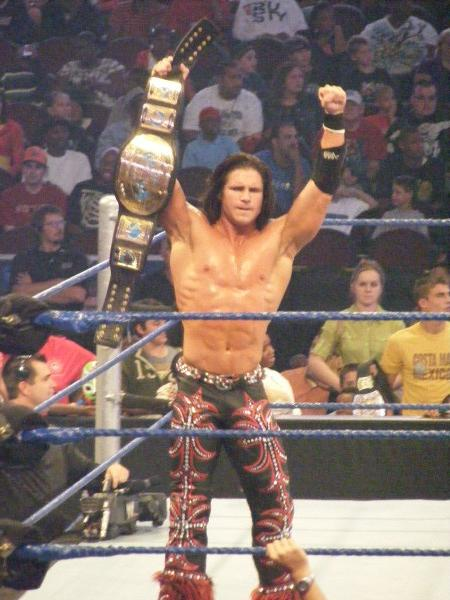
...a three-time WWE Intercontinental Champion...

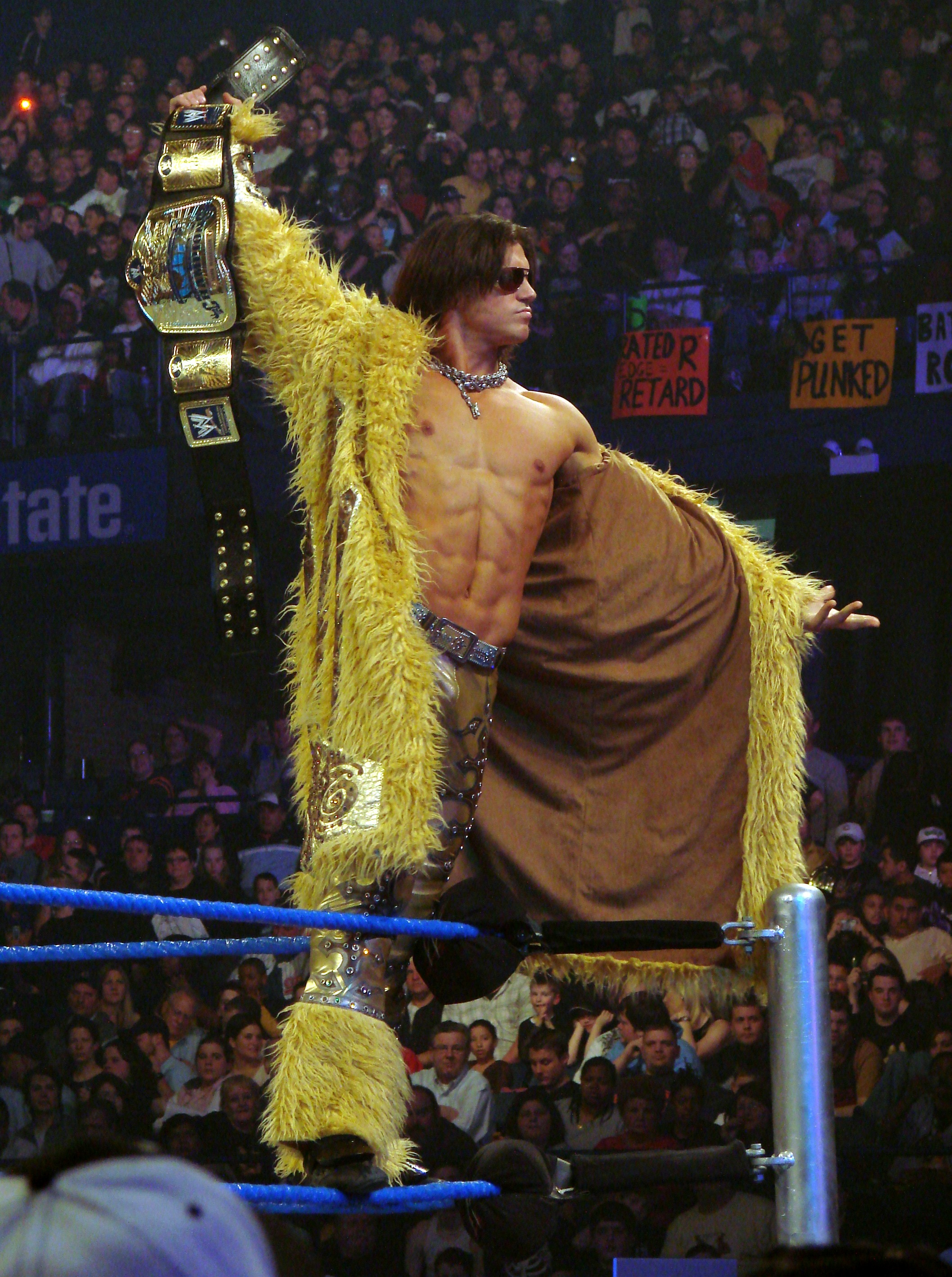
...and an overall six-time tag team champion in WWE (shown here with the WWE Tag Team Championship, which he held four times)

- 5 Star Wrestling
  - 5 Star Wrestling Championship (1 time, inaugural)
  - One Night Tournament (2017)
- ACW Wisconsin
  - ACW Heavyweight Championship (1 time)
- The Baltimore Sun
  - Tag Team of the Year (2008) – with The Miz
- Blackcraft Wrestling
  - BCW Heavyweight Championship (1 time)
- Continental Wrestling Federation
  - CWF United States Championship (1 time)
- DDT Pro-Wrestling
  - Ironman Heavymetalweight Championship (1 time)
- European Pro Wrestling
  - EPW Heavyweight Championship (1 time)
- Family Wrestling Entertainment
  - FWE Heavyweight Championship (1 time)
- Future Stars of Wrestling
  - FSW Mecca Grand Championship (1 time)
- Impact Wrestling
  - Impact World Championship (1 time)
- Lucha Libre AAA Worldwide
  - AAA Mega Championship (1 time)
  - AAA Latin American Championship (1 time)
  - AAA World Cruiserweight Championship (1 time)
  - Lucha Libre World Cup (2016 Men's Division) – with Chavo Guerrero Jr. and Brian Cage
- Lucha Underground
  - Lucha Underground Championship (1 time)
  - Lucha Underground Gift of the Gods Championship (1 time)
  - Lucha Underground Trios Championship (1 time) – with Jack Evans and P. J. Black
  - Second Triple Crown Champion
- Major League Wrestling
  - MLW National Openweight Championship (1 time)
- Mondo Lucha
  - Mondo Lucha Championship (1 time)
  - Mondo Lucha Tag Team Championship (1 time) - with Matt Cross
- Mystery Wrestling
  - Mystery Wrestling World Championship (1 time)
- Next Generation Wrestling
  - NGW World Championship (1 time, inaugural)
  - NGW World Title Tournament (2013)
- Ohio Valley Wrestling
  - OVW Southern Tag Team Championship (1 time) – with Joey Matthews
- Pacific Coast Wrestling/PCW Ultra
  - PCW Heavyweight Championship (1 time)
- Pandemonium: Pro Wrestling
  - Pandemonium TV Championship (1 time)
- Pro Wrestling Illustrated
  - Most Improved Wrestler of the Year (2009)
  - Tag Team of the Year (2005) – with Joey Mercury
  - Ranked No. 24 of the top 500 singles wrestlers in the PWI 500 in 2017
- Pro Wrestling Rebellion
  - PWR World Heavyweight Championship (1 time, inaugural, current)
- Qatar Pro Wrestling
  - QPW Souq Waqif Championship (1 time)
  - QPW Souq Waqif Title Tournament (2015)
- Rogue Wrestling
  - Rogue Championship (1 time, inaugural)
  - Rogue Championship Tournament (2019)
- VIP Wrestling
  - VIP Heavyweight Championship (1 time)
- World Wrestling Entertainment/WWE
  - ECW World Championship (1 time)
  - WWE Intercontinental Championship (3 times)
  - WWE Tag Team Championship (4 times) – with Joey Mercury (3) and The Miz (1)
  - World Tag Team Championship (1 time) – with The Miz
  - WWE SmackDown Tag Team Championship (1 time) – with The Miz
  - ECW World Championship Tournament (2007)
  - Tough Enough III (2003) with Matt Cappotelli
  - Slammy Award (2 times)
    - Tag Team of the Year (2008) – with The Miz
    - Best WWE.com Exclusive (2008) – with The Miz
- World Series Wrestling
  - WSW Heavyweight Championship (2 times)
- World Wrestling Fan Xperience
  - WWFX Heavyweight Championship (1 time)
- Wrestling Observer Newsletter
  - Tag Team of the Year (2008) – with The Miz

== Luchas de Apuestas record ==
Winner (wager)	Loser (wager)	Location	Event	Date	Notes
Prince Puma (career)	Johnny Mundo (championship)	Los Angeles, California	Ultima Lucha Tres	June 26, 2016^{1}	
Ángel de Oro (hair)	Johnny Consejo (hair)	Mexico City, Mexico	Viernes Espectacular	February 27, 2026	

^{1} The episode aired on tape delay on October 18, 2017.
