= Mystery Wrestling World Championship =

Canadian wrestling championship

Details
- Promotion: Mystery Wrestling
- Date established: January 19, 2025
- Current champion: Cool Ref

The Mystery Wrestling World Championship is a professional wrestling world heavyweight championship in Mystery Wrestling. The current champion is Cool Ref who defeated Johnny Mystery to win the title.

== Title history ==
Key

No.	Overall reign number
Reign	Reign number for the specific champion
Days	Number of days held
+	Current reign is changing daily

No.	Wrestler	Reign	Date	Days held	Venue	Location	Event	Notes	Ref.
1	Psycho Mike	1	January 19, 2025	133	Centre Adelyu	Gatineau, Quebec, Canada	Mystery Wrestling 13: For All The Marbles		
2	Stu Grayson	1	June 1, 2025	286	Centre Adelyu	Gatineau, Quebec, Canada	Mystery Wrestling 16		
3	London Lightning	1	March 14, 2026	133	Centre Adelyu	Gatineau, Quebec, Canada	Mystery Wrestling 22		
4	Johnny Mystery	1	July 25, 2026	78	Bain Mathieu	Montreal, Quebec, Canada	Mystery Wrestling 27		
5	Cool Ref	1	October 11, 2026	2+	Centre Aydelu	Gatineau, Quebec, Canada	Mystery Wrestling 30		
