= Kinga Philipps =

American actress

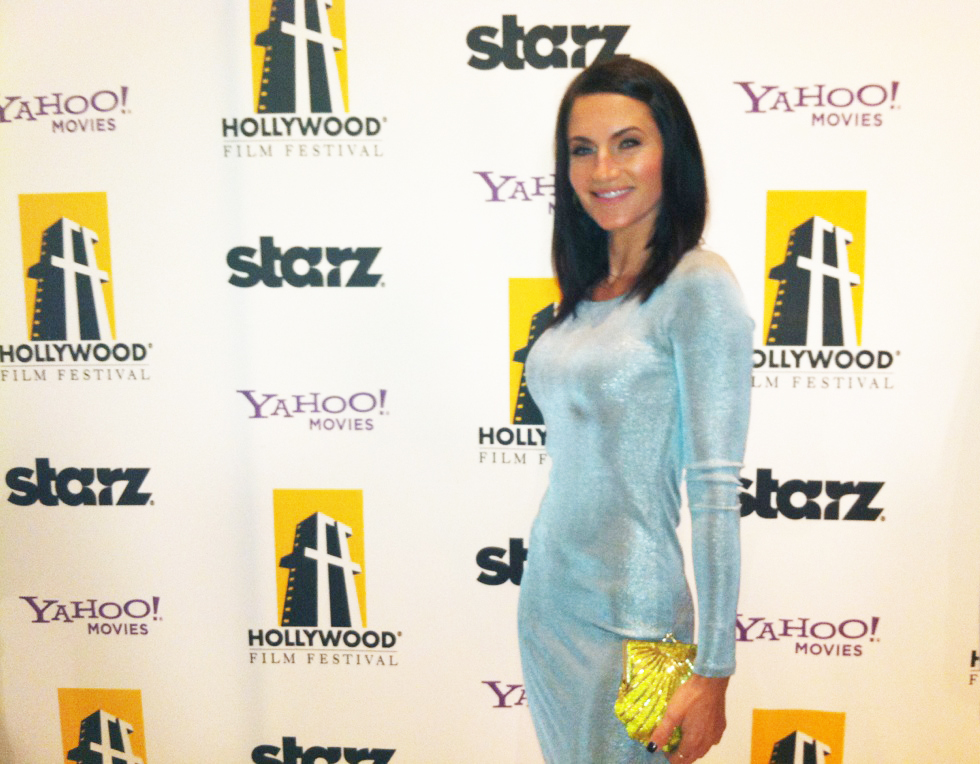
- Born: Kinga Szpakiewicz; Warsaw, Poland
- Occupations: Actress, journalist
- Years active: 2001–present

Kinga Philipps is a Polish American actress and journalist. She has been a correspondent for a variety of networks including: USA Network, AMC, Food Network, Current TV, Fox Sports, SyFy, National Geographic Channel and Travel Channel.

== Early life ==
Philipps was born Kinga Szpakiewicz in Warsaw, Poland and grew up in Bartlesville, Oklahoma, United States. She is a graduate of Oklahoma State University.

== Career ==
In her acting career she has guest starred on a number of television shows including: The West Wing, Cold Case, According to Jim, Eleventh Hour, NCIS: Los Angeles, Perception and Scandal. She has also appeared in several films including: Tomcats, Torque, 20 Feet Below: The Darkness Descending and several Lifetime films. She can be seen as Austin Powers's mother in the 2002 film Austin Powers in Goldmember where, in a flashback, she and an infant Powers are blown up by enemy agents in the family car.

Philipps was one of the original hosts of Current TV, the network started by Al Gore. She originally hosted Google Current, a daily comedic look at what the world is searching for online. She then went on to host Yahoo Current Driver and Yahoo Current Traveler, two shows that resulted from Current's partnership with Yahoo. Additionally, Philipps covered hard news for Current's Vanguard division and did various in studio coverage for the network. When Current won an Emmy in 2007 for Best Interactive Television Service, Philipps covered the event with a pod titled "Kinga Goes to the Emmys."

In 2011, Philipps joined Syfy on their new show Legend Quest. Legend Quest is a fast-paced action-adventure series, which follows symbologist and archeological explorer Ashley Cowie as he travels the world with his field producer (Philipps) and their team in search of some of history's greatest and most mysterious artifacts.

On July 4, 2012, the National Geographic Channel series America's Lost Treasures premiered, hosted by Kinga Philipps and Curt Doussett. The 10-part series developed by Thom Beers and Original Productions travels the country looking for hidden links to America's past.

In 2013, she starred in 20 Feet Below: The Darkness Descending. Kinga won Best Actress for her role in the film at the 2013 Action On Film International Film Festival.

Since 2013 Kinga has been working with Travel Channel hosting the series The Wild Side With Kinga Philipps and Real. She also contributes to Travel Channel's yearly special, The Trip. In 2015 Travel Channel's Real: Malibu won a silver Telly Award.

Kinga is the co-owner of Rebel Belle Productions creating inspiring scripted and unscripted content in the space of adventure travel, history, anthropology and cuisine.

As a travel writer Kinga regularly contributes to outlets like Wandermelon, The Wayward Post and Real Clear Life.

Kinga hosts the new television series Finding Adventure on Very Local on Roku and Fire T.V.
