= 20 Feet Below: The Darkness Descending =

- Film poster
- Directed by: Marc Clebanoff
- Written by: Frank Krueger
- Based on: The Darkness Descending by Marc Clebanoff
- Produced by: Frank Krueger; Darren Darnborough; Kinga Philipps; Wylie Small
- Starring: Danny Trejo; Kinga Philipps; Frank Krueger
- Cinematography: Lan Bui; Vu Bui
- Edited by: Austin Anderson
- Music by: Ben Zarai
- Production companies: Odyssey Motion Pictures; Blue Dragon Entertainment
- Distributed by: Vertical Entertainment
- Release date: July 20, 2013 (San Diego Comic-Con)
- Running time: 95 minutes
- Country: United States
- Language: English

20 Feet Below: The Darkness Descending (also Redemption: The Darkness Descending) is a 2013 American horror film directed by Marc Clebanoff, written by Frank Krueger, and starring Danny Trejo, Kinga Philipps and Krueger. Philipps plays a documentary filmmaker who enters abandoned New York City Subway tunnels to film a documentary on the homeless people who live there, which include an ex-cop (Krueger) and cult leader (Trejo). The film is based on an earlier web series by Clebanoff.

== Plot ==
Documentary filmmaker Chelsea enters abandoned New York City Subway tunnels that homeless squatters use. Cops Smitty and Lockeheed warn her to be careful, but she dismisses their concerns. There, she befriends and interviews Skeeter, who leads her on a tour. Skeeter introduces her to Jake, an ex-cop who has become self-destructive since his wife's murder; Gabriel, a former social worker; Harmony, an artist; Razor and Ajax, gang members; Flash and Alexis, orphaned twins; and, at her insistence, Angel, the leader of a cult-like, violent anarchist gang. Angel plans a revolution against the surface world, whom he blames for persecuting the homeless. After he offhandedly threatens to murder Chelsea as a show of power, Angel releases her and tells her to warn the surface world of his wrath.

Instead of fleeing, Chelsea stays back and records a hazing ritual performed by Angel's gang. When Ajax discovers her, Jake rescues Chelsea, drawing further ire of the gang, who promise retaliations against both of them. The increased gang activity, including the murder of a Wall Street investor, draws the attention of the cops, who organize a sweep through the tunnels. Lockeheed's aggressive behavior during the raid culminates in a violent confrontation with Jake. As Smitty defuses the situation, the gang quietly abducts a young and idealistic cop named Jimmy. Angel sets fire to Jake's home and mounts Jimmy's bloody body nearby as a warning. Chelsea and Gabriel rescue Jake, and they attempt to help Jimmy, who is already dead.

Above ground, Smitty and Lockeheed argue over Jake and return to the tunnels to interrogate him about Jimmy, who has been reported missing. When Lockeheed finds Jake next to Jimmy's dead body, Smitty is no longer able to hold him back. Jake flees deeper into the tunnels, where he receives conflicting advice from Gabriel and Flash. Gabriel advises him to avoid violence, and Flash urges him to confront Angel. When Ajax fails to kill Flash and instead gets beaten, Angel kills Ajax. Angel then sends his gang out to set bombs in the subway tunnels, and Jake forces Skeeter to lead him to Angel's lair, which is hidden in the deepest, maze-like tunnels. Jake attempts to stop Razor from setting a bomb, but it explodes, derails a subway train, and brings further police activity in the tunnels.

Razor and Jake fight each other; when Lockeheed shoots Jake in the arm, Razor and Jake both flee into the tunnels. Angel's gang wounds Flash as they kidnap Chelsea. Smitty arrests Jake, but Jake convinces Smitty to let him go so that he can rescue Chelsea. When Jake reaches Angel, he discovers that Angel has planned his own death so that he will become a legend to his followers. Smitty and Lockeheed, who have reconciled, converge with the rest of the homeless people on Angel's lair, and they join Chelsea in attempting to stop Jake from killing Angel. Sensing Jake's reluctance, Angel reveals that he was the one who killed Jake's wife. At the last minute, Jake accepts Gabriel's advice and chooses to forgo violence and revenge. Smitty and Lockeheed arrest Angel and lead him away.

== Cast ==
- Danny Trejo as Angel
- Kinga Philipps as Chelsea
- Frank Krueger as Jake
- Tiffany Adams as Gabriel
- Kristoff St. John as "Smitty" Smith
- Louis Mandylor as "Lockeheed"
- Michael Rene Walton as "Skeeter"
- Wylie Small as "Harmony"
- John Hennigan as "Razor"
- Melina Perez as Jade
- Darren Darnborough as "Ajax"
- Chase Austin as "Flash"
- Nicci Faires as Alexis
- Patrick Sweeney as Jimmy

== Production ==
20 Feet Below was based on director Clebanoff's 2009 web series The Darkness Descending.

== Release ==
20 Feet Below premiered at a fan launch party on July 20, 2013, at San Diego Comic-Con. Vertical Entertainment released the film on video on March 18, 2014.

== Reception ==
Mark L. Miller of Ain't It Cool News called it "predictable, passably to painfully acted, and dull in parts." HorrorNews.Net wrote, "The script is essentially one cliché after another strung together until they approximate something you might run into on the Lifetime channel".
