= Mystery Wrestling =

Canadian independent professional wrestling promotion

- Founded: 2023
- Style: Professional Wrestling; Hardcore wrestling Comedy Wrestling
- Headquarters: Gatineau, Quebec, Canada
- Founder(s): Evil Uno, Patrick Lozinski, Steven Boivin
- Owner(s): Evil Uno, Patrick Lozinski, Steven Boivin
- Website: mysterywrestling.com

Mystery Wrestling is a Canadian professional wrestling promotion founded by Evil Uno, Patrick Lozinski, and Steven Boivin. Based in Gatineau, Quebec, The promotion features events in which participating wrestlers and match cards are not announced in advance.

Mystery Wrestling launched in 2023. The promotion has presented live-streamed events through Twitch and YouTube, as well as live events across Canada and internationally. Mystery Wrestling has also participated in charity fundraising events in partnership with Fighting Back: Wrestling with Cancer and the Canadian Cancer Society, including the 2025 and 2026 events, both named The World's Longest Wrestling Match.

Since 2025, the promotion has gone from running shows in Gatineau, Quebec, Canada to holding events acrosss Canada and internationally in Japan and the United Kingdom.

== History ==
On April 30, 2023, Mystery Wrestling held its first livestreamed show, which was streamed on their Patreon page. On September 8, 2023, Mystery Wrestling held its third livestreamed event which featured Maki Itoh fighting against Emi Sakura in the main event. On January 19, 2025, Mystery Wrestling crowned its first world champion in a For All The Marbles tournament which featured Michael Oku, Stu Grayson, London Lightning, Cecil Nyx, Krule, and Psycho Mike and ended with Psycho Mike defeating Krule in the finals to become the inaugural Mystery Wrestling World Champion.

On August 11, 2025, Mystery Wrestling ran its first "World's Longest Wrestling Match", setting the world record. One month later on September 21, 2025, Mystery Wrestling made its debut in Toronto with Mystery Wrestling 18 at the Rec Room. On October 4, 2025, Mystery Wrestling held its first show outside of Canada when they made their Japan debut by teaming up with ChocoPro to present ChocoPro x Mystery Wrestling.

On January 17, 2026 and January 18, 2026, Mystery Wrestling made its United Kingdom debut at the Cathays Community Centre in Cardiff, Wales with Mystery Wrestling 21.5, being taped on January 17 and aired on the promotion's Patreon page on January 22, and Mystery Wrestling 21 which was streamed live on Twitch. On March 17, 2026 and March 18, 2026, Mystery Wrestling returned to Japan when they teamed up with Baka Gaijin + Friends and ChocoPro for a two-night tour in Tokyo.

On April 11, 2026 Mystery Wrestling held its first show in Vancouver at the Hastings Racecourse & Casino on the weekend of All Elite Wrestling's (AEW) Dynasty pay-per-view. This was followed up by a Tokyo Joshi Pro Wrestling (TJPW) show at the same venue on the same day.

On September 25, 2026, Evil Uno announced that Mystery Wrestling had signed more than 30 wrestlers to the promotion as part of a talent initiative program including interim MLP Canadian Champion Stu Grayson.

On November 5, 2026, Mystery Wrestling announced that their first show in South America would take place on March 20, 2026 at Teatro Roma in Santiago, Chile.

== World's longest wrestling match records ==
On August 11, 2025, Mystery Wrestling partnered with Fighting Back: Wrestling With Cancer, the Canadian Cancer Society, and Capital City Championship Combat (C4) to present "The World's Longest Wrestling Match", a live-streamed professional wrestling event held in support of cancer research and fundraising initiatives. The match lasted 21 hours, 49 minutes and 12 seconds and featured multiple wrestlers rotating throughout the match. According to reports, the event raised more than $30,000 for the Canadian Cancer Society. The event received coverage from several media outlets, including Fightful and POST Wrestling. This match set the record for longest professional wrestling match.

The event was held again in June 2026. Once again, the match broke the record for longest professional wrestling match; this time, it lasted 21 hours, 58 minutes, and 49 seconds.

== Championships ==
Championship	Current champion(s)	Reign	Date won	Days held	Location	Event	Notes	Ref.
Mystery Wrestling World Championship	Cool Ref	1	October 11, 2026	27+	Gatineau, Quebec, Canada	Mystery Wrestling 30		
