= Legend Quest (2011 TV series) =

- Genre: Live-action
- Starring: Ashley Cowie; Kinga Philipps
- Country of origin: United States
- Original language: English
- No. of seasons: 1
- No. of episodes: 6

Production
- Executive producers: John Brenkus; Mickey Stern
- Producers: Kinga Philipps; Dwight D. Smith (consulting); Michael Agbabian (consulting); Ashley Cowie
- Editors: Alex Dollins; David Handman; Bryan King; Matt Miller; Ryan Philander; Eric Scott
- Camera setup: Multiple-camera
- Production companies: Realand Productions; Thunder Road Productions, LLC; Universal Networks International

Original release
- Network: SyFy
- Release: July 13 – August 17, 2011

Legend Quest is an American adventure television series that premiered on July 13, 2011, on the SyFy channel. The series follows historian and adventure-seeker Ashley Cowie in his quest to crack the code on his hunt for the most powerful lost treasures in the world. On March 12, 2012, TVWise reported that the series has been cancelled by Syfy.

== Plot summary ==
In the introduction, Cowie states:

My name is Ashley Cowie. I'm an author and archaeologist explorer specializing in ancient symbols and mysterious legends. I've spent years studying some of the world's most fascinating relics. Now I'm on the hunt to find where they are. Some would hope that these secrets remain hidden but I'll leave no stone unturned to uncover the truth in my..."Legend Quest".

== Team ==
- Ashley Cowie (Host/Conspiracy Theorist)
- Kinga Philipps (Field producer)
- Paul "Crusher" Peddinghaus (Cameraman/D.O.P.)
- José Gonzalez (Spanish translator/cameraman)
- Jeremy Dell'ova (Cameraman/sound)

== Episodes ==
No.	Title	Original release date
1	"Ark of the Covenant/Mayan Talking Cross"	July 13, 2011
In the series premiere, historian and adventurer Ashley Cowie and his team of explorers search for the Ark of the Covenant in Lalibela, Ethiopia and the Mayan Talking Cross of the jungles in South America.
2	"Excalibur/Lost Cintamani Stone"	July 20, 2011
Ashley and his team go on a grand adventure searching for the King Arthur's legendary sword, Excalibur in Shropshire, England, Palermo, Sicily, Ostuni, Italy, and Marne-la-Vallée, France. Next, Ashley's off to the Philippines in search of the Hindu and Buddhist legend of the lost Cintamani Stone which is said to grant wishes to those who possess it and has to dive in the crater of a former volcano, Lake Taal.
3	"Holy Lance/Incan Golden Sun Disc"	July 27, 2011
The team searches for the Holy Lance of Longinus (aka The Spear of Destiny) in Europe which is reputed to have been used at the Crucifixion of Jesus. Then they travel to Peru searching for a golden disc in the Peruvian mountains to look into its legend of whoever possesses the disc can allegedly stop time.
4	"Staff of Moses/The Stone of Destiny"	August 3, 2011
Ashley and his team travel to in Israel in search for clues about the staff of Moses. Next, they try to discover the Stone of Destiny's true location in Scotland.
5	"Merlin's Magical Treasures/King Solomon's Ring"	August 10, 2011
Ashley and his team search the U.K. for treasures said to have been hidden away by Merlin, the most famous sorcerer. Then they attempt to find the magical signet ring of King Solomon, which is said to give its wearer the ability to command the djinn and understand the speech of animals.
6	"Holy Grail"	August 17, 2011
Ashley and his team go after one of the biggest legends of the Middle Ages, the Holy Grail, thought to be the cup used by Christ at the Last Supper.

== Fabrication of shots/locations ==
In Season 1, Episode 3, during the search for The Holy Lance, the team claims to have gone to Area 51 before deciding they could not gain entry and ultimately abandoning the search. However, it has been pointed out that the unoccupied guard house that Ashley and Kinga are filmed in front of is not the entrance to Area 51 and that they, in fact, fabricated the shot from another location.

== See also ==
- MonsterQuest
- MysteryQuest
- Treasure Quest
