= LegendQuest =

1991 fantasy role-playing game

- Designers: John Josten
- Illustrators: Alain Alajajain; Damian Daniels; Jeff DeLance; John Josten; Daniel Maheu; Robert Pucillo; Jodi Pucillo; Dan Schwarten
- Publishers: Board Enterprises
- Publication: 1991
- Genres: Fantasy

LegendQuest is a fantasy role-playing game published by Board Enterprises in 1991 .

== Description ==
LegendQuest is a fantasy role-playing game with a point-based system for character creation. Unlike older role-playing games like Dungeons & Dragons in which players must pick a character class, in this game each player is given 250 points to spend on attributes, skills, and money. Attributes include Strength, Knowledge, Endurance, Wisdom, Appearance, and Psyche. Skills are taken from a long list; some skills are grouped together, such as "Sword Skills", while others are grouped into a genre such as "sword", "axe", etc. Any points left over define the character's starting money with which to buy equipment. Critic Dike Dejong noted that this game avoids the "trap of rigid and often artificial character classes ... [allowing] you to tailormake characters to your specifications. If you want a soldier who happens to know a little magic, no problem. Or a mage who's wicked with a sword." The one classic "class" not included in the character creation rules is the cleric, because the designers wanted to prevent miracles from interfering with a good storyline.

The rule book also has advice for the gamemaster, but does not include a campaign setting or any adventures.

=== Skill resolution ===
Skill resolution is based on a percentile dice roll to which the relevant attribute, multiplied by 10, and each level of the relevant skill, multiplied by five, is added. The sum must be equal to or greater than the target number to achieve success. A character can choose to hold back all of their skill so as to husband some for later.

=== Movement ===
Movement is defined in four categories: free movement, walking, running, and sprinting. Agility and Endurance define the distance a character can travel at each rate, modified by any Running skill.

=== Combat ===
Combat uses the same skill resolution system. During a fight, participants will suffer from fatigue, which will affect initiative and other penalties. There are also special rules including fighting in the dark, attempting to disarm opponents, and fighting from horseback.

Defensive maneuvers include parrying, dodging, and fending.

=== Magic ===
After buying the a magical genre — Conjuring, Druid, Healer, Illusion, Necromancer, Sorcery, or Bard — magical spells can also be purchased during character creation. Control levels can also be purchased during character creation. At the most basic level, any spell has a minimum effect, range, and area. Buying more Control levels can boost the power of a spell.

== Publication history ==
LegendQuest was designed by John Josten and was published by Board Enterprises in 1991 as a mimeographed 112-page book of 3-hole punched papers gathered into a binder, with small black & white illustrations. This was immediately followed by a second edition released as a perfect bound softcover book with a colour cover and artwork by Alain Alajajain, Damian Daniels, Jeff DeLance, John Josten, Daniel Maheu, Robert Pucillo, Jodi Pucillo, and Dan Schwarten.

Board Enterprises published a number of adventures that included The Endless Dungeons series. A number of supplements were also published, including a campaign setting described in the City of Rhum series.

== Reception ==
In Issue 196 of Dragon (July 1993), Lester Smith noted that this game did not look professional — he called the first edition "probably the very first product of a group of gaming buddies", and the second edition "still toward the low end of [the professional] spectrum — but nonetheless found the game contents "quite impressive. Building upon a fairly simple set of basic mechanics, it delivers a surprisingly wide-ranging and flexible yet detailed set of rules within a relatively short number of pages." Smith also found the text "well organized and clearly written, with helpful examples in all the needful places." Smith was impressed by the game system, but found a few problems, most notably that neither a campaign world nor advice on how to build a campaign world were included. Smith also found the number of things to keep track of and add up during combat "can be troublesome." Smith suggested that changing the percentile dice system to a d20 system (using twenty-sided dice) would make everything much easier. Despite these problems, Smith concluded on a positive note, saying, "Gamers who like full control in designing their characters from scratch, and those who like combat systems that are tactical without burying themselves in minutiae, should find it well to their liking, as long as they don't mind dealing with a fair amount of double-digit addition. People who like wide-ranging, flexible magic systems will be pleased with the game as well."

In Issue 15 of Shadis, Dirk Dejong liked the flexibility of the character creation system, but noted that "you really need to make three or four characters before getting it right." Dejong also liked the cheapness of the game and its ease of use, saying, "On the plus side of the balance ledger, Legend Quest doesn't require a large investment in dollars or time to become proficient, and is uniquely suited for first-time players, or those who've gotten burned out on mega-systems. It includes a decent monster list and an interesting system for mentalism." Dejong also liked the combat system, calling it "simple yet effective", and found the magic system "highly flexible." Dejong felt the game's major deficiencies were the absence of clerics from the game, and also the lack of a campaign setting. Dejong concluded by saying, "I give Legend Quest a big thumbs-up. It simply succeeds, where too many others don't, in providing a simple, easy-to-play fantasy RPG at a reasonable cost. For those just starting into RPGs, or who've been burned out by games that require ten to twenty books and more money than your college tuition, Legend Quest could be the fast, easy fix you've been looking for.
