= Brazilian Wrestling Federation =

Brazilian professional wrestling association

- Acronym: BWF
- Founded: 2002
- Style: Professional wrestling Sports entertainment Telecatch
- Headquarters: São Paulo, São Paulo state, Brazil
- Founder: Bob Jr.
- Owner: Bob Jr.
- Website: bwf.com.br

Brazilian Wrestling Federation (BWF) is a Brazilian professional wrestling association, the largest in the country. The federation holds one television and internet show, BWF Telecatch, at Rede Bandeirantes. The company was founded by former Telecatch wrestler Bob Júnior with the mission to revive the popularity of Pro Wrestling and Telecatch in Brazil. The BWF also operates a professional wrestling school, responsible for the development and training of new wrestlers.

== History ==
The BWF was founded in 2002 by Bob Júnior—son of professional wrestler Bob Léo—with the aim of reviving professional wrestling in Brazil, a sport that had lost popularity following the decline of telecatch. Before the federation was created, Bob Júnior had already made history in Brazilian wrestling television, appearing on the show Campeões do Ringue ("Champions of the Ring"), broadcast by Rede Record between 1997 and 1998. The federation's creation was influenced by the model of the then-World Wrestling Federation (WWF), which Bob Júnior had discovered through the program Supercatch, aired on Rede Manchete in 1994, where his father, Bob Léo served as the color commentator. According to Bob Júnior, the BWF sought to adapt elements of the North American professional wrestling model to the Brazilian context while retaining references to the national tradition. This model differed from the traditional telecatch circuit, which was historically associated with performances in circuses, smaller venues, and television programs, generally with straightforward storylines, stereotypical gimmicks and simpler face-versus-heel dynamics, by incorporating a structure featuring championships, tournaments, new rules, match stipulations, and more structured storylines, more similar to North American professional wrestling. Bob Júnior also established a professional wrestling school, which became an important for developing new wrestlers. The facility helped train wrestlers who went on to compete on national and international circuits, contributing to the renewal of the BWF roster and the development of a new generation of practitioners of the sport in Brazil.

The first televised program was produced in 2007 with BWF Combate on AllTV (an internet-based television channel) and the internet; a professional wrestling news and discussion show to cover developments in Brazilian and international professional wrestling. In 2009, BWF launched its second television program, BWF Telecatch, which aired on public-access TV Aberta and TV Guarulhos. It is BWF's flagship program, featuring its wrestling cards. In 2012, BWF Telecatch began airing on NET Cidade, on NET channel 20. The play-by-play announcer is Renato Dias, and the commentator is JP Borges.

The company was the first Brazilian wrestling promotion to reportedly support a wrestler to compete outside the country. Female wrestler Bia fought under the name Bianca in a match at Combat Zone Wrestling (CZW) in 2003 alongside Sabian, fighting Joker and Mercedez Martinez.

2011 was a particularly important year for the BWF, as the promotion started participated of the Virada Cultural festival in São Paulo, sharing the event's professional wrestling program with Mexico's Consejo Mundial de Lucha Libre (CMLL), which was featured as the festival's main wrestling attraction. BWF became one of the festival's yearly attractions ever since. In the same year, BWF also participated in the Anime Friends convention, an event where it holds wrestling matches, workshops, and other wrestling-related activities. The event featured an exclusive title, the Anime Friends Cup, which was contested between 2011 and 2017. In 2011, the BWF launched the Terremoto ("Earthquake") Royal Rumble match, held during the 2011 Anime Friends event. Following the death of Pirata Alma Negra—the winner of the inaugural edition—the BWF revamped the competition and renamed it Maremoto ("Seaquake") in his honor. The first edition under the new name took place in 2012, with Mozart emerging as the winner.

In 2012, BWF became a stage of the “Torneio Sul-Americano de Luta Livre” (South American Wrestling Tournament) and in its first year brought international wrestlers like Super Crazy and Zumbi to Brazil. Since 2013, BWF has been more visible in the media. That year the company announced the participation of KENTA, Eddie Edwards, Naomichi Marufuji, Taiji Ishimori and other international wrestlers for the "Torneio Latino Americano de Luta Livre" (Latin American Wrestling Tournament).

In 2014, Bob Júnior appeared alongside UFC champion Anderson Silva on The Noite com Danilo Gentili, a talk show broadcast by SBT, on March 26 of that year. On that occasion, Bob Júnior and BWF wrestlers participated in a professional wrestling demonstration with Danilo Gentili, while Anderson Silva provided commentary on the match. On November 13, 2017, Bob Júnior returned to the show accompanied by former WWE wrestlers Juventud Guerrera and Carlito to discuss the history of professional wrestling and Portuguese promotion World Stars of Wrestling's (WSW) tour of Brazil.

On April 27, 2014 BWF debuted a special event called "Convocado Para Lutar" (Called to Fight) that was attended by William Regal and Director of Development Canyon Ceman as part of the assessment of BWF wrestlers for a tryout in WWE.

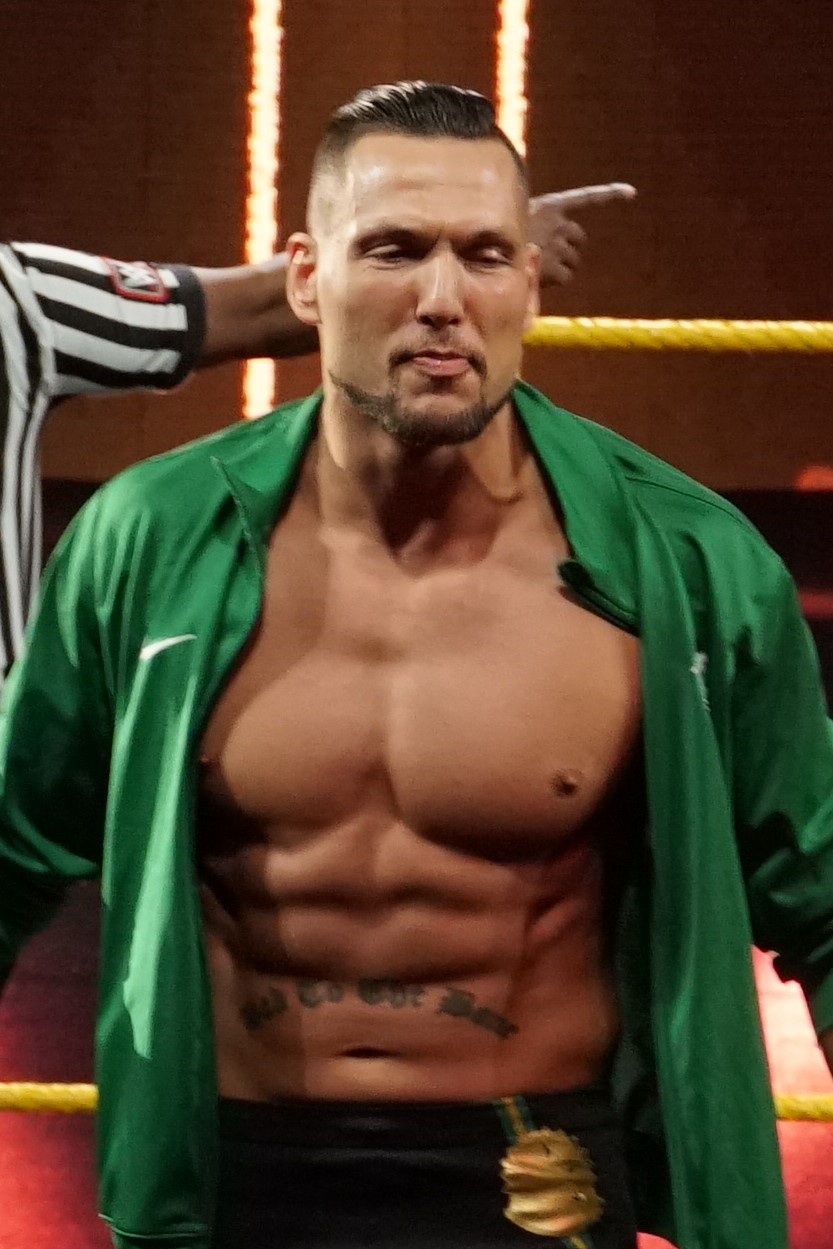
Cezar Bononi started his career at BWF, he held the BWF Rei Do Ringue Championship title in 2015

In 2014 at Anime Friends convention, they announced the debut of BWF Rookies, a developmental division whose group of young talents would form the "new wrestlers" division. In 2015, a new tournament called "Backyard Arena" was presented, and bring some Brazilian independent wrestlers to fight for a BWF contract. The winner of tournament was Death Rider. In the same year, Cezar Bononi, which competed under the ring name of V8 Big Block and held the BWF Rei Do Ringue Championship once, was recruited into WWE NXT and debuted in 2017 against Aleister Black.

In 2019, BWF partnered with MMA promotion SFT to transmit their programming in Rede Bandeirantes, having now national reach. It was broadcast as SFT Pro-Wrestling on Band; further editions were planned but were halted due to the COVID-19 pandemic. At this time BWF adopted a six-sided wrestling ring similar to American promotion Total Nonstop Action Wrestling (TNA). Subsequently, BWF began having its matches broadcast on the subscription channel BandSports, and in 2024, their events started airing on both BandSports and the free-to-air Band channel. The program is known as BWF Telecatch na Band. In 2024, the São Paulo City Hall allocated R$ 650,000 to BWF—via municipal parliamentary amendments—to host events.

With the support of new public partnerships and broadcasting and distribution agreements, such as those signed with Band and the City of São Paulo, BWF expanded its production structure and began holding events in larger venues, as well as experimenting with new fight stipulations never before seen in Brazil. Among them was a Ladder Match on May 20, 2023, which pitted then-champion Acce against Victor Boer, Adam Black, Raio Negro, and Taylor Skinner, with the goal of reaching the belt suspended above the ring and winning the King of the Ring title (with Acce's victory). And an Ambulance Match, on September 7, 2024, which was part of the rivalry between Yan Karlor and Raio Negro, former tag team partners who became rivals after the team split up. In this match, the objective was to put the opponent inside an ambulance and close its doors, with Raio Negro winning.

On July 12, 2026, the BWF announced on its social media accounts a partnership with New Japan Pro Wrestling (NJPW) to bring talent from the Japanese company to appear at BWF events. The first appearance by an NJPW wrestler was announced for August 8, 2026, during the tapings of BWF Telecatch at the Mané Garrincha Gymnasium in the South Zone of São Paulo (SP). It was a match between NJPW's KUSHIDA and BWF Tag Team Champion and BWF Supremo Champion Victor Boer, with Boer winning by disqualification after a run in by Yan Karlor. The match was followed by a tag team match of KUSHIDA and Yan Karlor vs. Victor Boer and Toko.

== Championships and accomplishments ==
=== Championship Belts ===
- BWF Brazilian Championship
- BWF King of the Ring
- BWF Tag Team Championship
- BWF South American Championship
- BWF Supreme Champion
- BWF Internet Championship
- BWF Maremoto — An annual Royal Rumble-style match event; the winner earns the right to challenge for a title held by another champion.
- Survivor Championship — A category contested exclusively in Triple Threat Matches, where three wrestlers compete against one another for the title.
- BWF Rookies Championship

=== Retired Titles: ===
- Anime Friends Cup (2011—2017)
- Arena Backyard Wrestling Championship (2015—2019)

=== Tournaments: ===
- BWF Rookies Title Tournament (2026)
- BWF Supreme Title Tournament (2025)
- Tournament for a Shot at the BWF Tag Team Titles (2024)
- FITCH Tournament — International Telecatch Festival (2023)
- BWF South American Title Tournament (2020)
- BWF Tag Team Title Tournament (2017)
- Latin American Lucha Libre Tournament 2014
- Latin American Lucha Libre Tournament 2013

== Current champions ==
Title	Champion	Date won	Location	Previous	Ref
Campeonato Brasileiro	Allan Sales	September 19, 2026	CE Mooca, São Paulo	Nocaute Jack	
Campeonato Sul-Americano	Adam Black	September 19, 2026	Virada Cultural 2013, São Paulo	Kaiser	
Sobrevivente	Adolfo Bogard	July 17, 2016	Campo de Marte, São Paulo	Rurik Jr.	
Rei do Ringue	Yan Karlor	May 1, 2016	Campo de Marte, São Paulo	Vacant	
Copa Anime Friends	Dinamo "O Jovem Fênix"	December 20, 2015	Unicsul, São Paulo	Beto "Anjo Loiro"	
Campeonato de Duplas	The Top Tier (Victor Boer & Acce)	September 7, 2015	Ginásio 7 de Setembro, São Paulo	Max Miller & O Aniquilador Dante	
Campeonato Internet	Angel Blake	December 10, 2016	CE Mooca, São Paulo	Rapha Luque	
Arena Backyard	Thuro Thuro	July 10, 2016	Campo de Marte, São Paulo	Zanza	
Guerra das Tribos	Rocha, Death Rider e D’Angelo	September 7, 2015	Ginásio 7 de Setembro, São Paulo	Evan Fox, Tubarão Negro e Dillios "Espartano"	
Maremoto	Rocha, O Maquiavélico	July 15, 2012	Ginásio 7 de Setembro, São Paulo	Various wrestlers	

== Roster ==
Name
Acce
Beto "Anjo Loiro"
Big Boy
Bob Jr.
Death Rider
El Vuante
"Espartano" Dillios
"Estrela Dourada" Solly
Evan Fox
Fred Turbo
Insano Igor
Kabal
Matths
Maverick
Max Miller
Michael Fury
Nocaut Jack
"O Aniquilador" Dante
"O Capoeirista" Kid Abelha
"O Guerrilheiro" Robson Cruz
"O Jovem Fênix" Dinamo
O Maestro
O Nomade Touaregue
"O Rockstar" Blackout
"O Sem Noção" Kadu
"O Sensacional" Victor Boer
"O Superstar" Rapha Luque
Sonico
Speed
"Tenacious" Tim Anderson
Toko "Infernal"
Tubarão Negro

== See also ==
- List of professional wrestling promotions in South America
