= Aquiles (wrestler) =

Aquiles is a brazilian fighter

Vespaciano Félix de Oliveira was a memorable fighter from the Brazilian Telecatch using his pseudonym: “Aquiles”.

== Career ==
Vespaciano started his boxing career, training at Benjamin Ruta's gym, but soon moved to Telecatch, when he met Cangaceiro, ex-fighter and ex-trainer. Initially, as a "dirty" fighter, his nickname was "The Terrible", but one incident changed him: during a fight in the 1960s, “Aquiles” (literally) killed his opponent. From then on his nickname changed to what remained throughout his career as a fighter: "The Killer".

Aquiles acted between the 1960s and 1980s. The broadcasters that broadcast his struggles at the time were: Tupi, Excelsior, Bandeirantes, Globo, Record and Gazeta.

Retired from the fights, Vespaciano was still a physical education teacher and a member of the Sports Commission of the Tabatinga City Hall - sp1. Retired, he is an evangelical singer.
