= Lucha libre =

Mexican-style professional wrestling

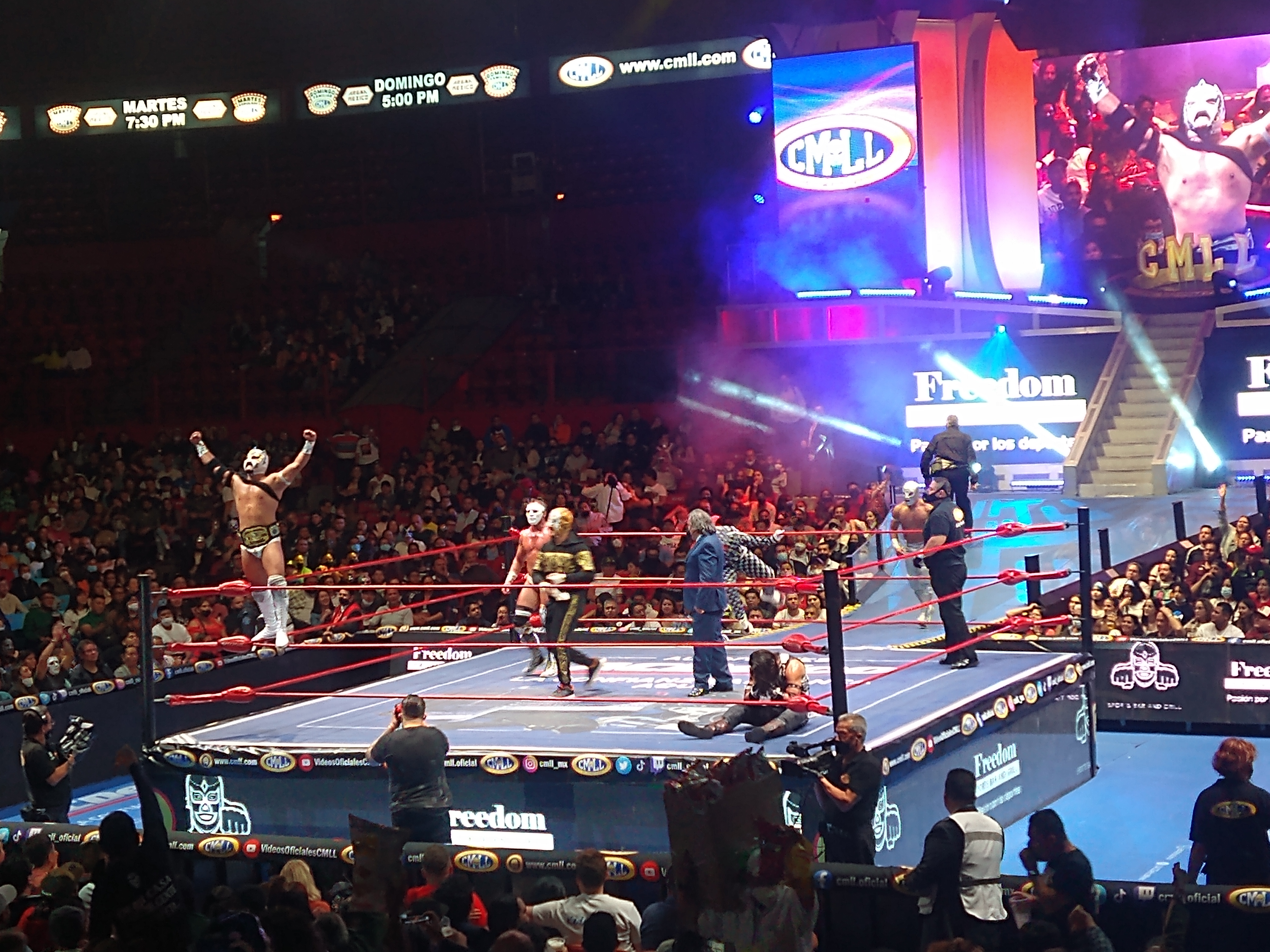
Consejo Mundial de Lucha Libre event, 2022

Lucha libre (Spanish pronunciation: [ˈlutʃa ˈliβɾe], meaning "freestyle wrestling" or more literally translated as "free wrestling" and "free fighting") is the term for the style of professional wrestling originating in Mexico. Since its introduction to Mexico in the early 20th century, it has developed into a unique form of the genre, characterized by colorful masks, rapid sequences of holds and maneuvers, and high-flying aerial techniques, some of which have been adopted by wrestlers in the United States, Japan, and elsewhere. The wearing of masks has developed special significance, and matches are sometimes contested in which the loser must permanently remove his mask, which is a wager with a high degree of weight attached. Tag team wrestling is especially prevalent in lucha libre, particularly matches with three-member teams, called trios.

Although in English the term specifically refers to the Mexican style of theatrical professional wrestling, in Mexico (and certain other Spanish-speaking territories) it can refer to other kinds of wrestling, including competitive amateur wrestling (lucha libre olímpica) and professional wrestling in general (lucha libre profesional)—the latter used as an abbreviation— in addition to itself Mexican professional wrestling in particular (lucha libre mexicana). However, in Spain (as well as with certain other Spanish-speaking territories and non-Anglophone European countries) professional wrestling is known as "catch".

Male lucha libre wrestlers are known as luchadores (singular luchador) while female lucha libre wrestlers are known as luchadoras (singular luchadora). Mexican wrestlers often come from extended wrestling families, who often form their own stables. One such familial line integrated to the United States professional wrestling scene is the Guerreros.

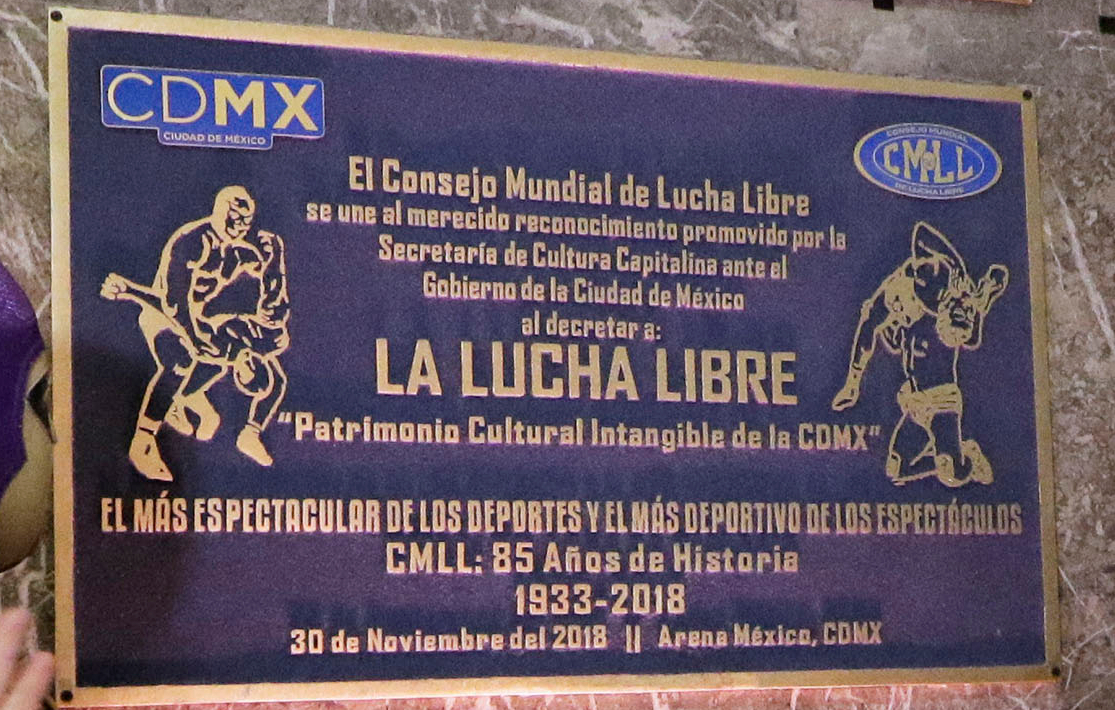
Plaque commemorating the recognition of lucha libre as an intangible cultural heritage by Mexico City and CMLL.

In 2018, Mexican lucha libre was declared an intangible cultural heritage of Mexico City by the head of the Government of Mexico City.

== Distinguishing characteristics ==
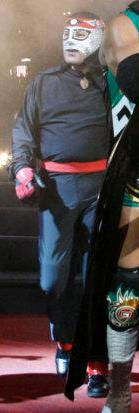
Growing up, Mexican middleweight luchador Octagón was mainly interested in martial arts and earned a black belt in Shotokan karate.

Mexican luchadores are traditionally more agile and perform more aerial maneuvers than American professional wrestlers, who more often rely on power and hard strikes to subdue their opponents. The difference in styles is due to the independent evolution of professional wrestling in Mexico beginning in the 1930s and the fact that luchadores in cruiserweight divisions (Peso Crucero) and other lower weight divisions are often more popular in Mexican lucha libre than heavyweights. Luchadores execute characteristic high-flying attacks by using the wrestling ring's ropes to catapult themselves towards their opponents, using intricate combinations in rapid-fire succession, and applying complex submission holds known as llaves. Rings used in lucha libre (which are typically squared shaped, though some lucha libre promotions use hexagonal rings) generally lack the spring supports added to U.S. and Japanese rings; as a result, lucha libre does not emphasize "flat back bumps" like in other professional wrestling styles. For this same reason, aerial maneuvers are almost always performed on opponents outside the ring, allowing the luchador to break his fall with an acrobatic tumble.

Lucha libre has several different weight classes, many catered to smaller agile wrestlers, who often make their debuts in their mid-teens. This enabled dynamic high-flying luchadores such as Rey Misterio Jr., Juventud Guerrera, Super Crazy, and Místico among others, to develop years of experience by their mid-twenties. A number of prominent Japanese wrestlers also started their careers training in Mexico and competing in lucha libre's lighter weight classes before becoming stars in Japan. These wrestlers included Gran Hamada, Satoru Sayama, Jushin Thunder Liger, Último Dragón, and Kazuchika Okada among others.

Lucha libre is also known for its tag team wrestling matches. The teams are often made up of three or four members, instead of two as is common in the United States. Three-man teams participate in what are called trios matches while four-man teams participate in Atómicos matches. Of the team members, one member is often designated the captain. A successful fall in a multi-person tag team match can be achieved by either pinning the captain of the opposing team or by pinning both of the other members. A referee can also stop the match because of "excessive punishment" and he can then award the match to the victim of the "excessive punishment". Falls often occur simultaneously, which adds to the extremely stylized nature of the action. In addition, a wrestler can opt to roll out of the ring in lieu of tagging a partner or simply be knocked out of the ring, at which point one of his partners may enter. As a result, the tag team formula and pacing which has developed in U.S. tag matches is different from lucha libre because the race to tag is not a priority. There are also traditional two-man tag matches (known as parejas matches) and other types of team matches.

=== Masks ===
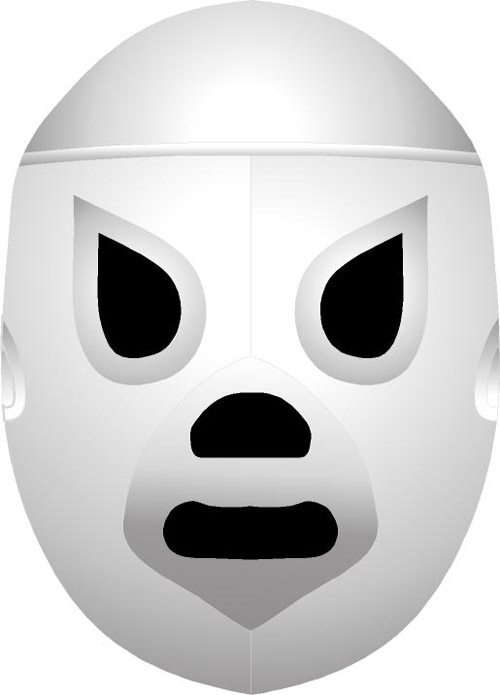
The mask of El Santo, one of the most famous masks in Mexican lucha libre

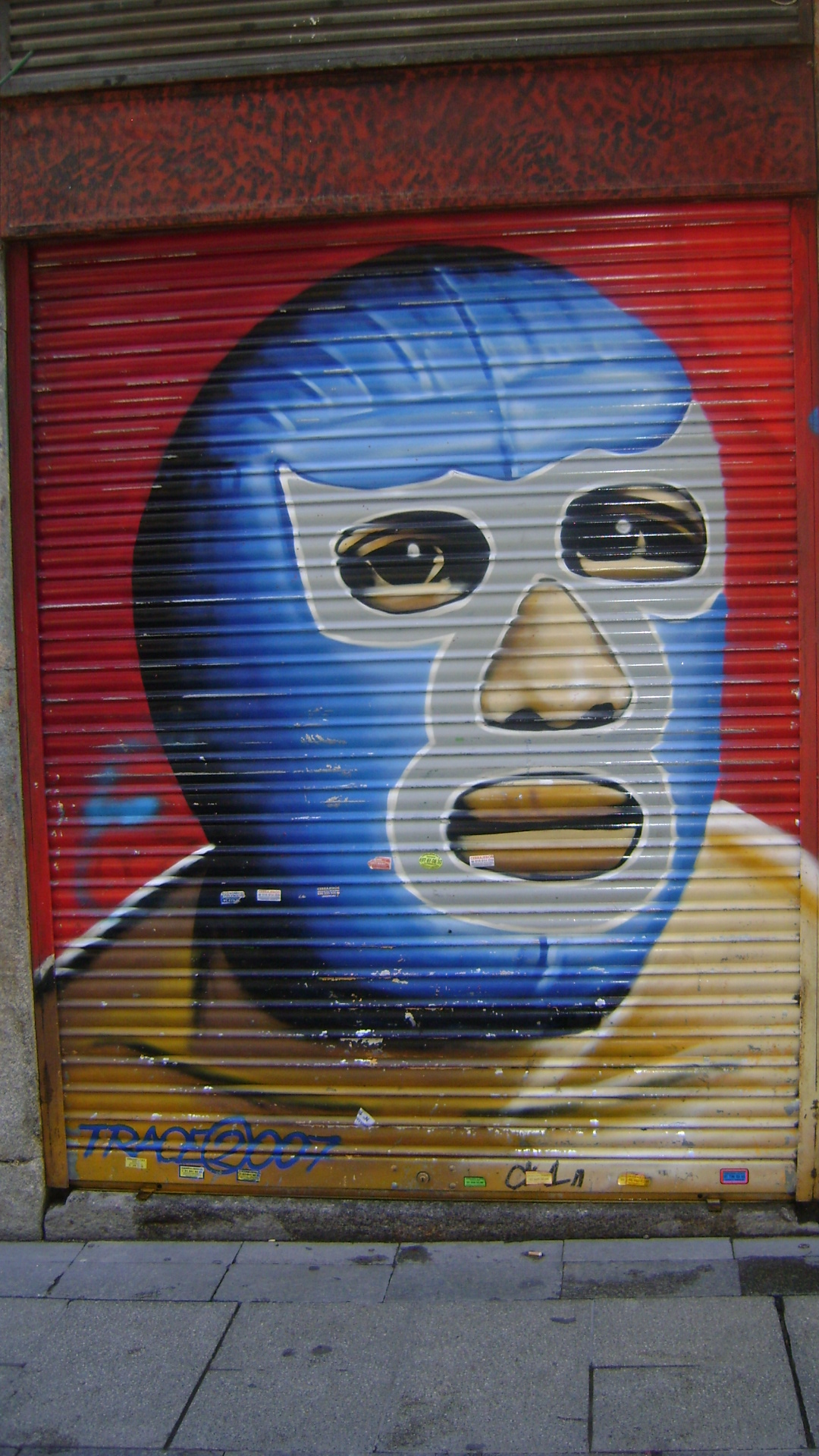
Graffiti of Blue Demon's mask in Madrid, Spain

Masks (máscaras) have been used dating back to the beginnings of lucha libre in the early part of the 20th century, and have a historical significance to Mexico in general, dating to the days of the Aztecs. Early masks were very simple with basic colors to distinguish the wrestler. In modern lucha libre, masks are colorfully designed to evoke the images of animals, gods, ancient heroes and other archetypes, whose identity the luchador takes on during a performance. Virtually all wrestlers in Mexico will start their careers wearing masks, but over the span of their careers, a large number of them will be unmasked. Sometimes, a wrestler slated for retirement will be unmasked in his final bout or at the beginning of a final tour, signifying a loss of identity as that character. Sometimes, losing the mask signifies the end of a gimmick with the wrestler moving on to a new gimmick and mask. The mask is considered sacred to a degree, so much so that fully removing an opponent's mask during a match is grounds for disqualification.

Masked luchadores will go to great lengths to conceal their true identities; in effect, the mask is synonymous with the luchador. El Santo continued wearing his mask after retirement, revealing his face only briefly in old age, and was eventually buried wearing his silver mask.

More recently, the masks luchadores wear have become iconic symbols of Mexican culture. Contemporary artists like Francisco Delgado and Xavier Garza incorporate wrestler masks in their paintings.

Although masks are a prominent feature of lucha libre, it is a misconception that every Mexican wrestler uses one. There have been several maskless wrestlers who have been successful, particularly Tarzán López, Gory Guerrero, Perro Aguayo, and Negro Casas. Formerly masked wrestlers who lost their masks, such as El Satánico, Cien Caras, Cibernético and others, have had continued success despite losing their masks.

=== Luchas de Apuestas ===
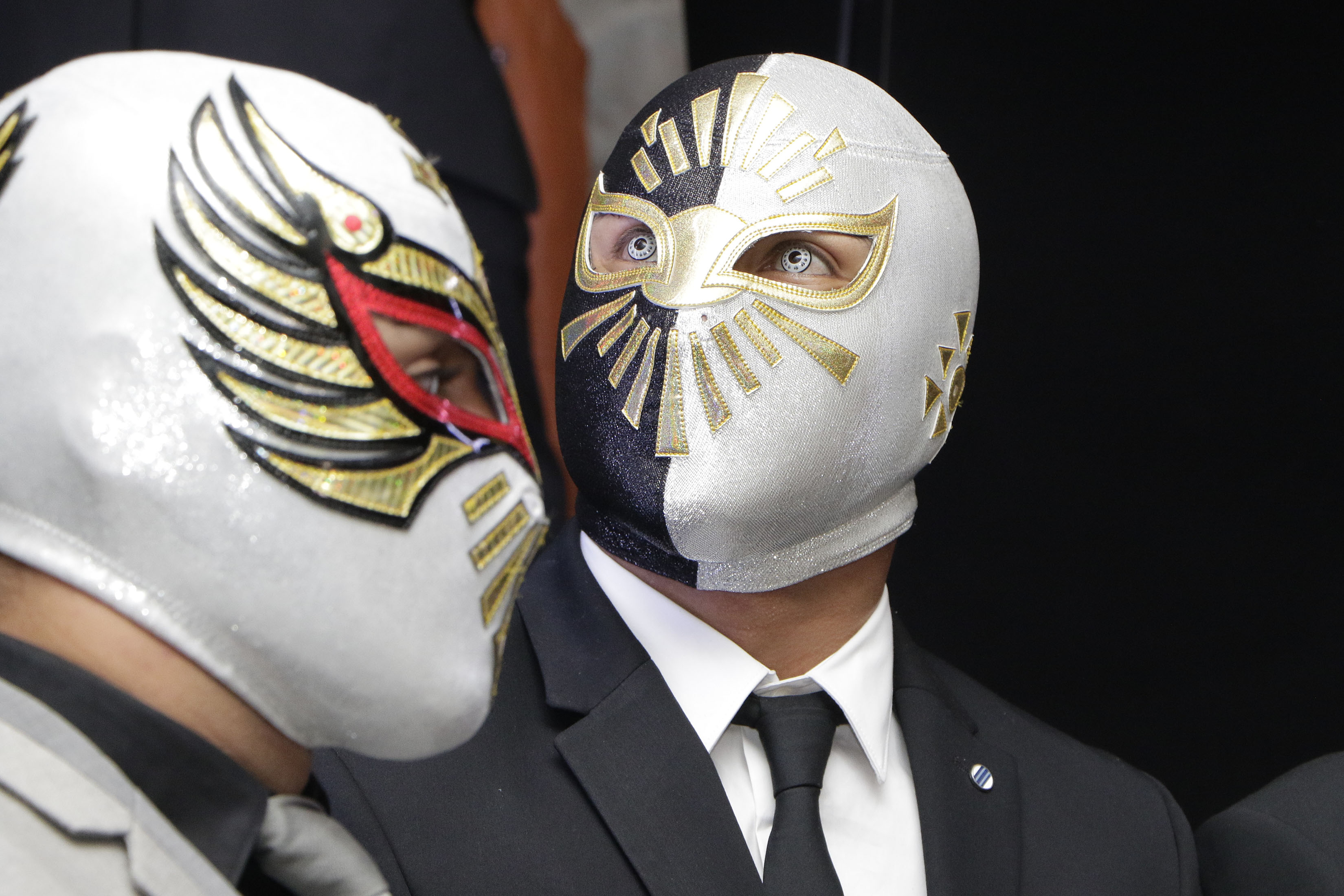
Masked luchadores Carístico (also known as Sin Cara) and Místico (also known as Dralístico) in Mexico City

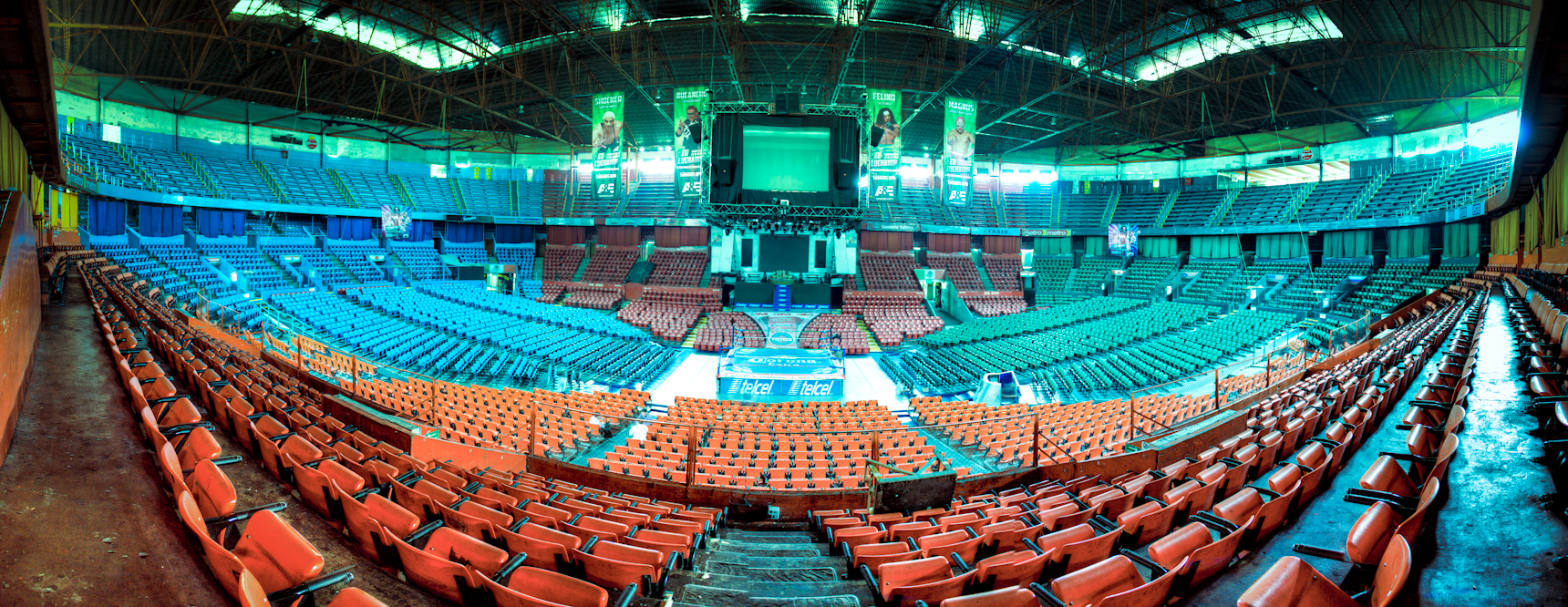
An empty Arena México configured for lucha libre

With the importance placed on masks in lucha libre, losing one's mask to an opponent is seen as the ultimate insult, and can at times seriously hurt the career of the unmasked wrestler. Putting one's mask on the line against a hated opponent is a tradition in lucha libre as a means to settle a heated feud between two or more wrestlers. In these matches, called luchas de apuestas ("wager matches" or "betting fights"), the wrestlers "wager" either their mask, their hair, or another valuable like money or their career.

In a lucha de apuesta, wrestlers make a public bet on the outcome of the match. The most common forms are the mask-against-mask, hair-against-hair, or mask-against-hair matches. A wrestler who loses his or her mask has to remove the mask after the match. A wrestler who loses their hair is shaved immediately afterward. Usually the true identity of a masked wrestler is previously unknown, thus, it is customary for that person to reveal their real name, hometown, and years as a professional wrestler upon unmasking.

Masked wrestlers first appeared in Mexico somewhere around the 1920s, in imitation of the covered roosters in cockfighting, and became widespread in the country in the 1930s after the arrival of popular masked American wrestler La Maravilla Enmascarada. During the early years of lucha libre, people could bet on the known wrestler or on the covered one; at the end of the match, the covered one would be revealed and people could see which luchador it was. Promoters soon discovered that mystery was very attractive for the audience, and opted to keep the secret or to sell that the masked wrestler would reveal himself only if he was defeated. These weren't luchas de apuestas in the proper sense, since there weren't any bets on the line among the luchadores. These were generally covered wrestlers that usually revealed themselves at the end of the night or after a few shows. However, luchadores increasingly became conscious of the expectation their secret identity set for the audiences, and gradually chose to keep their identities secret for longer. They also began to adopt masked gimmicks to differentiate themselves among the growing number of wrestlers.

One of the first lucha de apuestas (i.e. two wrestlers with a bet on the line) was presented on July 14, 1940, at Arena México. A masked middleweight wrestler, El Murciélago Enmascarado, was so much lighter than his opponent Octavio Gaona, he requested a further condition before he would sign a contract to face him: Octavio Gaona would have to put his hair on the line in exchange for his mask. Gaona won the match and Murciélago was forced to unmask, helping to give birth to the tradition.

The following match types are variants of luchas de apuestas with different types of wagers:

- Máscara contra Máscara (mask versus mask): In this match, two masked luchadores engage in a high-stakes confrontation where the wager involves their masks. The outcome dictates that the losing wrestler is ceremoniously unmasked by the winning opponent and must reveal his/her identity (usually the face and name of masked wrestlers are kept secret). The act of unmasking a wrestler often serves as a significant catalyst for the winner's career advancement and have the opposite effect for the loser. The most notable example is the 1952 match in which El Santo gained the mask of Black Shadow, which cemented Santo as one of the biggest stars in lucha libre and established professional wrestling as a cultural phenomenon in Mexico. Another notable example occurred in 2000, when Villano III lost his mask to Atlantis, which some considered the best lucha libre match in history. Also noteworthy was the family feud between Ray Mendoza's sons and Juan Alvarado Ibarra's sons, which led to a 1988 triple mask bet between Villano I, Villano IV, and Villano V (sons of Ray Mendoza) against El Brazo, Brazo de Oro, and Brazo de Plata (sons of Juan Alvarado Ibarra); the Villanos won the masks of the Alvarado brothers. On March 30, 2026, AAA presented an unusual Máscara contra Máscara where the audience knew who both luchadores were under the mask. El Grande Americano vs. "The Original" El Grande Americano quickly became the hottest feud in Mexico after its spark at the 2026 edition of WWE's Royal Rumble. Their match at Noche de Los Grandes was widely praised as one of the best modern lucha de apuestas.
- Máscara contra Cabellera (mask versus hair): In this variant, a masked wrestler and an unmasked one compete. If the masked luchador wins, the unmasked luchador shaves his head as a sign of humiliation. If the unmasked luchador wins, he keeps his hair and the loser is unmasked. These matches are infrequent because masked wrestlers are usually reluctant to bet their masks against hair, as masks are a more appreciated trophy, unmasking often results in a decrease in popularity for the wrestler, and a masked wrestler usually loses his mask just once, while unmasked wrestlers can be shaved many times. The most common result of these matches is the masked wrestler winning the hair of the unmasked one, but there are notable exceptions. Perro Aguayo never adopted a masked gimmick and was very successful in wager matches, unmasking important wrestlers like Konnan, Máscara Año 2000, and Stuka. Aguayo's hair was a trophy so coveted by legends that El Solitario, El Santo, and Villano III each successfully bet their masks to win it. Another important hair was from Cavernario Galindo, a legendary unmasked wrestler from the golden age of Mexican lucha libre, who, like Aguayo, never wrestled masked. Though Galindo never won a mask, he was respected enough that the two most important wrestlers in Mexican history, El Santo and Blue Demon, risked their identities to win his hair. Perhaps the most well-known match was the tag team lucha de apuestas between Hijo del Santo and Octagón (Masks) vs The "gringos locos" (Eddie Guerrero and Art Barr) (hair) .
- Cabellera contra Cabellera (hair versus hair): In this match the loser has his head shaved. These matches are very common and do not command the interest and expectation of mask wagers. However, there are wrestlers who gained notice via these matches. Examples are El Satánico, Negro Casas, Perro Aguayo, and Villano III. Noteworthy was the feud between El Dandy and El Satánico which led to a long-run storyline of hair vs. hair matches. A curious example is the 2012 match between Blue Panther and Negro Casas which ended with a draw and both heads were shaved.
- Apuestas al Revés (reverse bet): This is a controversial variant of wager matches, where two masked wrestlers bet their hair. The competitors either wear a modified version of their mask which shows their hair, or the loser must remove their mask enough to allow the hair to be shaved. This variation was frequently held in the late 1990s during Lucha Libre AAA Worldwide shows. These matches are considered by many to be disrespectful to the audience since they allow masked wrestlers to avoid risking their identities, or are seen as a convenient way for a masked wrestler with a strong streak of wager matches to lose one without risking anything. The most notorious example of this was Super Muñeco, an extremely successful wrestler in mask versus mask matches who won more than 100 wagers, whose only wager loss in his career was an apuestas al revés match against Halloween. In a variant of apuestas al revés matches, neither the masks nor the hair of the wrestlers are on the line; rather, the luchadores bet the masks or the hair of others.
- Título contra Cabello, Máscara o Carrera (title versus hair, mask or career): In this match, if the title challenger loses, they are unmasked, shaved bald or forced to retire. But if the champion loses, the challenger is crowned the new champion. Since for Mexican luchadores, wagers are much more valuable than championships (a wager bet is a high risk for the luchador, and, in storyline, it would not make sense to put a mask on the line to win a championship), there are few known examples in Mexican lucha libre, but some examples can be found in American professional wrestling. This occurred in 2009 in WWE when Rey Mysterio, a masked luchador, bet his mask against the Intercontinental Champion Chris Jericho in a title vs. mask match at The Bash, with Mysterio retaining his mask and winning the title. Different results occurred on WWE Raw in 2003, when Kane failed to defeat Triple H in a title vs. mask match for the World Heavyweight Championship and was unmasked per the stipulation, and on a 2021 episode of WWE SmackDown when Daniel Bryan failed to defeat Roman Reigns in a championship vs. career match for the WWE Universal Championship and became banished from the SmackDown brand per the stipulation.
- Máscara o Cabellera contra Efectivo (mask or hair versus cash): If the masked or haired luchador loses this match, his opponent wins the mask or hair. But if he wins, his opponent must pay a monetary amount. The most well known example is the 1981 match where Anibal defeated El Solitario and got paid 500,000 pesos (El Solitario kept his mask).
- Carrera contra Carrera (career versus career): In this very uncommon match, the loser must retire. Since losing a mask match can severely impact the loser's career and may lead to retirement shortly after, luchadores who had been masked for decades lose their masks in their final wrestling years against younger talents who need a boost in their rising careers, thus there is little need to bet a career since losing a wager is enough justification to retire immediately or shortly after losing it (examples of luchadores retiring shortly after losing their mask include Gallo Tapado and Fishman among others). The most notable example of a carrera contra carrera match occurred at the 1993 Triplemanía, where Cien Caras defeated Konnan to force Konnan into retirement. Konnan did not stay retired and returned to wrestling after a few months.
- Máscara o Cabellera contra Retiro (mask or hair versus retirement): If the masked or haired luchador loses this match, his opponent wins the mask or hair. If he wins, his opponent must retire. This is a very uncommon match type, so few examples exist, with a notable example being the 2022 match between Rey Milán and Rey Pantera in which Pantera saved his career and hair and won the mask of Rey Milan.
- Apuesta por el Nombre (bet for the name): This is a rare type of match in which two luchadores with the same or a similar name battle for the right to use the name or identity. This typically occurs when the original luchador leaves a wrestling promotion but the promotion retains the name and character (often at the protest of the original luchador) and gives the gimmick to another luchador. If the original name owner returns to the promotion, they may claim to be the rightful owner of the character and adopt a similar name. If conditions allow, this can be solved in a lucha de apuesta where the winner is considered the rightful owner of the character. Sometimes, but not necessarily, it may also result in the loss of the loser's mask. In 2010, Adolfo Tapia (known as L.A. Park, a wordplay for "La Auténtica Park", i.e., "The Authentic Parka") and Jesús Alfonso Huerta (known as La Parka) competed in an apuesta por el nombre; Tapia won the match but failed to recover the "La Parka" name as the Mexico City Boxing and Wrestling Commission reversed the decision, and Huerta retained the identity until his death in 2020. Another example is Mr. Niebla (Efrén Tiburcio Márquez) from Consejo Mundial de Lucha Libre who won a name and mask bet against Mr. Niebla (Miguel Ángel Guzmán Velázquez) from the International Wrestling Revolution Group.

Sometimes, an additional gimmick is added to a lucha de apuestas. Whether it's because multiple rivals are vying for an Apuestas match at the same time, an upcoming big show lacks a strong enough feud going in to make a high-stakes main event out of, or younger and/or lower-card talent are being showcased who might not garner the necessary attention & support for a mano a mano bout. The following are gimmicks sometimes attached to the standard Luchas de Apuestas formula:

- Infierno en el Ring (inferno/hell in the ring): Seemingly innovated by CMLL at 2000's Entre Torre Infernal event (and held at least once annually every year since), Infierno en el Ring is a multi-man steel cage match in which entrants all bet their hair or mask. Once all competitors have entered (ranging anywhere from 4 to 16), they are confined to the structure for several minutes, after which they are permitted to attempt escape. As in many multi-man apuestas variants, the ultimate "winner" is technically the luchador who comes closest to failure, as - once all but two combatants have officially left the match and "saved" their hair/mask - the remaining wrestlers traditionally have a standard 1-fall match in the confines of the cage to determine who will relinquish their wager to the other. An example is the 74 Aniversario del CMLL, when Blue Panther won the mask of Lizmark Jr after both being the last luchadores on the cage.
- Parejas suicidas (suicidal couples): also known as Relevos Suicidas (suicidal relays), this is a precursory stipulation that allows multiple options for the final lucha de apuestas match. Multiple luchadors are paired up (oftentimes rivals, in a variant of Parejas increibles) and have a tag team match, with the result determining which set of partners would fight one another for their masks/hair afterwards, usually immediately. Originally, the losing team was always the one to advance to the lucha de apuestas match. However, as of 2013, CMLL has normalized the idea of the winning team advancing, thus emphasizing their enmity for one another and "earning" the opportunity at glory. AAA ran the same winners-advance stipulation in 2005, resulting in Óscar Sevilla retiring El Torero. The most notorious example is the one held within the 80 aniversario of the CMLL, in which Volador Jr and La Sombra (later known as Andrade) defeated Atlantis and Ultimo Guerrero and went for a beat match, with La Sombra winning Volador Jr's mask. This match is also an example that sometimes these variants are not well-received, since the outcome was one of the most upsetting nights in anniversary matches. Even when both were high stake feuds, but the Atlantis-Ultimo Guerrero was the most hyped feud in years, thus the Parejas Suicidas match delayed the feud conclusion, which lead to the disapproval of the public, as it can be heard with the audience booing and cheering "fraud" during the Volador vs La Sombra match
- Ruleta de la Muerte (Roulette of Death): also known as "Torneo de la Muerte" (Tournament of Death), this is a tournament format wherein the entrants all wager their hair/masks, and the losers advance, with the final being a lucha de apuestas. As such, the match is effectively randomized (hence the "roulette") and not necessarily between heated rivals, with each luchador's motivation purely being desperation to retain their own honor. The concept seems to have been innovated by the Universal Wrestling Association in the 1970s, with Triplemanía XXX being a high-profile 2020s example of it in action. It is sometimes combined with the Parejas suicidas stipulation, with either losers or winners advancing, and either the final pair of teams or final pair of teammates having a lucha de apuestas.
- Revés torneo cibernetico (reverse cybernetic tournament): an especially rare stipulation, that essentially condenses the Ruleta de a Muerte into one match. The multiple competitors are split into two teams, and "escape" the match when they score a fall, thus eliminating themselves and saving their mask/hair. Should one team be eliminated, the remaining team fight one another. The final person to score a fall on the final loser claims their wager. Homenaje a Dos Leyendas (2026) featured a prime example, in which Max Star unmasked Polvora.
- Stipulations can also be combined, as was the case in the match where El Hijo del Santo took Misterioso Jr.'s mask.

=== Weight classes ===
Since the roots of Mexican lucha libre lie with Latin American combat sports culture rather than modern U.S. professional wrestling circuits, it retains a more detailed system of weight classes than post-World War II wrestling in the United States. Like some British wrestling and Japanese wrestling promotions, lucha libre promotions have detailed weight class systems patterned after boxing. Each weight class has an official upper limit, but examples of wrestlers who are technically too heavy to hold their weight class' title can be found. The following weight/height classes exist in lucha libre, as defined by the "Comisión de Box y Lucha Libre Mexico D.F." (Mexico City Boxing and Wrestling Commission), the main regulatory body in Mexico:

English name	Spanish name	Weight/height top limit	Division titles						
Heavyweight	Peso Completo	Unlimited	National	CMLL	AAA	UWA	NWA	IWRG	WWA
Cruiserweight / Junior Heavyweight	Peso Crucero / Peso Junior-Completo	105 kg (231 lb)	National		AAA	UWA	NWA		WWA
Light Heavyweight	Peso Semicompleto	97 kg (214 lb)	National	CMLL		UWA	NWA		WWA
Super Middleweight / Junior Light Heavyweight	Peso Super Medio / Peso Semicompleto Junior	92 kg (203 lb)				UWA			WWA
Middleweight	Peso Medio	87 kg (192 lb)	National	CMLL		UWA	NWA	IWRG	WWA
Super Welterweight	Peso Super Wélter	82 kg (181 lb)						IWRG	
Welterweight	Peso Wélter	77 kg (170 lb)	National	CMLL		UWA	NWA	IWRG	WWA
Super Lightweight	Peso Super Ligero	73 kg (161 lb)		CMLL					
Lightweight	Peso Ligero	70 kg (150 lb)	National	CMLL		UWA		IWRG	WWA
Featherweight	Peso Pluma	63 kg (139 lb)	National			UWA			
Bantamweight	Peso Gallo	57 kg (126 lb)							
Flyweight	Peso Mosca	52 kg (115 lb)							
Mini-Star	Mini-Estrella	1.524 m (5 ft 0 in)	National	CMLL	AAA				WWA
Micro-Star	Micro-Estrella	under 1.524 m (5 ft 0 in)		CMLL			NWA		

=== Other notable characteristics ===
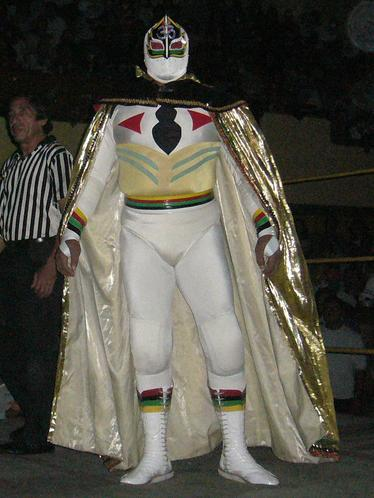
The original Máscara Sagrada has been involved in a long running copyright dispute over the use of the Máscara Sagrada name, outfit and mask with AAA, who claimed that they owned the copyright to the character and has even promoted other wrestlers as "Máscara Sagrada". The original Máscara Sagrada's real name is not a matter of public record, as is often the case with masked wrestlers in Mexico where their private lives are kept a secret from the wrestling fans.

Luchadores are traditionally divided into two categories, rudos (lit. "tough guys", who are "bad guys", or "heels"), who bend or break the rules, and técnicos (the "good guys", or "faces", literally "technicians"), who play by the rules. Técnicos tend to have very formal wrestling styles, close to Greco-Roman wrestling and traditional martial arts while incorporating aerial techniques, whereas rudos tend to be brawlers. Técnicos playing the "good guy" role, and rudos playing the "bad guy" role is very characteristic of Mexican lucha libre, which differs from U.S. professional wrestling, where many technical wrestlers play the role of heels (e.g., Kurt Angle), and many brawlers play as "faces" (e.g., Stone Cold Steve Austin and The Rock). Although rudos often resort to using underhanded tactics, they are still expected to live up to a luchador code of honor. For instance, a luchador who has lost a wager match would prefer to endure the humiliation of being unmasked or having his head shaved rather than live with the shame that would come from not honoring his bet. Rudos have also been known to make the transition into técnicos after a career-defining moment, as was the case with Blue Demon, who decided to become a técnico after his wrestling partner, Black Shadow, was unmasked by the legendary Santo. Tag teams are sometimes composed of both rudos and técnicos in what are called parejas increibles ("incredible pairings"). Parejas increibles highlight the conflict between a luchador's desire to win and his contempt for his partner.

A staple gimmick present in lucha libre since the 1950s is the exótico, a character in drag. While the exótico was initially more subdued, it is argued that the gimmick has recently attained a more flamboyant outlook.

Luchadores, like their foreign counterparts, seek to obtain a campeonato ("championship") through winning key wrestling matches. Since many feuds and shows are built around luchas de apuestas, title matches play a less prominent role in Mexico than in America. Titles can be defended as little as one time per year.

Currently the two biggest lucha libre promotions in Mexico are Consejo Mundial de Lucha Libre (CMLL), which was founded in 1933 by the "father of Mexican professional wrestling" Salvador Lutteroth, and Lucha Libre AAA Worldwide (AAA), founded in the early 1990s by Antonio Peña.

== Rules of lucha libre ==
The rules of lucha libre are similar to those of American professional wrestling singles matches. Matches can be won by pinning the opponent to the mat for the count of three, making him submit, knocking him out of the ring for a predetermined count (generally twenty), or by disqualification. Using the ropes for leverage is illegal, and once a luchador is on the ropes, his opponent must release any holds and he will not be able to pin him.

Disqualifications occur when an opponent uses an illegal hold or move, such as the piledriver (referred as a "Martinete"), which is an illegal move in lucha libre and grounds for immediate disqualification, although some variants are legal in certain promotions; or when he hits his opponent in the groin (referred to as a "foul"); when he uses outside interference; when he attacks the referee; or when he completely rips off his opponent's mask. In many lucha libre promotions, matches are two out of three falls, which had been the norm for title matches in the United States and Japan but was widely abandoned by the 1970s.

A unique rule in lucha libre applies during tag team matches: when a team's legal wrestler touches the ground outside the ring, a teammate may enter the ring to take his place as a legal competitor. Since the legal wrestler can step on the floor willingly, it is not necessary to tag a teammate to enter the match. This often allows for much more frantic action to take place in the ring than would be possible under standard tag rules.

== Participants in lucha libre ==
=== Female professional wrestlers ===
In addition to male wrestlers, female wrestlers or luchadoras also compete in Mexican lucha libre. The CMLL World Women's Championship is the top title for CMLL's women's division, while the AAA equivalent is the Reina de Reinas Championship. AAA also recognizes a World Mixed Tag Team Championship, contested by tag teams composed of a luchador and luchadora respectively. In 2000, the all-female promotion Lucha Libre Femenil (LLF) was founded.

=== Exóticos ===
Exóticos are male wrestlers who perform while incorporating feminine aspects into their wrestling personas, known as "gimmicks". Often compared to drag queens, they are characterized by a campy style, feminine costumes, and humor. Though not all exóticos are gay, some are and most incorporate sexual ambiguity into their performances. Wearing feather boas, headdresses, sequins or stockings, they are often seen as defying traditional macho Latino culture.

=== Mini-Estrellas ===
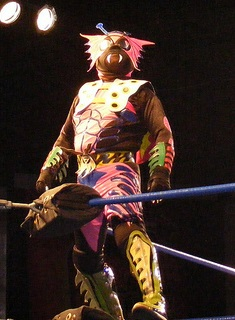
Cuije, an example of a Mini-Estrella

Lucha libre promotions maintain divisions for wrestlers known as Mini-Estrellas, also known as Pequeño Estrellas and simply Minis. Unlike American midget wrestling, Mini-Estrellas divisions are not just for dwarfs but also for luchadores that are short. The maximum allowable height to participate in the minis division was originally 5 feet, but in recent years wrestlers such as Pequeño Olímpico have worked in CMLL's minis division despite being 1.69 m (5 ft 6 1/2 in) tall. Mini-Estrella wrestling was first popularized in the 1970s with wrestlers like Pequeño Goliath and Arturito (a wrestler with an R2-D2 gimmick) becoming noticed for their comedic abilities. In the late 1980s and early 1990s, CMLL created the first actual minis division, the brainchild of then-CMLL booker Antonio Peña, which placed an emphasis on athleticism and spectacular high-flying techniques over comedy. CMLL created the CMLL World Pequeño Estrellas Championship in 1992, making it the oldest minis championship still in existence today. Minis are often patterned after "regular-sized" wrestlers and are sometimes called mascotas ("mascots") if they team with the regular-sized version. In 2002, AAA introduced the AAA Mascot Tag Team Championship, a tag team title for teams of a regular-sized wrestler and a mascota.

In the mid-2000s, American professional wrestling promotion WWE brought in a number of Mexican Mini-Estrella wrestlers as part of its "Juniors Division".

In the 2010s, CMLL introduced the Micro-Estrellas division, exclusively for luchadores with dwarfism.

== Lucha libre outside Mexico ==
Mil Máscaras, a professional wrestler from San Luis Potosí, is considered one of the first Mexican stars to become a star outside his native country and is credited with popularizing the lucha libre style in the United States and around the world.

CMLL's events previously aired in the U.S. on the Spanish-language cable networks, Galavisión and LATV. Lucha Underground was a lucha libre-themed action drama television series produced by the United Artists Media Group which aired in English on the El Rey Network and in Spanish on UniMás. It featured wrestlers from the American independent circuit and from Mexico's AAA promotion. The series, which was taped live in Boyle Heights, California, ceased airing after its fourth season.

In 2012, the Arizona Diamondbacks team of Major League Baseball started doing lucha libre-themed promotions. A luchador mask in Diamondback colors was such a popular giveaway at games, that in 2013 the team introduced D'backs Luchador, inspired by the mask, as an official mascot, joining D. Baxter the Bobcat.

=== National variants ===
With many Japanese professional wrestlers completing their training in Mexico (notably Gran Hamada and his students), lucha libre began to influence puroresu, the Japanese form of professional wrestling, culminating in the creation of lucharesu in Japan, a mixture of Mexican lucha libre and Japanese puroresu. While Mexican lucha libre combines Greco-Roman wrestling techniques with high-flying aerial maneuvers, Japanese lucharesu emphasizes a much faster high-flying style. Famous lucharesu wrestlers include Último Dragón, The Great Sasuke, Super Delfin, and Dick Togo among others. Lucha libre in Puerto Rico has developed a distinct style and presentation and has been considered one of the most popular forms of sports entertainment on the island for more than fifty years. In Argentina, there was an immensely popular lucha libre promotion known as Titanes en el ring. Titanes en el ring was known for its unique, outlandish and over-the-top approach to wrestling, which was developed by its promoter and top star Martín Karadagian. Titanes en el ring's approach to wrestling later influenced the way Antonio Peña presented Mexican lucha libre in AAA.

In Spain, professional wrestling is typically called "catch" (from catch-as-catch-can wrestling) or "pressing catch" rather than lucha libre. In Peru, the term cachascán (from "catch as can") is used and the wrestlers are called cachascanistas. In Brazil, professional wrestling is referred to as luta livre profissional and telecatch; a major wrestling star in Brazil was Ted Boy Marino. In Bolivia, Fighting Cholitas —luchadoras dressed up as indigenous Aymara—are popular and have inspired comic books.

== Promotions using lucha libre rules ==
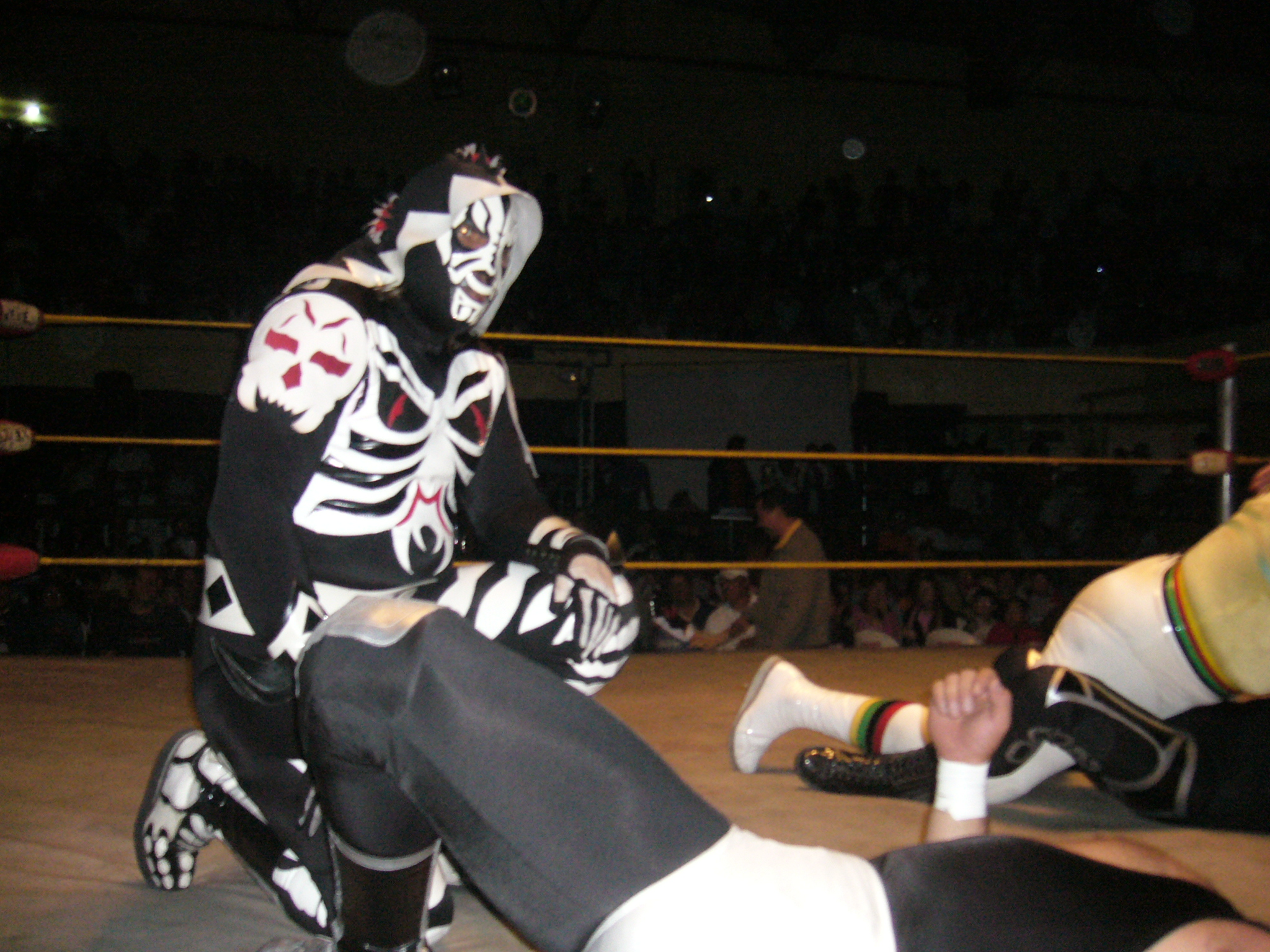
La Parka in action. He was forced to change his ring name from "La Parka" to "L.A. Park" in early 2003 when AAA owner Antonio Peña asserted his copyright claims to the "La Parka" character, barring him from using the name as he promoted a new La Parka.

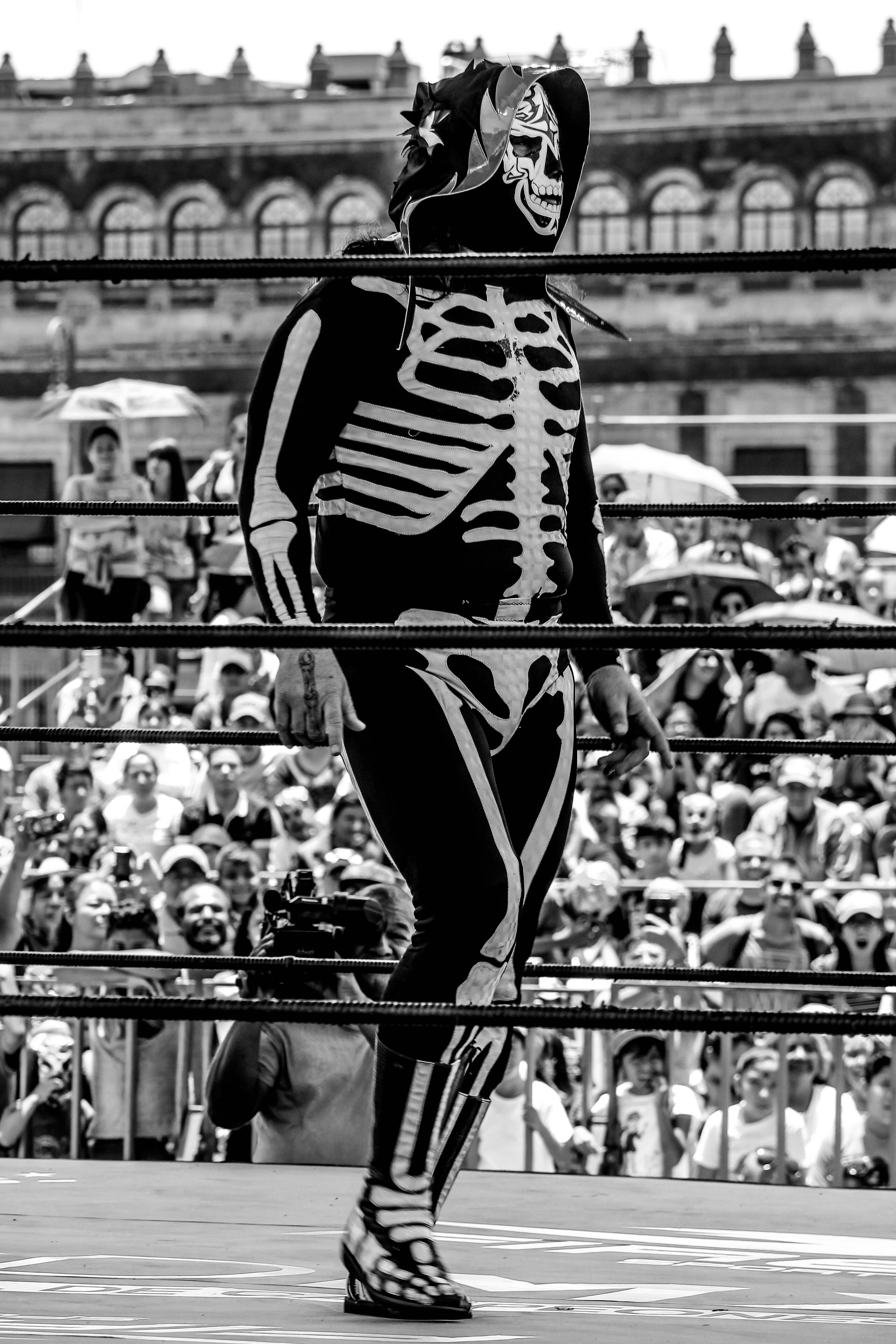
The new La Parka during an outdoor event in 2018

Past and present professional wrestling promotions that have used lucha libre rules:

=== Australia ===
- Lucha Fantastica

=== Canada ===
- Demand Lucha (DMLL)

=== Colombia ===
- Society Action Wrestling (SAW)

=== Mexico ===
- Consejo Mundial de Lucha Libre (CMLL)
- International Wrestling Revolution Group (IWRG)
- Lucha Libre AAA Worldwide (AAA)
- Lucha Libre Elite
- The Crash Lucha Libre
- Universal Wrestling Association (UWA)
- World Wrestling Association (WWA)
- Others

=== Japan ===
- Dragongate
- Michinoku Pro Wrestling (M-Pro)
- Okinawa Pro Wrestling
- Osaka Pro Wrestling (OPW)
- Pro-Wrestling Secret Base
- Real Lucha Libre (RLL)
- Tokyo Tama Luchas (TTT)
- Toryumon Japan / Toryumon 2000 Project / Toryumon X
- Universal Lucha Libre (UWF)

=== United Kingdom ===
- Lucha Britannia
- Lucha Libre World

=== United States ===
- Chikara
- Incredibly Strange Wrestling (ISW)
- Invasion Mundial de Lucha Libre (IMLL)
- Lucha Libre USA (LLUSA)
- Lucha VaVoom

== In popular culture ==
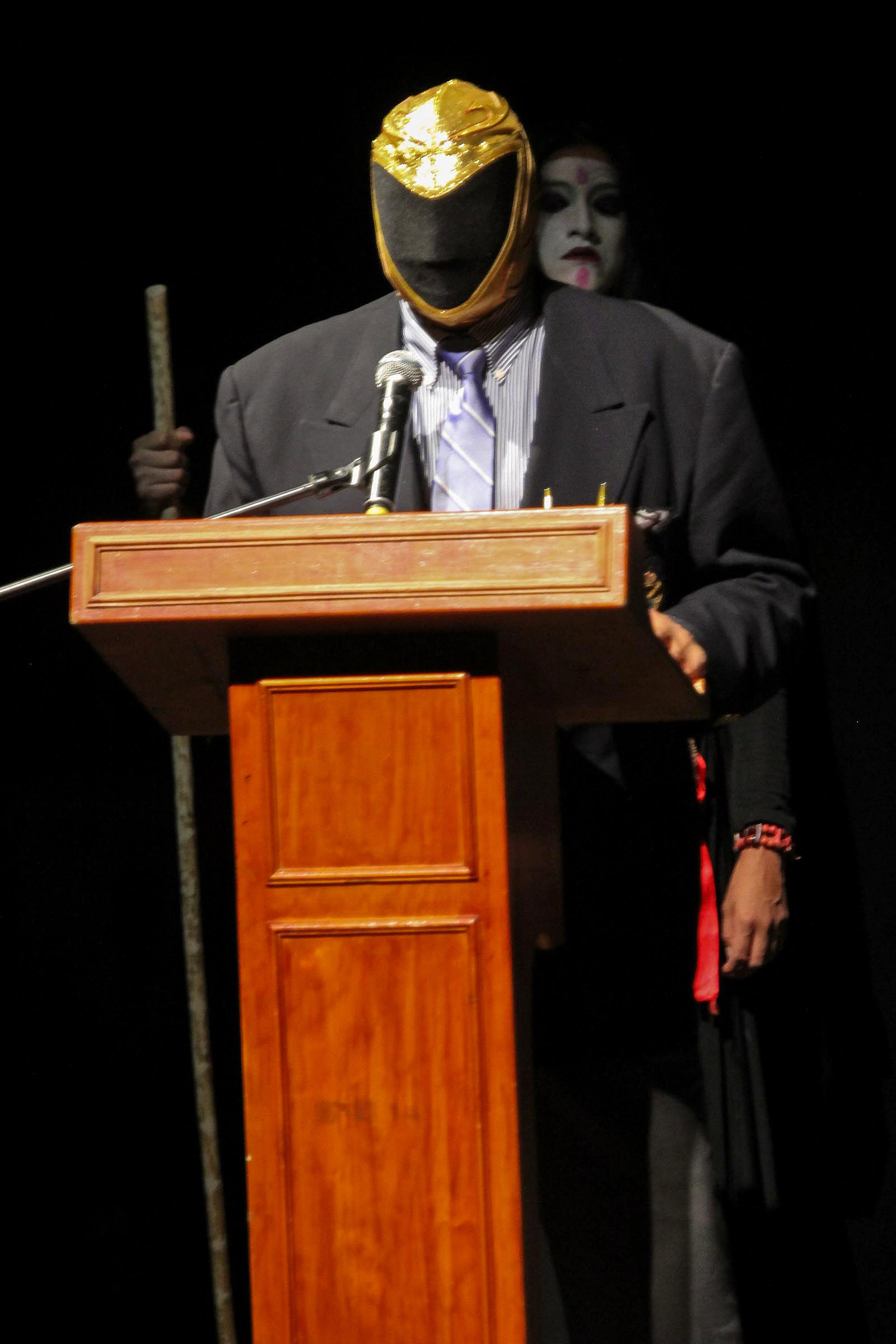
Tinieblas became a legendary figure in lucha libre through both in-ring appearances and his appearances in comic books and films. Tinieblas still wrestles occasionally and has appeared alongside his son Tinieblas II.

Lucha libre has crossed over into popular culture, especially in Mexico, where it is considered the most popular sport after football and boxing. Outside of Mexico, lucha libre has also crossed over into popular culture, especially in movies and television. Depictions of luchadores are often used as symbols of Mexico and Mexican culture in non-Spanish-speaking cultures.

=== Movies and television ===
Wrestlers El Santo, Blue Demon, and Mil Máscaras—collectively dubbed the Tres Grandes ("Big Three") of the Mexican lucha libre tradition—became folk heroes and symbols of justice for the common man through their appearances in luchador films.

The motion picture Nacho Libre, starring Jack Black as a priest-turned-luchador was inspired by the story of Father Sergio Gutiérrez Benítez, a real-life Catholic priest who wrestled as Fray Tormenta to make money for his church. The 2016 documentary feature Lucha Mexico captured the lives of some of Mexico's well-known modern wrestlers. Directed by Alex Hammond and Ian Markiewicz, the feature documented the lives and careers of Shocker, Blue Demon Jr., Perro Aguayo Jr., and Último Guerrero. Rob Zombie's animated film The Haunted World of El Superbeasto stars a Mexican luchador named El Superbeasto. The main antagonist of the animated film Despicable Me 2, El Macho, sports a costume resembling that of a luchador, consistent with his theme of Mexican culture.

Television shows have also been inspired by lucha libre, including the animated series Mucha Lucha. Cartoon Network Latin America also produced an animated miniseries based on El Santo. "The Cautionary Tale of Numero Cinco", an episode of The WB television series Angel, told the story of a family of luchadores called "Los Hermanos Números" who also fought evil. Angel must help the remaining brother, Numero Cinco, defeat an Aztec warrior-demon that killed his four brothers. In the British TV show Justin Lee Collins: The Wrestler, Justin Lee Collins competes as the rudo "El Glorioso", against Cassandro, an exótico, in The Roundhouse, ultimately losing and being unmasked. The book and television series The Strain by Guillermo del Toro and Chuck Hogan features a retired luchador character called Angel de la Plata, played by Joaquin Cosio. In the storyline, Angel de la Plata (based on El Santo) was a major masked wrestling star in Mexico, appearing both in the ring and in a series of movies in which his character battled all manner of foes including vampires. A knee injury ended his career but he is called upon to use his fighting skills against a real-life vampire invasion of New York. The Fox Kids live-action series Los Luchadores (2001) starred a trio of masked wrestlers consisting of Lobo Fuerte, Maria Valentine, and Turbine who not only participate in wrestling tournaments but also fight to protect their home of Union City from numerous threats (both natural and supernatural).

=== Video games ===
Lucha libre is a recurring motif in nearly every game directed by Suda51, starting from his directorial debut Super Fire Pro Wrestling 3 Final Bout. Most prominently, the character Mask de Smith from killer7 is a playable lucha libre wrestler, featuring a mask and cape. The popular video game franchise Pokémon introduced the fighting/flying-type Pokémon Hawlucha, which is a hawk-like humanoid creature with elements of a lucha libre wrestler. The masked luchador and chef El Fuerte was introduced to the Street Fighter franchise in Street Fighter IV. The fighting game Garou: Mark of the Wolves and its follow-ups in the King of Fighters series, featured the character Tizoc who was a luchador that wore a mask resembling the head of a griffon. During the events of The King of Fighters XIV, a character seemingly related to Tizoc became The King of Dinosaurs, a heel who wears a dinosaur inspired mask. The Dead or Alive franchise features a masked luchadora called La Mariposa.

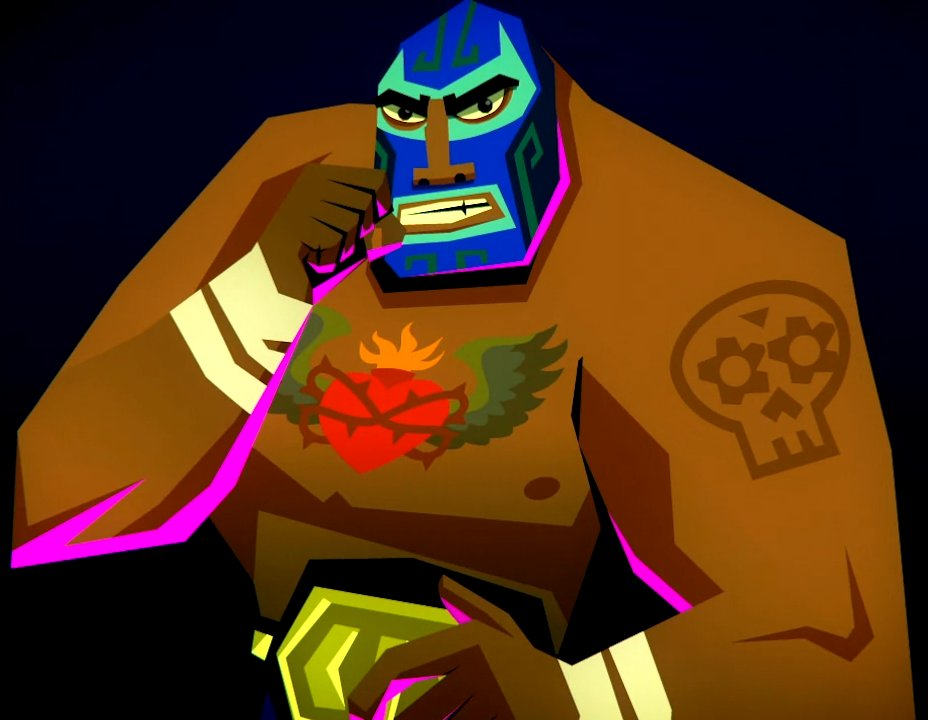
Juan, the protagonist of Guacamelee!, in a luchador mask

The Tekken fighting game franchise features the characters known as King and Armor King, both of whom are luchadores and have similar jaguar-style masks. Guacamelee! and its sequel Guacamelee! 2 heavily feature luchador masks, with the main protagonist, Juan Aguacate, being bestowed a mystical mask to help him get revenge on Carlos Calaca, an evil charro skeleton (in Guacamelee!) and to help him fight Salvador, an evil luchador (in Guacamelee! 2). The 2005 platformer game Psychonauts features four luchadores (Tiger, Dragon, Eagle, and Cobra) who act as miniboss-type enemies in the level "Black Velvetopia." The player must defeat the luchadores in order to access the arena that will let them fight the level's main boss, El Odio.

Brawl Stars has a rare luchador brawler called El Primo. He punches enemies four times and can perform an elbow drop on them with his super move. Tezca, a playable legend in Brawlhalla, is a masked luchador with a jaguar-themed design and fighting style. Kirby Fighters 2 introduced a luchador copy ability.

=== Internet culture ===
Strong Bad of the Homestar Runner universe began as a parody of Mexican lucha libre and boxing. His head is designed after a wrestling mask and his hands after boxing gloves.

=== Lucha libre inspired products ===
Nike has designed a line of lucha libre-inspired athletic shoes. Coca-Cola developed the Blue Demon Full Throttle energy drink named after the luchador Blue Demon Jr., who served as the spokesperson for the drink in Mexico. Coca-Cola also introduced Gladiator, a Mexican energy drink that sponsored CMLL events and featured CMLL wrestlers such as Místico and Último Guerrero in its advertisements.

=== In mixed martial arts ===
Some Mexican lucha libre wrestlers have had careers in various mixed martial arts (MMA) promotions, wearing their signature masks and attire. One of the most famous examples is Dos Caras Jr., who fought in the Pride Fighting Championships.

Japanese lucharesu wrestler Satoru "Tiger Mask" Sayama founded Shooto—one of the first MMA promotions in the world—and has participated in 3 MMA exhibition fights.

== See also ==
- Lucha libre film
- Professional wrestling in Mexico
- Styles of wrestling

== Notes ==
- Allatson, Paul (2007). Key Terms in Latino/a Cultural and Literary Studies. Malden, Mass.: Blackwell Publishing. ISBN 9781405102506, ISBN 9781405102513. OCLC 71044272.
