= List of professional wrestling promotions in South America =

This is a list of professional wrestling promotions in South America, sorted by country, and lists both active and defunct professional wrestling promotions.

== South America ==
=== Argentina ===
Name	Location	Owner(s)	Years active	Website	Notes	Ref.
Active
Titanes en el Ring	Buenos Aires	Paulina Karadagian	1963–	Yes		
Catch Argentino	Buenos Aires	Pablo Javier Falcon	2013–	Yes		
Federacion Argentina de Catch	Buenos Aires	Rocky Rolando	1990–	Yes		
Federacion Argentina de Lucha	Caseros, Buenos Aires	Javier Guerrero	2012–	Yes	Also Called "Superestrellas de la Lucha"	
Lucha Extrema	La Plata, Buenos Aires	Jeff Aaliya	2012–	Yes		
Lucha Fuerte	Buenos Aires		2017–	Yes	Previously Run on 1975 and 1988/1989	
Defunct
100% Lucha	Buenos Aires		2006–2010	Yes		

=== Bolivia ===
Name	Location	Owner(s)	Years active	Website	Notes	Ref.
Active
Fighting Cholitas				No		
Luchadores Independientes de Enorme Riesgo (Lider)	El Alto			Yes		
Lucha Libre con Altura Bolivia (LLA)	La Paz	Halcon Dorado		Yes		

=== Brazil ===
Name	Location	Owner(s)	Years active	Website	Notes	Ref.
Active
Action Pro Wrestling	São Paulo	Rony "Kidd" Goulart	2019–	Yes		
Brazilian Wrestling Federation (BWF)	São Paulo	Bob Junior	2002–	Yes		
Evolution Wrestling Force (EWF)	Porto Alegre	KaOz	2013–	Yes		
Federação Internacional de Luta Livre (FILL)	Rio de Janeiro	Tytan	2007–	Yes		
Gigantes Do Ringue (GDR)	São Paulo	Michel Serdan	1986–	Yes		
RJPW (Rio de Janeiro Pro-wrestling)	Rio de Janeiro	Domina, Axel e Nogueira	2023–	Yes		
South Wrestling Unión (SWU)	Porto Alegre	Rusher	2011–	Yes		

=== Chile ===
Name	Location	Owner(s)	Years active	Website	Notes	Ref.
Active
Accion Sin Limites (ASL)	Concepción		2010–	Yes		
Arica Lucha Libre (ALL)	Arica		2007–	Yes		
Campeonato Nacional de Lucha Libre (CNL)	Santiago		2015–	Yes		
Chile Lucha Libre (CLL)	Santiago		2006–	Yes		
Federacion Nacional de Lucha Libre (FNL)	Santiago		2015–	Yes		
Federacion Universitaria de Lucha Libre (FULL)	Antofagasta	Darko Navarro	2002–	Yes		
FULL Calama	Calama	Guillermo Contreras	2015–	Yes		
Fenix Lucha Libre (FNX)	Quilpue		2012–	Yes		
Generacion Lucha Libre (GLL)	Santiago	Gibson Eduardo Basualdo Molina	2008–	Yes		
Guerreros de la Lucha Libre (GDLL)	Independencia		2011–	Yes		
HIT Lucha Libre	Temuco		2019–	Yes		
League of Wrestling Chile (LWC)	Santiago		2016–	Yes		
LEGION	Santiago	Braulio Moreno	2013–	Yes		
Lucha Factory Bio Bio	Concepción	Rana & Anibal Wilson	2017–	Yes		
Magallanes Lucha Libre (MLL)	Punta Arenas	Milivoj Marusic & Roberto Araya	2016–	Yes		
MAX Lucha Libre	Rancagua		2006–	Yes	Formerly known as Asociacion Machalina de Lucha Libre.	
Nueva Alianza Guerrera (NAG)	Quilpue		2009–	Yes		
Never Stop Fighting/NSF Full Lucha Libre	San Clemente		2004–	Yes		
NGEN Lucha Libre	La Cisterna		2017–	Yes		
Puerto Montt Lucha Libre (PMLL)	Puerto Montt		2016–	Yes		
Revolucion Lucha Libre (RLL)	Santiago		2004–	Yes		
Valdivia Lucha Alliance (VLA)	Valdivia		2019–	Yes		
Valparaiso Lucha Libre (VLL)	Valparaíso		2009–	Yes		
Xplosion Nacional de Lucha Libre (XNL)	Santiago		2010–	Yes		
Xtreme Club Lucha Libre	Santiago	Santiago Sangriento	2011–	Yes		
Zona De Combate	Concepción		2009–	Yes		
Defunct
Chile Wrestling Now		Esteban Gutierrez		Yes		
Hardcore Wrestling Revolution				Yes		
Impacto Fuerza y Adrenalina	Calama		2016–2019	No		
Lucha Libre Calama (LLC)	Calama		2013–2020	Yes		

=== Colombia ===
Name	Location	Owner(s)	Years active	Website	Notes	Ref.
Active
Colombian Wrestling Superstars (CWS)	Cali		2001–	Yes		
Warriors Action Total (WAT)	Bogotá			Yes		
Society Action Wrestling-Wrestling Acción Garantizada (SAW-WAG)	Bogotá		2001–	Yes		

=== Ecuador ===
Name	Location	Owner(s)	Years active	Website	Notes	Ref.
Active
Wrestling Alliance Revolution (WAR)	Guayaquil		2007–	Yes		

=== Peru ===
Name	Location	Owner(s)	Years active	Website	Notes	Ref.
Active
GeneraXion Lucha Libre (GLL)	Lima		2011–	Yes		
Imperio Lucha Libre	Lima		2017–	Yes		
Leader Wrestling Association (LWA)	Santiago de Surco	Flavio Moran, Otto Vidal & Giancarlo Moyano	2006–	Yes		

=== Venezuela ===
Name	Location	Owner(s)	Years active	Website	Notes	Ref.
Active
NGV Lucha Libre	Caracas	Gabriel Vásquez "Dragon Noics"	2016–	yes		

== See also ==
- List of women's wrestling promotions
- List of professional wrestling promotions in Europe
