= Ted Boy Marino =

Mario Marino also known as Ted Boy Marino (October 18, 1939 – September 27, 2012) was an Italian Brazilian professional wrestler and actor.

== Biography ==
Ted Boy Marino was born in Fuscaldo Marina in the Italian province of Cosenza, in Calabria. He went to Buenos Aires in 1953, in the basement of a ship with his parents and 5 more siblings. There, he worked as a shoemaker, but took advantage of the free time to train wrestling and practice weightlifting. In 1962 he was already participating in television programs such as Telecatch in Buenos Aires channels 9 and 12 Montevideo.

In 1965, Marino came to Brazil. Shortly thereafter, he was hired as a Telecatch fighter by TV Excelsior, which was a great success. In wrestling rings, alongside fighters like "Tigre Paraguaio", Electra, or Alex, among others, he defeated villains such as Aquiles, Verdugo, Rasputim Barba Vermelha, El Chasques and Múmia.

Around this time he also participated in the program "Os Adoráveis Trapalhões" (The Adorable Clumsies) for the same TV Excelsior. The station's executives ordered the station director Wilton Franco to do a show with Ted Boy and the singer Wanderley Cardoso, an youth idol. However, Wilton needed someone to fill in the text and chose the singer Ivon Cury and the actor Renato Aragão, to make the audience laugh. Hence arose the quartet, whose program reached between 50 and 60 points IBOPE. In 1968 Aragão and Ted Boy Marino starred in the film Dois na Lona (Two in the Ring), where Ted lives a fighter who disputes the national championship and in the faces Lobo (played by also deceased Roberto Guilherme, who worked in the programs of Aragão, generally with the role of Sargento Pincel - Sargeant Paintbrush).

On TV Globo, Ted participated in four shows that aired almost daily.

Beginning in the 1980s, with the decline of the telecatch genre, Marino served as an co-star in the television program Os Trapalhões (The Clumsies), usually in the role of villain, in addition to cameos on comedy programs such as Escolinha do Professor Raimundo (Professor Raymond's Little School). He also performed in theaters and clubs inward Brazilian states.

Retired, Ted Boy Marino lived in the neighborhood of Leme, in Rio de Janeiro, and could often be seen on the beach, with his friends from the beach volleyball.

Marino died in a hospital in Rio de Janeiro, due to a cardiac arrest caused by complications that occurred after a thrombosis surgery. He was 72 years old.

== Filmography ==
- 1983 – Os Três Palhaços e o Menino
- 1982 – Os Paspalhões em Pinocchio 2000
- 1967 – Dois na Lona
