= Wrestling ring =

Space in which a professional wrestling match occurs

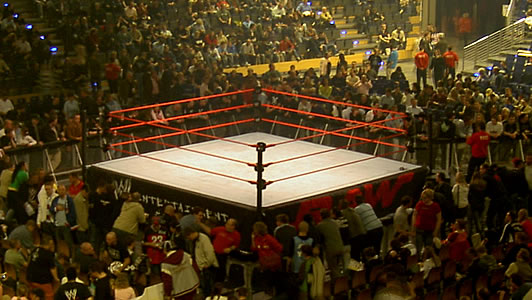
A WWE wrestling ring

A wrestling ring, also known as the squared circle, is the stage on which a professional wrestling match usually occurs. It is similarly constructed to a boxing ring and is traditionally square-shaped, however, it is designed to accommodate the grappling, throws, and high-impact maneuvers characteristic of professional wrestling. In Japan, it is also common to see mixed martial arts fights contested in a wrestling ring, owing to Japanese MMA's roots in puroresu.

== Configuration and construction ==
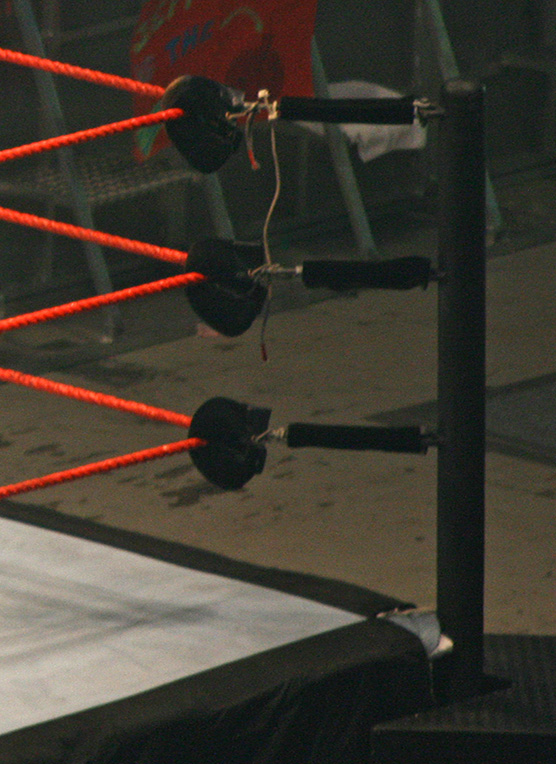
The corner structure of a WWE ring, showing the attachment of the ring ropes to the ring post via the padded turnbuckles

The configuration and construction of the traditional wrestling ring closely resembles that of a boxing ring. Like boxing rings, wrestling rings are also known by the poetic name of the "squared circle", which derives from how combative exhibitions would often be held in a roughly drawn circle on the ground.

Wrestling rings are generally composed of an elevated steel beam and wood plank stage topped by foam padding and a canvas cover. Around the ring are three ring ropes, one fewer than modern boxing rings, which have had four ropes since the 1970s. The materials used for the ropes differ depending on the ring builder or promotion. Some, like WWE, use natural fiber ropes wrapped in tape, while others use steel cables that are encased in rubber hose. Unlike a boxing ring, the ring ropes in a wrestling ring are not tethered together. These ropes are held up and tensioned by turnbuckles, which, in turn, hang on steel ring posts, which also support the frame. The ends of the turnbuckles facing into the ring are padded, either individually, or with a large pad for all three similar to a boxing ring, as in New Japan Pro-Wrestling. A portion of the mat extends outside the ring ropes, known as the ring apron. The elevated sides of the ring are covered with a fabric skirt to prevent spectators from seeing underneath. In the case of WWE's Raw and SmackDown brands and main roster pay-per-view events, the traditional ring posts and two ring aprons had been replaced with LED versions as part of an upgrade in 2015.

Usually around ringside there are steel steps that wrestlers can use to enter and exit the ring. All parts of the ring are often used as part of various offensive and defensive moves.

Wrestling rings vary in shape and size, with most measuring between 14 and 20 feet (4.3 and 6.1 m) on each side. WWE, All Elite Wrestling, and Ring of Honor (Note: Acquired by Tony Khan in 2022) use a 20-foot ring, while in the past World Championship Wrestling, Extreme Championship Wrestling and ROH (Note: From inception in 2002 until 2022.) used, and Total Nonstop Action Wrestling and Major League Wrestling currently use, an 18-foot ring. Typically, wrestling rings are smaller than boxing rings.

The mat of the ring can feature the promotion's logo, but it can also feature advertising all across the ring, such as WWE, following its acquisition by Endeavor in 2023.

== Six-sided ring ==
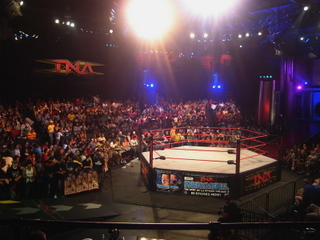
A hexagonal wrestling ring, which was used by American promotion TNA Wrestling in the past. AAA in Mexico occasionally uses similar rings.

While the traditional ring is four-sided, other configurations exist, such as six-sided rings. This hexagonal ring is particularly associated with Total Nonstop Action Wrestling (TNA).

The first known regular use of hexagonal rings in professional wrestling was for the Japanese lucha libre based promotion Toryumon 2000 Project which held its first show in 2001. Hexagonal rings have been used for special occasions such as Lucha Libre AAA World Wide's annual Triplemania event. TNA first used one beginning in June 2004, before reverting to a four-sided ring in January 2010. In June 2014, the six-sided ring returned to the promotion, but was dropped again in January 2018. Per Scott D'Amore, "just about every wrestler in that six-sided ring said it was tougher on their body for injury and wear-and-tear." Other smaller Independent wrestling promotions have used a six-sided ring, such as the Brazilian Wrestling Federation (BWF).

== See also ==
- Dohyō
- Mixed martial arts cage
- Glossary of professional wrestling terms
