= Telecatch =

Brazilian professional wrestling tv program

- Genre: professional wrestling
- Inspired by: American professional wrestling and Mexican lucha libre shows

Original release
- Network: TV Excelsior
- Network: TV Globo
- Network: Record

Telecatch was a Brazilian professional wrestling TV program that combined theatrical performance, combat, and circus elements, inspired by American professional wrestling shows and Mexican lucha libre. The program aired on different networks and bore various titles, most of which used the term "Telecatch". On TV Excelsior, it was broadcast as Telecatch Vulcan between 1965 and 1966. In 1967, it moved to TV Globo as Telecatch Montilla, remaining on air until 1969. In the 1970s, it was broadcast by TV Record under the title Os Reis do Ringue ("The Kings of the Ring"), and Os Gigantes do Ringue ("Giants of the Ring") from the 1980s until the 1990s.

Due to the popularity of the programs at the time, "Telecatch" became a generic term for professional wrestling in Brazil. The name is a portmanteau of "television" and "catch"—the latter derived from catch wrestling, the discipline that gave rise to professional wrestling. The term "Telecatch" also became associated with the Brazilian tradition of professional wrestling, which was strongly influenced by the circus and popular theater. This tradition even developed its own vocabulary: heels were called "bases" and babyfaces "volantes", while pre-arranged matches were known as "marmeladas".

Currently, the tradition of professional wrestling is kept alive in Brazil by companies such as the Brazilian Wrestling Federation (BWF)—founded in 2002—which produces the program BWF Telecatch.

== History ==
Professional wrestling arrived in Brazil during the first half of the 20th century, initially associated with traveling shows, circus performances, and catch-as-catch-can events held in venues dedicated to sports and entertainment exhibitions. As early as the 1930s, Brazilian newspapers advertised "catch matches" and "luta-livre americana matches". Although genuine bouts (including so-called Vale Tudo) also took place at the time, "catch shows" eventually evolved into predetermined contests, where the outcomes were decided beforehand and the action incorporated elements of staging and entertainment; in Brazil, this practice became popularly known as marmelada (equivalent to a worked match in American professional wrestling).

Brazilian television began broadcasting fights almost immediately after its inception in the 1950s. By 1950, TV Tupi in São Paulo was already airing bouts organized by Carlos and Hélio Gracie—the founders and promoters of Gracie Jiu-Jitsu—and in 1951, the practice reached TV Tupi in Rio de Janeiro. During the 1950s, programs such as Heróis do Ringue ("Heroes of the Ring")—broadcast by TV Continental starting in 1959—featured real confrontations between jiu-jitsu practitioners and representatives of other martial arts disciplines, known as "Vale Tudo". Heróis do Ringue ceased broadcasting in 1962 after a match resulted in a broken arm for fighter José Geraldo, who was injured by a submission hold applied by João Alberto Barreto (who would later serve as a referee at the first UFC event in 1993). This televised incident fueled growing opposition to the violence inherent in Vale Tudo broadcasts and led to the subsequent ban of such programs in the state of Guanabara. The cancellation of Heróis do Ringue created a television opening for a format that did not rely on the violence of real combat. In 1965, TV Excelsior premiered Telecatch Vulcan, a program featuring staged wrestling matches that would go on to become one of the genre's biggest hits in Brazil.

An Italian-born Argentinian pro wrestler who went by the ring name of Ted Boy Marino signed on in 1967 and became the program's biggest star as a baby face. His popularity extended beyond the wrestling ring, leading to appearances in other mainstream television attractions and establishing him as a cultural icon in Brazil. His signature flying scissors maneuver (tesoura voadora) became one of his trademarks, captivating Brazilian audiences and becoming a sensation in its own right. The main sponsor was the chain stores Imperatriz das Sedas. Besides Marino, some other figures included Fantomas, a masked character performed by multiple wrestlers, Aquiles "o Matador" ("the Killer", for having reportedly killed an opponent during a wrestling match when a staged sequence went wrong), Mongol, Verdugo, Tigre Paraguaio, Leopardo, Múmia (a mummy character) and Rasputim Barba Vermelha, among many other wrestlers.

The Brazilian tradition of professional wrestling also developed its own unique vocabulary. Wrestlers were traditionally divided into bases (the villains) and volantes (the heroes)—roles roughly corresponding to the "heels" and "faces" of English-language professional wrestling. The terms base and volante originate from acrobatic gymnastics and circus traditions: the base is the member responsible for providing support, while the volante (flyer) is the one who performs aerial maneuvers and is supported or launched. Just as an acrobat is lifted, thrown, and guided by a base, the volante (face) takes center stage and drives the action of the match against the base (heel). Pre-arranged matches were known as marmeladas ("marmelade"), as opposed to matches fought no duro ("hard"), where the contest was genuine. The technical vocabulary also included specific names for moves: drap was used for the dropkick, pilão ("pestle") referred to the piledriver, while tesoura ("scissor") corresponded to the flying headscissors.

Telecatch was criticized by Hélio Gracie, one of the founders of Brazilian jiu-jitsu, who expressed concern about the "fake fights" that characterized the show. Gracie, a pioneer of vale-tudo and inspiration for MMA (Mixed Martial Arts), always defended the practice of real and effective fights, considering that Telecatch distorted the image of legitimate martial arts. He appeared alongside Ted Boy Marino in an episode of the popular comedy show Os Trapalhões. On the other hand, his brother Oswaldo Gracie, reportedly participated in worked professional wrestling, as a masked wrestler to conceal his identity, during a period of financial difficulty in the 1920s.

Initially named Telecatch Vulcan—due to a sponsorship from Cassini family's rubber company "Vulcan" and the Imperatriz das Sedas retail chain (owned by partners César Murane and Rafick)—the show aired on TV Excelsior from 1965 to 1966. From 1967–1969 it moved to TV Globo and due to a change in sponsorship with Rum Montilla, it was later renamed Telecatch Montilla, and finally Os Reis do Ringue after it moved to TV Record in the 1970s. In 1969, the censorship imposed by the Brazilian military dictatorship placed scheduling restrictions on telecatch, mandating that such programs be aired only after 11:00 PM. This restriction impacted its presence in primetime television, particularly because a significant portion of the audience consisted of children and adolescents. Concurrently, economic factors led Imperatriz das Sedas and its associated companies to withdraw funding for original productions. However, this did not mark the end of televised professional wrestling in Brazil; it continued on various other networks and under different names in the decades that followed, though it never again reached the same heights as the original telecatch programs.

Starting in 1973, wrestler and promoter Michel Serdan developed Gigantes do Ringue ("Giants of the Ring"), which aired on Rede Record and later on other stations such as TV Gazeta, becoming one of Brazilian television's premier wrestling attractions. On TV Record, the program achieved great popularity during its first major television run, airing roughly between 1980 and 1990. Compared to the original Telecatch, Gigantes do Ringue featured an approach more focused on theatrical entertainment and humor, incorporating more physical comedy and caricatured characters. This combination helped make it a benchmark for televised professional wrestling in Brazil, especially among children and young audiences during the 1980s and 1990s. At times, it reportedly reached second place in the Ibope audience ratings, competing with Globo’s ever-popular telenovelas and challenging the dominance of the country’s leading television network. By the early 90s, the program was losing popularity, becoming stale and creatively stagnated, and its run on Record came to an end amid changes in the network's ownership and editorial direction following its acquisition by Bishop Edir Macedo, founder of the Universal Church of the Kingdom of God. The show's flamboyant villains and characters with demonic or satanic imagery were at odds with the religious orientation of the network's new owners. During the same period, other professional wrestling programs also aired on Brazilian television, such as Astros do Ringue ("Stars of the Ring") on TV Bandeirantes and Campeões do Ringue ("Champions of the Ring") on TV Record Unlike countries such as the United States, Japan, and Mexico—where major specialized professional wrestling promotions like the WWF, NJPW, and CMLL became established—the Brazilian landscape was characterized by the activities of individual promoters, groups of wrestlers, and television productions, lacking a national promotion with the scale and longevity comparable to those organizations. Gigantes do Ringue continued its television run with a much smaller-scale production, moving across different networks and ultimately airing for the last time in 2006 on TV Bandeirantes.

In the 1990s, the World Wrestling Federation (WWF, now WWE) was broadcast on Rede Manchete via the program Supercatch, the Brazilian version of WWF Superstars, with later including tapings of WWF Raw and WWF Action Zone. It achieved strong ratings on Saturdays (between 10 and 12 points), reaching second place in the Ibope rankings and exposed the Brazilian public to the North American model of professional wrestling.

Telecatch lost ground on Brazilian broadcast television throughout the 1990s. According to wrestler Bob Júnior (founder of the BWF), one of the factors behind the decline in public interest was the stale and predictable repetition of simpler storylines and matches, which gradually diminished their appeal to audiences. During this same period, Vale Tudo began to gain greater visibility, and in the late 1990s and early 2000s, mixed martial arts (MMA) underwent a process of rapid expansion—particularly in Brazil—driven by the growth of the Ultimate Fighting Championship (UFC), which offered an alternative for audiences seeking real fights rather than staged matches.

Currently, although professional wrestling in Brazil has not regained the prominence it enjoyed in the 1960s and 1970s, companies dedicated to the sport still exist. Among them is the Brazilian Wrestling Federation (BWF), founded in 2002 in São Paulo, which produces the program BWF Telecatch—a show in production since 2009. On free-to-air television, the program airs on Rede Bandeirantes since 2024 under the title BWF Telecatch na Band and is also available online. A few other companies such as Action Pro Wrestling (APW), also in São Paulo, FILL (International Luta Livre Federation) in Rio de Janeiro, EWF (Extreme Wrestling Force) in Porto Alegre, started to bring a similar product to the table. The most recent promotion is Dungeon Pro Wrestling (DPW), founded in 2019 but started their activities in 2024 with the objective to bring international learnings to the Telecatch tradition. Of those, only BWF is broadcast to national television.

== See also ==
- List of professional wrestling television series
