= Lucha Underground season 1 =

Lucha Underground
- Season 1
- The Logo for Lucha Underground
- No. of episodes: 39

Release
- Original network: El Rey Network (English); UniMás (Spanish)
- Original release: October 29, 2014 – August 5, 2015

Season chronology
- Next → Season 2

The first season of Lucha Underground, a lucha libre or professional wrestling show, aired from October 29, 2014 through August 5, 2015 on the El Rey Network in the United States and on later dates on UniMás in Mexico. The debut season of Lucha Underground had 39 episodes in total and presented Lucha libre as a mixture of reality and fiction, adding fantastical elements and movie style backstage clips mixed in with wrestling matches.

== Plot overview ==
The first season on Lucha Underground introduced the viewers to Dario Cueto (Luis Fernandez-Gil), the owner of the "Lucha Underground Temple" in Boyle Heights, Los Angeles. Cueto uses his money and influence to stage fights, promoting violence and often rewarding rule breakers while punishing those that play by the rules. During the season Cueto introduced the Lucha Underground Championship, won by Prince Puma in episode 9 (Aztec Warfare). Later on the Lucha Underground Trios Championship was added, with the first champions being the mismatched team of Angélico, Ivelisse and Son of Havoc. During the season Cueto began rewarding several wrestlers with an "Aztec Medallion", later revealing that they all played a part in the creation of the Gift of the Gods Championship, won by Fénix during the season finale called Ultima Lucha.

Other plot lines included the introduction of the mysterious, supernatural character Mil Muertes ("One Thousand Deaths"; Gilbert Cosme) and his companion Catrina (Karlee Perez) as they first fight against Fénix and later targeted Prince Puma. Catrina also brought in a trio called "the Disciples of Death" (Barrio Negro, El Sinestro de la Muerte and Trece). Another notable subplot focused on Pentagon Jr.’s descent into darkness, where he frequently ended the careers of various luchadores and sacrificed their arms to his "Master", who was ultimately revealed to be Vampiro, the ringside commentator. The season also included a side plot featuring Cueto, his brother Matanza, and Black Lotus (Angela Fong), who tries to kill Cueto and a masked wrestler known as Dragon Azteca who trains Black Lotus during the season. In the final episode of season one, Black Lotus kills Dragon Azteca, causing Cueto to flee the temple with both Black Lotus and Matanza in tow.

== Episodes ==
No. overall	No. in season	Title	Taped date	Original air date
1	1	"Welcome to the Temple"	September 6, 2014	October 29, 2014
Owner and promoter Dario Cueto selects the best fighters from around the world to compete; masked heroes and villains battle it out.: No. / Results / Stipulations / Times; 1 / Blue Demon Jr. defeated Chavo Guerrero Jr. / Singles match / 05:15; 2 / Son of Havoc defeated Sexy Star / Singles match / 01:32; 3 / Johnny Mundo defeated Prince Puma / Singles match / 12:31
2	2	"Los Demonios"	September 7, 2014	November 5, 2014
Catina warns Blue Demon Jr of 1000 deaths; Mundo and Puma are feeling vengeful; Sexy Star and Chavo battle Son of Havoc and Ivelisse.: No. / Results / Stipulations; 1 / Johnny Mundo and Prince Puma defeated Cortez Castro and Mr. Cisco (with Big Ryck) / Tag team match; 2 / Chavo Guerrero Jr. and Sexy Star defeated Son of Havoc and Ivelisse / Intergender tag team match; 3 / Mil Muertes (with Catrina) defeated Blue Demon Jr. / Singles match
3	3	"Cross The Border"	September 13, 2014	November 12, 2014
In the main event, Fenix, Drago and Pentagon Jr. fight each other; Mascarita Segrada and El Mariachi face off; after Chavo explains himself, Konnan warns him that Mexico is coming; Mil Muertes fights Ricky Mandell.: No. / Results / Stipulations; 1 / Mascarita Sagrada defeated El Mariachi Loco / Singles match; 2 / Mil Muertes (with Catrina) defeated Ricky Mandel / Singles match; 3 / Fénix defeated Drago and Pentagón Jr. / Triple threat match
4	4	"Thrill Of the Hunt"	September 14, 2014	November 19, 2014
Sexy Star returns to fight Ivelisse; Cueto confronts Drago; Konnan warns Puma against interfering with Mundo's fight against Big Ryck; Sexy Star seeks vengeance on Chavo.: No. / Results / Stipulations; 1 / Sexy Star defeated Ivelisse / Singles match; 2 / Fénix defeated Pentagón Jr. / Singles match; 3 / Drago defeated King Cuerno / Singles match; 4 / Johnny Mundo defeated Big Ryck by disqualification / Singles match
5	5	"Boyle Heights Street Fight"	September 27, 2014	November 26, 2014
Prince Puma fights Big Ryck in the Boyle Heights Street Fight; Konnan worries he's made a mistake; all moves are legal.: No. / Results / Stipulations; 1 / Mil Muertes (with Catrina) defeated Drago / Singles match; 2 / Mascarita Sagrada defeated Son of Havoc (with Ivelisse) / Singles match; 3 / Chavo Guerrero Jr. defeated Sexy Star by disqualification / Singles match; 4 / Big Ryck (with Cortez Castro and Mr. Cisco) defeated Prince Puma / Boyle Heights Street Fight
6	6	"The Key"	September 28, 2014	December 3, 2014
Big Ryck signs Cueto's contract; Son of Havoc calls on Simpinela Escarlata; Johnny Mundo steals Cueto's key as insurance; Sexy Star and Fenix team up against Chavo Guerrero and Pentagon Jr.: No. / Results / Stipulations; 1 / Pimpinela Escarlata defeated Son of Havoc (with Ivelisse) / Singles match; 2 / Mil Muertes (with Catrina) defeated Famous B. / Singles match; 3 / King Cuerno defeated Drago / Singles match; 4 / Fénix and Sexy Star defeated Pentagón Jr. and Chavo Guerrero Jr. / Intergender tag team match
7	7	"Top Of the Ladder"	October 4, 2014	December 10, 2014
Prince Puma, Johnny Mundo and Big Ryck fight each other; the first Luchador to climb the ladder will claim Cueto's prize.: No. / Results / Stipulations; 1 / King Cuerno defeated Super Fly / Singles match; 2 / Chavo Guerrero Jr. (with Pentagón Jr.) defeated Fénix (with Sexy Star) / Singles match; 3 / Johnny Mundo defeated Prince Puma (with Konnan) and Big Ryck (with Cortez Castro, Mr. Cisco and Bael) / Ladder match for the $100,000 briefcase
8	8	"A Unique Opportunity"	October 4, 2014	December 17, 2014
Cueto plans a 10-way match and a Boyle Heights Battle Royal; Cueto promises a valuable prize for two luchadores.: No. / Results / Stipulations; 1 / Fénix defeated Pentagón Jr., King Cuerno, Drago, Big Ryck, Super Fly, Prince Puma, Son of Havoc, El Mariachi Loco and Mascarita Sagrada / Ten-way match; 2 / Mil Muertes (with Catrina) defeated Johnny Mundo, Sexy Star, Pimpinela Escarlata, The Crew (Cortez Castro, Mr. Cisco and Bael), Famous B., Ricky Mandel and Chavo Guerrero Jr. / Battle royal; 3 / Mil Muertes (with Catrina) defeated Fénix / Singles match
9	9	"Aztec Warfare"	October 5, 2014	January 7, 2015
The champion of the first Aztec Warfare fight will have to survive and out-fight 19 other Luchadores.: No. / Results / Stipulations; 1 / Prince Puma won by last eliminating Fénix (Note: Other competitors were Johnny Mundo, Mr. Cisco, King Cuerno, Son of Havoc, Pimpinela Escarlata, Ivelisse, Drago, Bael, Cortez Castro, Ricky Mandel, Big Ryck, Pentagón Jr., Super Fly, Chavo Guerrero Jr., Mascarita Sagrada, Sexy Star, El Mariachi Loco and Mil Muertes.) / Aztec Warfare for the inaugural Lucha Underground Championship
10	10	"Law of the Jungle"	October 18, 2014	January 14, 2015
The winner puts his title on the line; Drago fights King Cuerno; Chavo confronts Blue Demon; Cage, Angelico, Aerostar and Argenis fight.: No. / Results / Stipulations; 1 / Cage defeated Aero Star, Argenis and Angélico / Four-way elimination match; 2 / King Cuerno vs. Drago ended in a double countout / Singles match; 3 / Prince Puma (c) defeated Fénix / Singles match for the Lucha Underground Championship; (c) / – the champion(s) heading into the match
11	11	"Last Luchador Standing"	October 18, 2014	January 21, 2015
Drago and King Cuerno hunt each other down; the winner must incapacitate their opponent until he cannot answer a 10-count.: No. / Results / Stipulations; 1 / The Crew (Cortez Castro and Mr. Cisco) (with Bael) defeated Pimpinela Escarlata and Mascarita Sagrada / Tag team match; 2 / Pentagón Jr. defeated Super Fly / Singles match; 3 / Sexy Star defeated El Mariachi Loco / Singles match; 4 / King Cuerno defeated Drago / Last Man Standing match
12	12	"They Call Him Cage"	October 5, 2014	January 28, 2015
The champion sets his title aside for the second time in the hopes of defeating Cage and taking home the title again.: No. / Results / Stipulations; 1 / Fénix defeated Mil Muertes (with Catrina) / Singles match; 2 / The Crew (Cortez Castro, Mr. Cisco and Bael) defeated Argenis, Super Fly and Aero Star / Trios match; 3 / Prince Puma (c) (with Konnan) defeated Cage by disqualification / Singles match for the Lucha Underground Championship; (c) / – the champion(s) heading into the match
13	13	"Johnny Mundo vs. The Machine"	January 17, 2015	February 4, 2015
One of the top fights stands in the way of Cage becoming the No. 1 contender; a surprise guest walks into the temple.: No. / Results / Stipulations; 1 / Angélico defeated Son of Havoc (with Ivelisse) / Singles match; 2 / Pentagón Jr. defeated Famous B. by submission / Singles match; 3 / Drago defeated Aero Star / Singles match, 1st of a best of 5 series (A: 0, D: 1); 4 / Cage defeated Johnny Mundo / Singles match
14	14	"Open Mic Night"	January 17, 2015	February 11, 2015
Tensions rise when a new luchador is welcomed into Cueto's temple; the newcomer promises that he will reign supreme.: No. / Results / Stipulations; 1 / Fénix defeated Argenis / Singles match; 2 / Johnny Mundo defeated Son of Havoc (with Ivelisse) / Singles match; 3 / Pentagón Jr. defeated Ricky Mandel by submission / Singles match
15	15	"Eye for an Eye"	January 18, 2015	February 18, 2015
Cueto announces a Trios Tag Team match; Big Ryck seeks revenge; Chavo and Mil Muertes finally face off.: No. / Results / Stipulations; 1 / Mil Muertes (with Catrina) defeated Chavo Guerrero Jr. / Singles match; 2 / Ivelisse (with Son of Havoc) defeated Angélico / Singles match; 3 / Texano defeated Super Fly / Singles match; 4 / Pimpinela Escarlata, Sexy Star and Mascarita Sagrada defeated The Crew (Cortez Castro, Mr. Cisco and Bael) / No holds barred trios match
16	16	"Caged Animals"	January 18, 2015	February 25, 2015
Cage campaigns for a championship opportunity while another luchador vows revenge; one-of-a-kind opportunity is offered.: No. / Results / Stipulations; 1 / Aero Star defeated Drago / Singles match, 2nd of a best of 5 series (A: 1, D: 1); 2 / Cage defeated Prince Puma (with Konnan) / Singles match; 3 / Pentagón Jr. defeated Vinny Massaro / Singles match; 4 / Johnny Mundo vs. King Cuerno ended in a double countout / Singles match
17	17	"A War Started in Mexico..."	January 24, 2015	March 4, 2015
When Cueto puts two luchadores in a spectacular main event in Mexico, it reignites an old rivalry.: No. / Results / Stipulations; 1 / Mil Muertes (with Catrina) defeated Fénix / Singles match; 2 / Big Ryck defeated Sexy Star / Singles match; 3 / Texano defeated Alberto El Patrón by disqualification / Singles match
18	18	"No Escape"	January 24, 2015	March 11, 2015
Pentagón Jr takes on Argenis; Angélico wrestles Ivelisse; Johnny Mundo versus King Cuerno in a steel cage match for the main event.: No. / Results / Stipulations; 1 / Pentagón Jr. defeated Argenis by submission / Singles match; 2 / Angélico defeated Ivelisse / Singles match with Son of Havoc as special guest referee; 3 / Johnny Mundo defeated King Cuerno / Steel cage match
19	19	"Grave Consequences"	January 26, 2015	March 18, 2015
Grave Consequences features a coffin match, where your opponent must be placed in a coffin with the lid shut to win.: No. / Results / Stipulations; 1 / Aero Star defeated Drago / Singles match, 3rd of a best of 5 series (A: 2, D: 1); 2 / Big Ryck defeated The Crew (Cortez Castro, Mr. Cisco and Bael) / No disqualification 3-on-1 elimination match; 3 / Fénix (with Catrina) defeated Mil Muertes / Grave Consequences match
20	20	"The Art of War"	January 25, 2015	March 25, 2015
Two world titles are decided in the Lucha Underground Championship match and Boyle Heights Street Fight main event title match.: No. / Results / Stipulations; 1 / Son of Havoc (with Ivelisse) defeated Angélico / Singles match; 2 / Alberto El Patrón (c) defeated Texano by submission / Bullrope match for the AAA Mega Championship; 3 / Prince Puma (c) (with Konnan and Hernandez) defeated Cage / Boyle Heights Street Fight for the Lucha Underground Championship; (c) / – the champion(s) heading into the match
21	21	"Uno! Dos! Tres!"	February 7, 2015	April 1, 2015
The opening match in a tournament to crown the first-ever Lucha Underground Trios Tag Team Champions.: No. / Results / Stipulations; 1 / Johnny Mundo defeated Angélico / Singles match; 2 / Drago defeated Aero Star / Singles match, 4th of a best of 5 series (A: 2, D: 2); 3 / Big Ryck, Killshot and The Mack defeated Sexy Star, Pentagon, Jr. and Super Fly / Trios match, Semifinals in the Lucha Underground Trios Championship tournament
22	22	"Mask vs. Mask"	February 7, 2015	April 8, 2015
Partners are pitted against one another; the first-ever Mask vs. Mask match; Trios Tag Team Tournament continues.: No. / Results / Stipulations; 1 / Son of Havoc, Ivelisse and Angélico defeated Drago, Aero Star and Fenix / Trios match, Semifinals in the Lucha Underground Trios Championship tournament; 2 / Sexy Star defeated Super Fly / Mask vs. Mask match; 3 / Prince Puma (c) (with Hernandez and Johnny Mundo) defeated King Cuerno (with Cage and Texano, Jr.) / Singles match for the Lucha Underground Championship; (c) / – the champion(s) heading into the match
23	23	"Fire In The Cosmos"	February 8, 2015	April 15, 2015
Final match of the Drago vs. Aerostar best of five series; six luchadores compete for the final spot in the Tag Team Title match.: No. / Results / Stipulations; 1 / King Cuerno, Cage and Texano defeated Prince Puma, Hernandez and Johnny Mundo / Trios match, Semifinals in the Lucha Underground Trios Championship tournament; 2 / Cage defeated The Mack and Son of Havoc / Triple Threat match; 3 / Drago defeated Aero Star / Singles match, 5th of a best of 5 series (A: 2, D: 3)
24	24	"Trios Champions"	February 8, 2015	April 22, 2015
The first-ever Lucha Underground Trios Tag Team Champions will be crowned in a triple-threat elimination match.: No. / Results / Stipulations; 1 / Sexy Star defeated Pentagon, Jr. / Singles match; 2 / Son of Havoc, Ivelisse and Angelico defeated Cage, Texano, Jr., and King Cuerno and Big Ryck, Killshot and The Mack / Triple Threat Trios match for the Lucha Underground Trios Championship; 3 / Son of Havoc, Ivelisse and Angelico (c) defeated The Crew (Cortez Castro, Mr. Cisco and Bael) / No Disqualification Trios match for the Lucha Underground Trios Championship; (c) / – the champion(s) heading into the match
25	25	"The Way Of The Drago"	February 21, 2015	April 29, 2015
Prince Puma fights Drago; Cueto warns Drago that he will be banned from the temple if doesn't defeat Puma; three luchadores compete.: No. / Results / Stipulations; 1 / Fenix defeated Killshot / Singles match; 2 / Hernandez defeated King Cuerno and Cage / Triple Threat match to determine the #1 contender for the Lucha Underground Championship; 3 / Prince Puma (c) defeated Drago / Title vs. Career match for the Lucha Underground Championship; (c) / – the champion(s) heading into the match
26	26	"The Best In the Business"	February 21, 2015	May 6, 2015
The Crew seeks revenge on the underdogs that are now the Trios Champions; Puma fights Hernandez; Cage faces off against King Cuerno; Alberto meets Johnny Mundo; the winner advances to fight Hernandez.: No. / Results / Stipulations; 1 / The Crew (Mr. Cisco and Cortez Castro) (with Bael) defeated Son of Havoc and Angelico (with Ivelisse) / Tag Team match; 2 / Delavar Daivari defeated Texano by disqualification / Singles match; 3 / Cage and King Cuerno defeated Prince Puma and Hernandez (with Konnan) / Tag Team match; 4 / Alberto El Patron defeated Johnny Mundo / Singles match
27	27	"Ancient Medallions"	February 22, 2015	May 13, 2015
Seven luchadores battle over a mysterious medallion; Alberto El Patron fights Hernandez for the top title.: No. / Results / Stipulations; 1 / Aero Star defeated Jack Evans / Singles match; 2 / Fenix defeated Killshot, Cage, Sexy Star, Pentagon, Jr., King Cuerno and The Mack / Seven-way match for an Aztec Medallion; 3 / Hernandez defeated Alberto El Patron / Singles match to determine the #1 contender for the Lucha Underground Championship
28	28	"Shoots And Ladders"	February 22, 2015	May 20, 2015
The Trios champions defend their titles in a ladder match; the first person to climb the ladder and fetch the championships will win the title for their team; Vampiro demands an explanation from Johnny Mundo.: No. / Results / Stipulations; 1 / Prince Puma defeated Marty Martinez / Singles match; 2 / Texano defeated Delvar Davari by disqualification / Singles match; 3 / Son of Havoc, Ivelisse and Angelico (c) defeated The Crew (Cortez Castro, Mr. Cisco and Bael) / Ladder match for the Lucha Underground Trios Championship; (c) / – the champion(s) heading into the match
29	29	"Fight To The Death"	March 21, 2015	May 27, 2015
Fenix fights Mil Muertes in a death match; Prince Puma defends his title as champion against the top contender, Hernandez; Vampiro speaks with Sexy Star.: No. / Results / Stipulations; 1 / Johnny Mundo defeated Aero Star / Singles match; 2 / Prince Puma (c) (with Konnan) defeated Hernandez / Singles match for the Lucha Underground Championship; 3 / Mil Muertes defeated Fenix / Death match; (c) / – the champion(s) heading into the match
30	30	"Submit To The Master"	March 21, 2015	June 3, 2015
Argenis and Jack Evans fight in the Aztec Medallion Match; the Trios Champions defend their titles against a team of DelAvar Daivari's choice; Sexy Star and Pentagon Jr. meet in a submission match.: No. / Results / Stipulations; 1 / Jack Evans defeated Argenis / Singles match for an Aztec Medallion; 2 / Son of Havoc, Ivelisse and Angelico (c) defeated Big Ryck, Delvar Davari and Cage / Trios match for the Lucha Underground Trios Championship; 3 / Pentagon, Jr. defeated Sexy Star / Submission match; (c) / – the champion(s) heading into the match
31	31	"The Desolation Of Drago"	March 22, 2015	June 10, 2015
Cueto sets a four-way match to determine the top contender; Hernandez, Cage and King Cuerno compete against a returning luchador; Chavo Guerrero and Blue Demon Jr. return to the temple.: No. / Results / Stipulations; 1 / Chavo Guerrero, Jr. (with Mr. Cisco and Cortez Castro) defeated Blue Demon, Jr. / Anything Goes match; 2 / The Disciples of Death (Barrio Negro, El Sinestro de la Muerte and Trece) defeated Mascarita Sagrada, Bengala and Pimpenla Escarlata / Trios match; 3 / Drago defeated Hernandez, King Cuerno and Cage / Fatal Four-way match to determine the #1 contender for the Lucha Underground Championship at Ultima Lucha, if Drago lost, he remains banished from Lucha Underground and must unmask
32	32	"All Night Long"	March 11, 2015	June 17, 2015
Prince Puma defends his title against Johnny Mundo; Cueto rules that the one with the most pin fall and submission victories will be the champion.: No. / Results / Stipulations; 1 / Prince Puma (c) defeated Johnny Mundo 5-4 / Iron Man match for the Lucha Underground Championship; (c) / – the champion(s) heading into the match
33	33	"Death Vs. The Drago"	March 22, 2015	June 24, 2015
Cueto sets a rematch between Superfly and Sexy Star; Aerostar, The Mack, Marty "The Moth" Martinez, Cage and Pentagon Jr. complete in a five-way Aztec Medallion Match; Drago and Mil Muertes fight for a spot in Ultima Lucha.: No. / Results / Stipulations; 1 / Super Fly defeated Sexy Star / Singles match; 2 / Aero Star defeated Cage, The Mack and Marty Martinez / Fatal Four-way match for an Aztec Medallion; 3 / Mil Muertes (with Catrina) defeated Drago / Singles match to determine the #1 contender for the Lucha Underground Championship at Ultima Lucha
34	34	"Gold And Guerreros"	April 12, 2015	July 1, 2015
Drago and Hernandez meet; Chavo and his crew fight Prince Puma for the first time; the Lucha Underground Championship is on the line.: No. / Results / Stipulations; 1 / Texano defeated Delvar Davari (with Big Ryck) / Singles match; 2 / Drago defeated Hernandez by disqualification / Singles match; 3 / Alberto El Patron defeated Marty Martinez by submission / Singles match; 4 / Prince Puma (c) (with Konnan) defeated Chavo Guerrero, Jr. (with Mr. Cisco and Cortez Castro) / No Disqualification match for the Lucha Underground Championship; (c) / – the champion(s) heading into the match
35	35	"Fuel To The Fire"	April 12, 2015	July 8, 2015
Alberto El Patron and Mundo face each other; the two will team up with three others in a Atomicos Tag Team Match.: No. / Results / Stipulations; 1 / The Mack defeated Cage / Singles match; 2 / Mil Muertes (with Katrina) defeated Son of Havoc (with Ivelisse and Angelico) / Singles match; 3 / Johnny Mundo, Hernandez, Super Fly and Jack Evans defeated Alberto El Patron, Drago, Sexy Star and Aero Star / Eight person tag team match
36	36	"The Beginning Of The End"	April 11, 2015	July 15, 2015
Pentagon Jr. is confronted by Vampiro; King Cuerno fights Killshot; Sexy Star meets Super Fly; Prince Puma prepares to face his Ultimalucha challenger, Mil Muertes.: No. / Results / Stipulations; 1 / Bengala defeated Delavar Daivari (with Big Ryck) / Singles match for an Aztec Medallion; 2 / King Cuerno defeated Killshot by submission / Singles match for an Aztec Medallion; 3 / Sexy Star defeated Super Fly by submission / Singles match for an Aztec Medallion; 4 / Sexy Star defeated Marty Martinez by submission / Singles match for Star's Aztec Medallion
37	37	"PenUltima Lucha"	April 18, 2015	July 22, 2015
Cuerto reveals the meaning of the medallions; Texano vs. Mundo; Cage vs. Mack; the Battle Royal for the final medallion.: No. / Results / Stipulations; 1 / Texano defeated Johnny Mundo by disqualification / Singles match; 2 / The Mack defeated Cage / Singles match; 3 / Fenix defeated Argenis, Delavar Daivari, Famous B, Killshot, Marty Martinez, Mascarita Sagrada, Ricky Mandel, Super Fly, and Vinny Massaro / Battle Royal for an Aztec Medallion
38	38	"Ultima Lucha Part 1"	April 18, 2015	July 29, 2015
The Machine Cage fights The Mack; Team Havoc faces the DOD; Drago fights Hernandez in Believers Backlash.: No. / Results / Stipulations / Times; 1 / Cage defeated The Mack / Falls Count Anywhere match / 7:42; 2 / The Disciples of Death (Barrio Negro, El Sinestro de la Muerte, and Trece) defeated Angélico, Ivelisse and Son of Havoc (c) / Tornado Trios match for the Lucha Underground Trios Championship / 6:20; 3 / Drago defeated Hernandez / Lumberjack Strap match / 8:49; (c) / – the champion(s) heading into the match
39	39	"Ultima Lucha Part 2"	April 19, 2015	August 5, 2015
Johnny Mundo fights Alberto El Patron; Vampiro fights Pentagon Jr.; the 7-Way Gift of the Gods Match; Prince Puma faces Mil Muertos.: No. / Results / Stipulations; 1 / Johnny Mundo defeated Alberto El Patrón / Singles match; 2 / Pentagon Jr. defeated Vampiro / Cero Miedo match; 3 / Fénix defeated Aero Star, Bengala, Big Ryck, Jack Evans, King Cuerno and Sexy Star / Seven-way for the inaugural Gift of the Gods Championship; 4 / Blue Demon Jr. defeated Texano / No Disqualification match; 5 / Mil Muertes defeated Prince Puma (c) / Singles match for the Lucha Underground Championship; (c) / – the champion(s) heading into the match

== Production ==
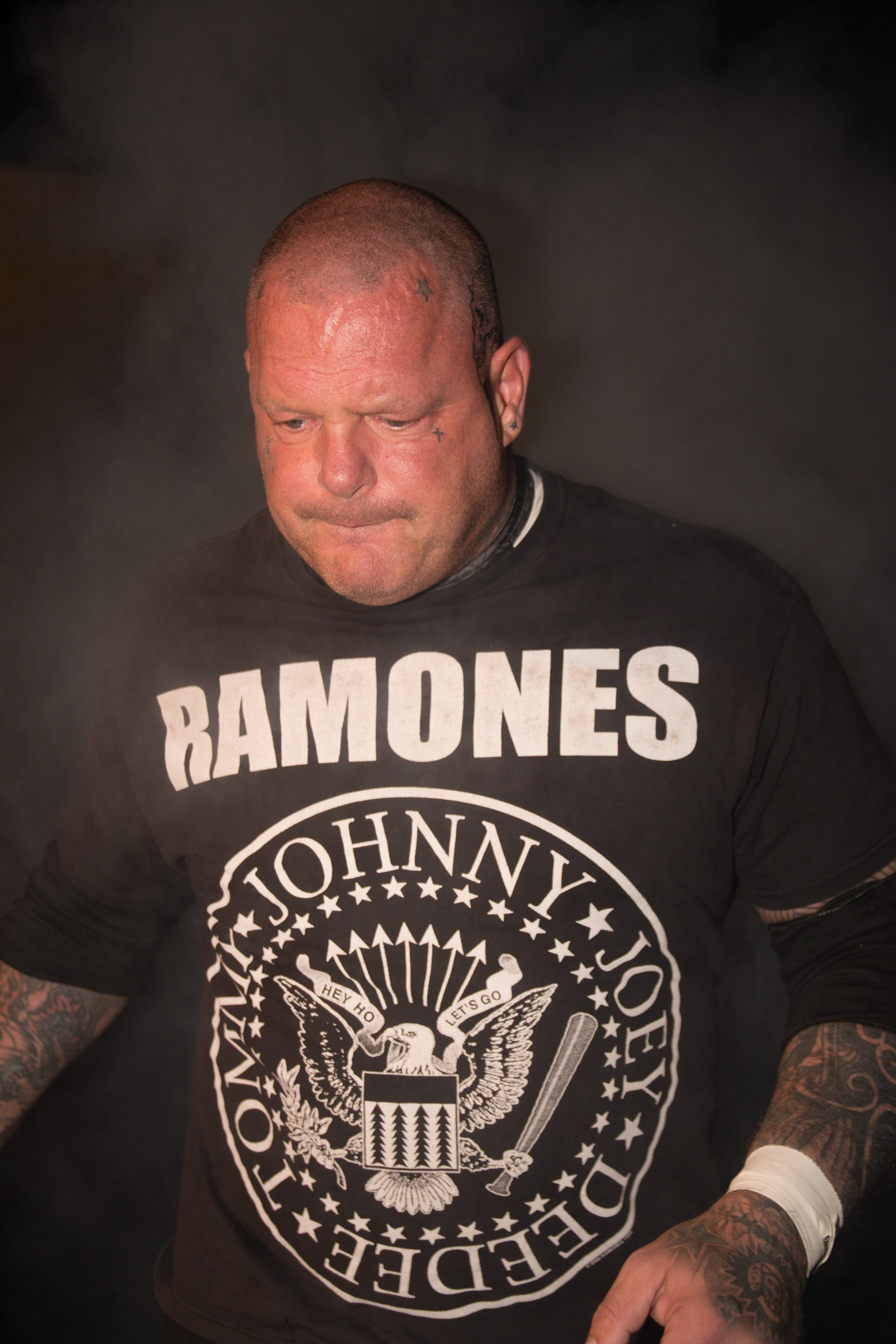
Ian Hodgkinson who provided commentary in both English and Spanish for season 1.

All the wrestling matches were taped on location in Boyle Heights, California where a warehouse was converted into the "Lucha Underground Temple" set. The shows themselves were taped over several weekends, usually with two shows being taped per day. Some of the matches were not shown on television but served more as try-outs for wrestlers, often referred to as "dark matches". Throughout the season Matt Striker and Vampiro (Ian Hodgkinson) provided the English language commentary, while Vampiro and Hugo Savinovich taped the Spanish language commentary used when broadcast in Mexico. For the final show, Ultima Lucha, Vampiro wrestled and his place at the commentator desk was taken by Michael Schiavello.
