= List of former Lucha Underground personnel =

This is a list of former personnel from the professional wrestling promotion Lucha Underground.

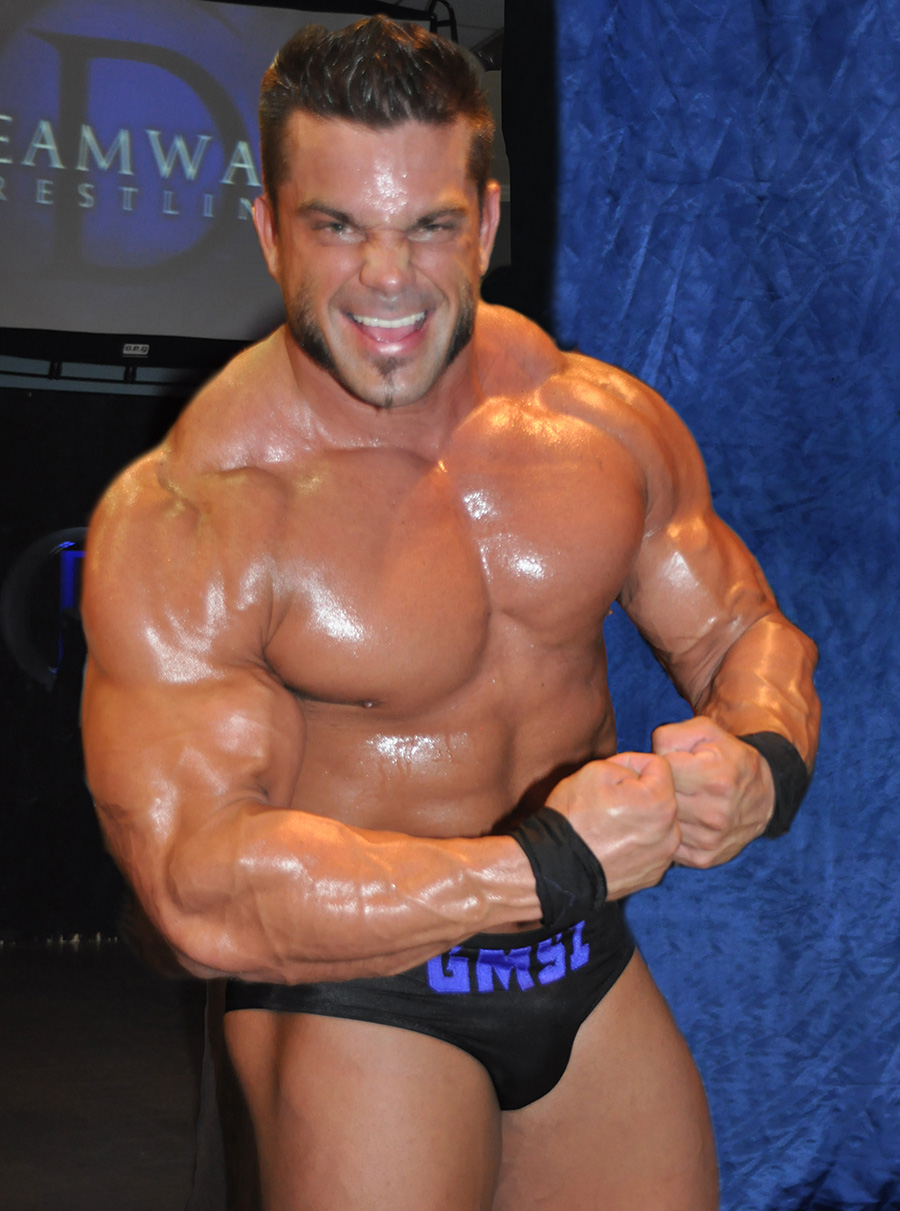
One of the personnel from Lucha Underground was Brian Cage.

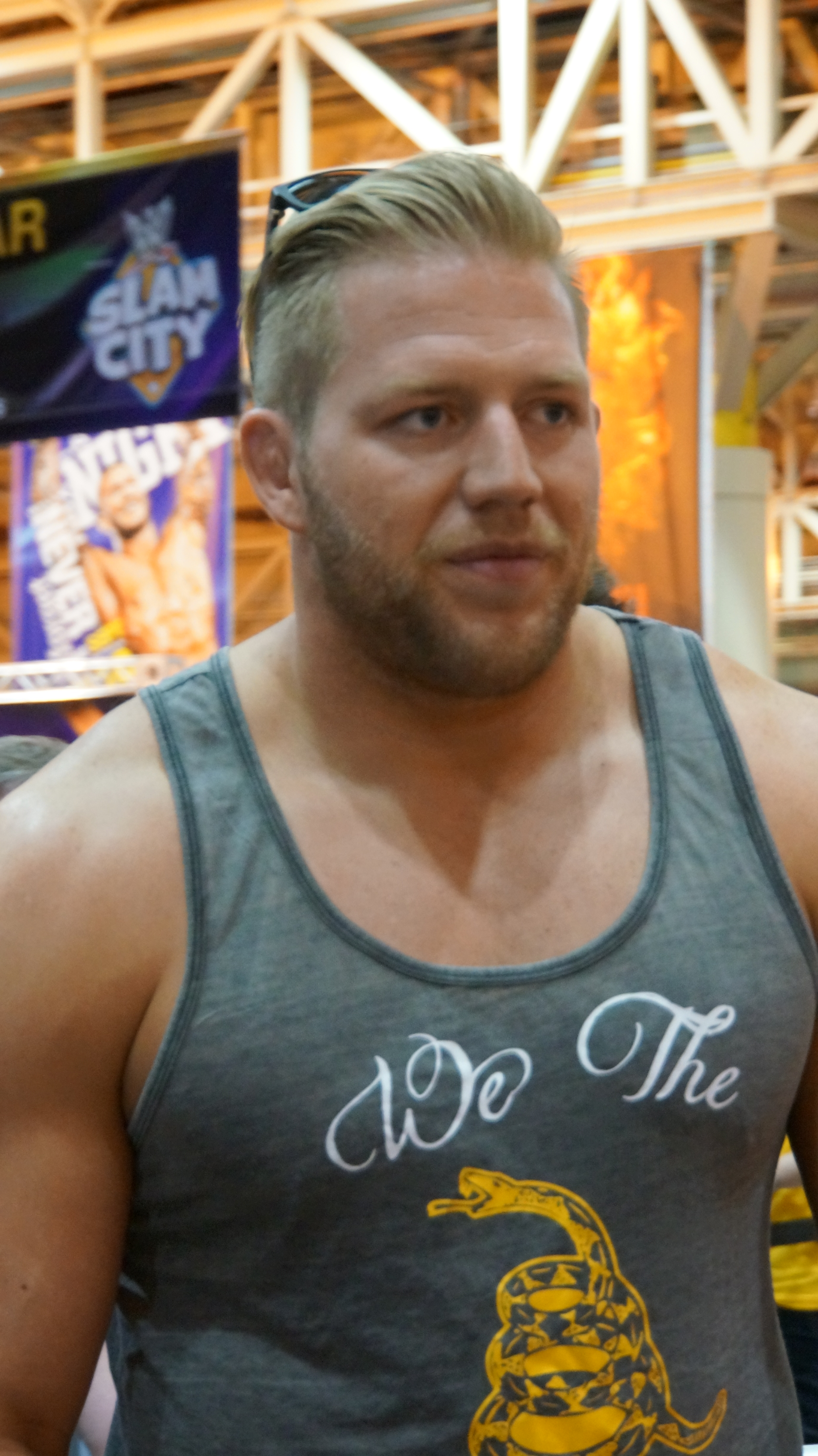
One of the personnel from Lucha Underground was Jake Hager (or Jake Strong).

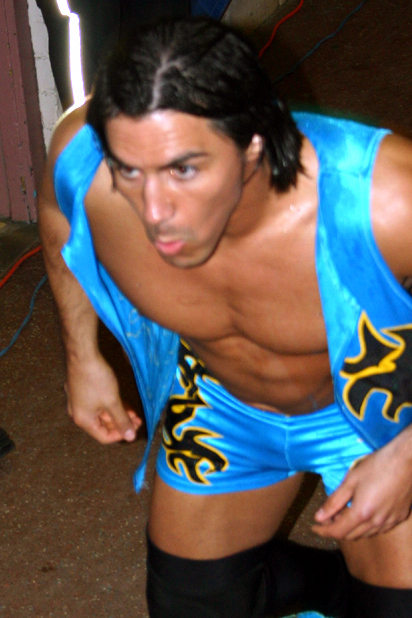
One of the personnel from Lucha Underground was Paul London.

Birth name:	Ring name(s):	Season(s):	References
Ivelisse Milagro Vélez	Ivelisse; Ivelisse Vélez	1-4	
Undisclosed	Aero Star	1-4	
Mirzha Adán Uribe Nava	Argenis; Barrio Negro	1-4	
Junior Gee	Cisco; Mr. Cisco; Mala Suerte	1, 3-4	
Brian Christopher Button	Brian Cage; Cage	1-4	
John Randall Hennigan	Johnny Mundo	1-4	
Jorge Luis Alcantar Bolly	King Cuerno	1-4	
Donald Jacob Hager	Jake Hager; Jake Strong	4	
Gilbert Cosme Ramirez	Mil Muertes; Judas Mesias	1-4	
Unknown	Dragón Azteca; El Dragón Azteca	1	
Undisclosed	El Mariachi Loco; El Siniestro de la Muerte; Saltador	1-4	
Unknown	Night Claw	2	
Sunny Aziza Tate	XO Lishus	4	
Angela Fong	Black Lotus	1-4	
John Steven	Big Bad Steve; Pindar	2-4	
David Arnott	Benjamin Cooke	3-4	
Charles Ashenoff	Konnan	1	
Adam Birch	Joey Wrestling	4	
Adam Bridle	Angélico	1-4	
Juan Aguilar Leos	Texano; Texano Jr.	1-3	
Alvin Burke Jr.	MVP	3	
Jeff Cobb	Jeff Cobb; Matanza Cueto (Note: The Cueto Cup is based on Matanza Cueto.)	1-4	
Stephon Strickland	Killshot	1-4	
Benito Cuntapay	Bael	1	
Dara Daivari	DelAvar Daivari	1	
Undisclosed	El Dragon Azteca Jr.	1-4	
Undisclosed	Fénix	1-4	
Undisclosed	Pentagón Dark; Pentagón Jr.	1-4	
Richard Diaz	Cortez Castro; Veneno	1-4	
Dulce García Rivas	Sexy Star	1-3	
Melissa Cervantes	Kobra Moon	2-4	
Joseph Ryan Meehan	Joey Ryan	2-4	
Phillip Paul Lloyd	PJ Black	2-4	
Deveon Everhart	Dezmond X	4	
Jessie Godderz	Mr. Pec-Tacular	4	
Luis Fernandez-Gil	Antonio Cueto; Dario Cueto	1-4	
Salvador Guerrero IV	Chavo Guerrero Jr.	1-4	
Holly Meowy	The Beautiful Brenda	2-4	
Martin Casaus	Magnificent Marty; Marty "The Moth" Martinez	1-4	
Miguel Ángel Olivo	Daga	3-4	
Brian Winbush	Famous B	2-4	
Godfrey Danchimah Jr.	FBI Agent Winter	1-4	
Óscar Gutiérrez	Rey Mysterio Jr.	2-3	
Kaori Housako	Doku	3	
Kira Renée Foster	Taya; Taya Mundo	2-4	
Mayu Iwatani	Yurei	3	
Undisclosed	Mascarita Dorada; Mascarita Sagrada; El Bunny	3-4	
Lorenzo Lamas	Councilman Lawrence Delgado	2-3	
Trevor Mann	Prince Puma	1-3	
Kevin Martenson	Son of Madness	3	
Jack Miller	Jack Evans	1-4	
Juan González Barrón	Dr. Wagner Jr.	3-4	
Erick Muñoz	Super Fly	1	
Masami Odate	Hitokiri	3	
Melissa Anderson	Cheerleader Melissa; Mariposa	2-4	
Carmen Perez	LAPD Captain Vasquez	2-4	
Karlee Perez	Catrina	1-4	
Melina Perez	Melina	1	
José Rodriguez	Alberto El Patrón; El Patrón; Alberto Del Rio	1	
Justin Borden	Justin Borden	1-4	
Víctor Flores	Drago	1-4	
Shaul Marie Guerrero	Shaul Guerrero	4	
Shawn Hernandez	Hernandez	2-4	
Hugo Savinovich	Hugo Savinovich	1-4	
Broderick Shepherd	Hexagon Dark	4	
Matthew Kaye	Matt Striker	1-4	
Ian Hodgkinson	Vampiro	1-4	
Nadir Mohammedi	Nadir Mohammedi	1-4	
Stéphane Thirioni	Stéphane Thirioni	1-4	
Richard Mathey	Ricky Mandel; Ricky Mundo; Trece	2-4	
Ricardo Fuentes Romero	Bengala	1-2	
Martin Rubalcaba	Marty Elias	1-4	
Michael Schiavello	Michael Schiavello	1	
Nicholas Lira	Nick Lira	1-4	
Paul London	Paul London	2-4	
Mario González Lozano	Pimpinela Escarlata	1	
Rycklon Stephens	Big Ryck	1	
Stuart Alexander Bennett	The Lord	4	
Sam Johnston	Jeremiah Snake; Jeremiah Crane	2-4	
Sammy Guevara	Sammy Guevara	4	
Matthew Capiccioni	Son of Havoc	1-4	
Willie McClinton Jr.	Willie Mack	1-4	
Kevin Kesar	The White Rabbit	4	
Thomas Laughlin	Tommy Dreamer	4	
Vincent Massaro	Vinny Massaro; Vinnie Massaro	1-4	
Austin Matelson	Vibora; Just Judas; Judas Devlin	3-4	
