= Ricky Mandel =

American professional wrestler (born 1987)

Personal information
- Born: Richard Mathey; June 27, 1987 (age 39) Berwyn, Illinois

Professional wrestling career
- Ring name(s): El Americano; Ricky Mandel; Richard Mathey; Ricky Mundo; Trece
- Billed height: 6 ft 0 in (1.83 m)
- Billed weight: 186 lb (84 kg)
- Billed from: Venice Beach, California / Sexy Beach
- Trained by: Shane Ballard; Shannon Ballard
- Debut: 2005

Richard Mathey (born June 27, 1987) is an American professional wrestler who currently competes on the independent circuit and also wrestles for Lucha Underground and Championship Wrestling from Hollywood.

== Professional wrestling career ==
=== Lucha Underground (2014–2019) ===
Mathey debuted on Lucha Underground in a dark match on October 15, 2014 in a losing effort to Hernandez as a jobber. He would however, qualify for the Aztec Warfare match for the Lucha Underground Championship, but was unsuccessful. During the first two seasons of Lucha Underground, Mandel also wrestled under a mask as Trece, one-third of the Disciples of Death Trios team, along with Barrio Negro, and Sinestro de la Muerte, though Mandel was not acknowledged to be the man under the mask. On the April 20, 2016 episode of Lucha Underground, the character of Trece, along with Barrio Negro, was killed off, when Sinestro de la Muerte turned on his partners, and ripped their hearts out. Ricky Mandel has since returned as a Johnny Mundo devotee, changing his ringname to Ricky Mundo.

== Championships and accomplishments ==
- Arizona Wrestling Federation
  - AWF State Championship (1 time)
- Championship Wrestling From Hollywood
  - CWFH Heritage Heavyweight Championship (1 time)
- Lucha Society of America
  - LSA World Heavyweight Championship (1 time)
- Lucha Underground
  - Lucha Underground Trios Championship (1 time) – with Barrio Negro and El Siniestro de la Muerte
- Maverick Pro Wrestling
  - MPW Championship (1 time)
- SoCal Pro Wrestling
  - SCP Heavyweight Championship (2 times)
  - SCP Golden State Championship (3 times)
  - SCP Tag Team Championship (2 times) – with Hector Canales (1) and Tommy Wilson (1)
  - Summer Classic Tournament (2012)
