= MLW Azteca =

- Promotions: Major League Wrestling
- First event: MLW Azteca/The Crash show
- Last event: MLW Azteca Underground

MLW Azteca is a professional wrestling supercard event produced by Major League Wrestling (MLW). Its concept is based on story elements from the defunct Lucha Libre promotion and television drama, Lucha Underground, and has been described as a spiritual successor to the latter.

== History ==
Since October 2020, MLW had been incorporating story elements from Lucha Underground into its programming. Talent formerly associated with Lucha Underground were brought into MLW as part of the "Azteca Underground" stable. The stable would later become the central focus of the MLW Fusion: Alpha mini-series, which premiered on September 22, 2021.

On November 8, 2021, MLW announced that it would be holding its second co-promoted event with The Crash, and the first Azteca-branded event, at the Auditorio Fausto Gutierrez Moreno in Tijuana, Baja California, Mexico on December 3. The event was taped for the MLW Azteca mini-series, which aired from January 6, to February 3, 2022 on MLW's YouTube channel.

The second Azteca event, entitled MLW Azteca Underground, was held on April 1, 2022 at Gilley's Dallas in Dallas, Texas. It served as a television taping for MLW Fusion, with several matches airing as part of its special Rise of the Renegades episode.

On December 12, 2023, MLW announced that it would be holding a third event, MLW Azteca Lucha, on May 11, 2024, at the Cicero Stadium in Cicero, Illinois. The event will stream live on Triller TV, as part of an overall deal with MLW to air live monthly events for TrillerTV+ subscribers. Additional matches were taped for Fury Road, which aired as a television special on Bein Sports USA and on MLW's YouTube channel as part of the promotion's expanded event schedule.

== Dates and venues ==
Aired Live

#	Event	Date	City	Venue	Main event
1	MLW Azteca/The Crash show	December 3, 2021	Tijuana, Baja California, Mexico	Auditorio Fausto Gutierrez Moreno	Pagano and Alexander Hammerstone vs. King Muertes and Taurus in a Apocalypto tag team match
2	MLW Azteca Underground	April 1, 2022	Dallas, Texas	Gilley's Dallas	Jacob Fatu vs. Bestia 666 in a Azteca Apocalypto match
3	MLW Azteca Lucha	May 11, 2024	Cicero, Illinois	Cicero Stadium	Místico (c) vs. Bárbaro Cavernario for the MLW World Middleweight Championship
4	Azteca Lucha (2025)	May 10, 2025	Cicero, Illinois	Cicero Stadium	Mistico vs Templario vs Ikuro Kwon in a Triple Threat match
