= One Shot (2024) =

2024 Major League Wrestling event

Eric Bischoff's One Shot
- Promotional poster of the event
- Promotion: Major League Wrestling
- Date: December 5, 2024
- City: Queens, New York
- Venue: Melrose Ballroom

Event chronology
← Previous; Slaughterhouse	Next → Kings of Colosseum

One Shot chronology
← Previous; 2023	Next → —

One Shot (2024), also known as Eric Bischoff's One Shot, was a professional wrestling live streaming event produced by Major League Wrestling (MLW). It took place on December 5, 2024, at the Melrose Ballroom in Queens, New York. It was the third event in the One Shot chronology. The event streamed live on MLW's YouTube channel, with additional matches being taped for the "Holiday Rush" special, which aired on December 24 on Bein Sports USA and YouTube.

== Production ==
=== Background ===
First held on October 5, 2017, MLW One Shot was the inaugural event of MLW's 2017 relaunch as a professional wrestling promotion. The One Shot name would later be revived as an annual event starting in 2023.

On August 28, 2024, MLW announced that One Shot would take place on December 5, 2024, at the Melrose Ballroom in Queens, New York. On October 31, MLW announced that booker Eric Bischoff, most famous for his booking for World Championship Wrestling, would have total creative control for the event.

=== Storylines ===
The card will consist of matches that result from scripted storylines, where wrestlers portray villains, heroes, or less distinguishable characters in scripted events that built tension and culminate in a wrestling match or series of matches, with results predetermined by MLW's writers. Storylines are played out at MLW, across the league's social media platforms.

At Summer of the Beasts, Donovan Dijak made his MLW debut as part of Saint Laurent's World Titan Federation (WTF), interrupting a four-way match. The following month at Pit Fighters, Tom Lawlor of the WTF lost to Matt Riddle in a Vale Tudo Rules match, with Laurent firing Lawlor and having Dijak take him out. Since then, Dijak called out shoot fighters and mixed martial artists in wrestling as fakes while daring anyone to fight him. On November 11, MLW announced that Eric Bischoff had signed a match between Riddle and Dijak for One Shot.

Trevor Lee, formerly known as Cameron Grimes in WWE, was set to debut for MLW at Slaughterhouse, before the event was canceled due to recent hurricane activity. His official debut would be announced for One Shot on November 11, where he would be challenging Místico for the MLW World Middleweight Championship.

Satoshi Kojima was originally set to defend the MLW World Heavyweight Championship against Último Guerrero at Slaughterhouse, before the event's cancellation. On November 14, MLW announced that the match would officially take place as part of the TV taping portion of One Shot.

In the ongoing storyline between MLW and the invading Contra Unit, Contra's Minoru Suzuki and Ikuro Kwon defeated CozyMax (MLW World Heavyweight Champion Satoshi Kojima and Okumura) to win the MLW World Tag Team Championship at Summer of the Beasts. On November 22, MLW announced that Eric Bischoff signed the rematch between the two teams for One Shot.

== Results ==
Eric Bischoff's One Shot
No.	Results	Stipulations	Times
1	Mads Krule Krügger defeated Babathunder by technical submission	Singles match	4:14
2	Delmi Exo (with Cesar Duran) defeated Ava Everett by pinfall	Singles match	4:39
3	Alex Kane (with Mr. Thomas and Faye Jackson) defeated Bobby Fish by technical knockout	UWFi Rules match (Note: This was a "Fan's Choice" match where fans would vote for one of three stipulations on X. The other choices fan were given were a Kickboxing match and a Taped Fist match.)	8:25
4	Místico (c) defeated Trevor Lee by pinfall	Double Jeopardy match for the MLW World Middleweight Championship; Had Místico lost, he would've been forced to unmask.	15:25
5	Matt Riddle defeated Donovan Dijak (with Saint Laurent) by disqualification	Singles match for Riddle's MLW World Heavyweight Championship opportunity	10:17
6	The Andersons (C. W. Anderson and Brock Anderson) defeated Matthew Justice and Paul Walter Hauser by pinfall	EZE's Roulette: New York City Street Fight	9:21
7	CozyMax (Satoshi Kojima and Okumura) defeated Contra Unit (Minoru Suzuki and Ikuro Kwon) (c) by pinfall	Tag team match for the MLW World Tag Team Championship	8:35
(c) / – the champion(s) heading into the match

Holiday Rush (December 24)
No.	Results	Stipulations	Times
1^{D}	Ariel Dominguez defeated D'Angelo	Singles match	—
2	Janai Kai defeated Tiffani Avatar by technical knockout	Singles match	0:09
3	Minoru Suzuki defeated Akira by pinfall	Singles match	10:03
4	Matt Riddle defeated Brett Ryan Gosselin (with The Andersons (C. W. Anderson and Brock Anderson)) by pinfall	Singles match	4:48
5	Titán defeated Magnus by submission	Singles match	10:33
6	Tom Lawlor defeated Timothy Thatcher by technical submission	Singles match	10:33
7	Satoshi Kojima (c) (with Okumura) defeated Último Guerrero by pinfall	Singles match for the MLW World Heavyweight Championship	9:00
(c) / – the champion(s) heading into the match; D / – this was a dark match
