= Azteca Lucha =

- Promotions: Major League Wrestling; Consejo Mundial de Lucha Libre
- First event: Azteca Lucha (2024)

Azteca Lucha is a professional wrestling supercard event produced by Major League Wrestling (MLW) and Consejo Mundial de Lucha Libre (CMLL) that was first held on May 11, 2024 at Cicero Stadium in Cicero, Illinois.

== Dates and venues ==
#	Event	Date	City	Venue	Main event	Note	Ref
1	Azteca Lucha (2024)	May 11, 2025	Cicero, Illinois	Cicero Stadium	Místico (c) vs. Barbaro Cavernario vs. for the MLW World Middleweight Championship		
2	Azteca Lucha (2025)	May 10, 2025	Cicero, Illinois	Cicero Stadium	Mistico vs. Templario vs. Ikuro Kwon in a three way match		
