= Cicero Stadium (disambiguation) =

Cicero Stadium is a stadium in Asmara, Eritrea.

Cicero Stadium may also refer to:

- Cicero Stadium (Illinois), a stadium in Cicero, Illinois, US

== See also ==
- Estádio Cícero Pompeu de Toledo, São Paulo, Brazil
