= MLW Azteca/The Crash show =

Mexican professional wrestling show

MLW Azteca/The Crash Show
- Promotional poster featuring various The Crash and MLW wrestlers
- Promotions: The Crash Lucha Libre; Major League Wrestling
- Date: December 3, 2021
- City: Tijuana, Baja California, Mexico
- Venue: Auditorio Fausto Gutierrez Moreno
- Attendance: ~5,000
- Tagline: MLW vs Crash

Event chronology
← Previous
- The Crash X Aniversario (Crash)
- War Chamber (MLW)
Next →
- The Crash (Crash)
- Blood & Thunder (MLW)

MLW/The Crash chronology
← Previous; 2019	Next → —

Azteca chronology
← Previous; First	Next → Azteca Underground

The MLW Azteca/The Crash Show, also known as the MLW Azteca • The Crash Super Card, was a professional wrestling supercard event co-produced by the U.S-based Major League Wrestling (MLW) and Mexico-based The Crash Lucha Libre (The Crash), which was held in The Crash's home arena, Auditorio Fausto Gutierrez Moreno in Tijuana, Baja California, Mexico on December 3, 2021. It was the second event to be co-produced by the two promotions, following The Crash/Major League Wrestling show in 2019, and the first MLW Azteca-branded event.

The event was taped for the MLW Azteca mini-series, which aired from January 6 to February 3, 2022, on MLW's YouTube channel.

== Production ==
=== Background ===
Other on-screen personnel
Role:	Name:
Commentators	Joe Dombrowski
Commentators	Rich Bocchini
Ring announcers	Tim Barr

In October 2020, MLW would begin incorporating story elements from the defunct Lucha Libre promotion and former television drama, Lucha Underground. Talent formerly associated with Lucha Underground were brought into MLW as part of the "Azteca Underground" stable.

On November 8, 2021, MLW announced that it would be holding its second co-promoted event with The Crash at the Auditorio Fausto Gutierrez Moreno in Tijuana, Baja California, Mexico on December 3.

=== Storylines ===
The supercard featured professional wrestling matches scripted by MLW and The Crash featuring wrestlers involved in scripted feuds. The wrestlers portrayed either heels (referred to as rudos in Mexico, those that play the part of the "bad guys") or faces (técnicos in Mexico, the "good guy" characters) as they performed.

== Results ==
No.	Results	Stipulations	Times
1	Proximo defeated Toto	Singles match	6:11
2	EJ Nduka defeated Adrian Quest	Singles match	3:11
3	Mecha Wolf defeated Extreme Tiger	Singles match	7:57
4	Aramis, Destiny, and Myzteziz Jr. defeated Dinámico, Skalibur, and Arez	Trios match	8:00
5	Mads Krügger defeated Bestia 666	Escalera Al Infierno match	10:16
6	5150 (Danny Rivera and Slice Boogie) (c) defeated Aero Star and Drago	Tag team match for the MLW World Tag Team Championship	7:26
7	Psycho Clown defeated Richard Holliday (with Alicia Atout)	Singles match	10:56
8	Hijo del Vikingo, Laredo Kid, and Octagón Jr. defeated Villano III Jr., Rey Horus, and Alex Kane (with Mr. Thomas)	Trios match	19:21
9	Pagano and Alexander Hammerstone defeated King Muertes and Taurus	Apocalypto tag team match	16:00
(c) / – the champion(s) heading into the match
