= Azteca Lucha (2024) =

2024 Major League Wrestling event

- Promotional poster of the event
- Promotion: Major League Wrestling
- Date: May 11, 2024
- City: Cicero, Illinois
- Venue: Cicero Stadium

Event chronology
← Previous; War Chamber	Next → Battle Riot VI

Azteca chronology
← Previous; Azteca Underground	Next → Azteca Lucha (2025)

Azteca Lucha (2024) was a professional wrestling pay-per-view event produced by Major League Wrestling (MLW), which took place on May 11, 2024, at the Cicero Stadium in Cicero, Illinois. It was the third event under the MLW Azteca chronology and streamed live on Triller TV. The event featured various wrestlers from partner promotion Consejo Mundial de Lucha Libre (CMLL).

Additional matches were taped for Fury Road, which aired as a TV special on May 18 on BeIN Sports USA and MLW's YouTube channel.

== Production ==
=== Background ===
Other on-screen personnel
Role:	Name:
Commentators	Joe Dombrowski
Commentators	Christian Cole
Commentators	Saint Laurent

The concept MLW's Azteca events are based on story elements from the defunct Lucha Libre promotion and former television drama, Lucha Underground. On December 12, 2023, MLW announced that it would be holding Azteca Lucha on May 11, 2024, at the Cicero Stadium in Cicero, Illinois.

Azteca Lucha was MLW's first event to take place at Cicero Stadium since the Saturday Night SuperFight pay-per-view in November 2019. The event would break MLW's all-time box office record, with the announcement that tickets were sold out on April 29.

=== Storylines ===
The card will consist of matches that result from scripted storylines, where wrestlers portray villains, heroes, or less distinguishable characters in scripted events that built tension and culminate in a wrestling match or series of matches, with results predetermined by MLW's writers.

==== Azteca Lucha ====
The main storyline going into the event is the ongoing feud between Salina de la Renta's Promociones Dorado and Cesar Duran's Azteca Lucha, with the two signing talent to their respective stables and pitting them against each other.

The Promociones Dorado stable had been MLW's main umbrella for Latin-American wrestlers and luchadores since the promotion's relaunch. In January 2021, it was found that Promociones Dorado had been acquired by an entity called "Azteca Underground". The identity of "El Jefe", the owner of Azteca, was eventually revealed on the May 5, 2021 season finale of MLW Fusion as Cesar Duran (formerly known as Dario Cueto in Lucha Underground). Salina would be written off MLW after being "sacrificed" by Duran. At Battle Riot III, Duran made his first in-ring appearance to announce that he made a deal with MLW CEO Court Bauer for Azteca to become the new provider of luchadores, and for Duran to become MLW's new matchmaker.

In March 2023, Duran was kidnapped, supposedly by his own Azteca henchmen, and would not be seen for months. Six months later at Fury Road, Salina de la Renta returned to MLW and revived Promociones Dorado, as she set about regaining her influence. Promociones Dorado would gain the MLW World Middleweight Championship and the MLW World Women's Featherweight Championship via Rocky Romero and Janai Kai, respectively; while Salina brought in new talent, such as Jesús Rodriguez and Bárbaro Cavernario, to her stable. However, the February 2024 announcement that Místico was coming to MLW at SuperFight perplexed Salina as she had not signed him. It would later be revealed that Salina had orchestrated Duran's abduction.

At SuperFight, Duran made his return to MLW; cornering Místico as he defeated Averno, who was managed by Salina. At Intimidation Games, Místico defeated Romero to win the MLW World Middleweight Championship. At War Chamber, Duran issued a challenge to Salina for the two to pit their respective wrestlers in a series of matches. The winning promoter would receive a key to what Duran calls, "the greatest power in lucha libre".

==== Other matches ====
During War Chamber II, which aired on April 20, Davey Boy Smith Jr., Tom Lawlor, and Richard Holliday of the World Titan Federation (WTF) were attacked by members of Contra Unit. Smith and Lawlor were the reigning MLW World Tag Team Champions at the time, but the injuries they sustained in the attack forced MLW to vacate the titles (a storyline explanation for writing off Lawlor, who will miss several MLW events due to obligations with New Japan Pro Wrestling.). A match to determine new champions was announced for Azteca Lucha. The following day, MLW announced that CozyMax (MLW World Heavyweight Champion Satoshi Kojima and Shigeo Okumura) will face The Second Gear Crew (Matthew Justice and 1 Called Manders) for the vacant titles.

At MLW Slaughterhouse in October 2023, Janai Kai, representing Salina de la Renta's Promociones Dorado, defeated Delmi Exo to win the MLW World Women's Featherweight Championship. Exo has unsuccessfully attempted to recapture the title on multiple occasions since then. However, during the Once Upon A Time In New York special, which aired on March 16, 2024, Exo aligned herself with Cesar Duran, and defeated Zayda to become the #1 contender. Despite this, Kai will defend her title against Exo, Zayda, and Miyu Yamashita in a Four-way match during the TV taping portion of the card.

== Results ==
Results
No.	Results	Stipulations	Times
1	Atlantis, Jesús Rodriguez, and Guerrero Maya Jr. (Promociones Dorado) (1) defeated El Felino, Virus, and Villano III Jr. (Azteca Lucha) (0) by submission	Trios match	19:23
2	Bad Dude Tito defeated Rickey Shane Page (c) by pinfall	Singles match for the MLW National Openweight Championship	7:00
3	Atlantis Jr. (Promociones Dorado) (2) defeated Último Guerrero (Azteca Lucha) (0) by pinfall	Singles match	13:05
4	CozyMax (Satoshi Kojima and Shigeo Okumura) defeated The Second Gear Crew (Matthew Justice and 1 Called Manders) by pinfall	Tag team match for the vacant MLW World Tag Team Championship	10:57
5	Matt Riddle defeated Josh Bishop (with Mister Saint Laurent) by pinfall	Singles match	4:29
6	Averno and Magnus (Azteca Lucha) (1) defeated Star Jr. and Fuego (Promociones Dorado) (2) by pinfall	Tag team match	11:55
7	Místico (c) (Azteca Lucha) (2) defeated Bárbaro Cavernario (Promociones Dorado) (2) by submission	Singles match for the MLW World Middleweight Championship	18:37
(c) / – the champion(s) heading into the match

Fury Road (May 18)
No.	Results	Stipulations	Times
1	Jake Crist defeated Brett Ryan Gosselin by pinfall	Singles match	5:08
2	Akira defeated Bobby Fish by pinfall	Singles match	6:38
3	Alex Kane (with Mr. Thomas) defeated A-Game by referee stoppage	Singles match	1:12
4	Mads Krule Krügger defeated Matthew Justice by pinfall	Falls Count Anywhere match	8:24
5	Janai Kai (c) defeated Delmi Exo, Miyu Yamashita, and Zayda by submission	Four-way match for the MLW World Women's Featherweight Championship	6:45
6	Sami Callihan vs. Matt Riddle ended in a double countout	Singles match	7:38
7	Satoshi Kojima (c) (with Okumura) defeated 1 Called Manders by pinfall	Singles match for the MLW World Heavyweight Championship	9:22
(c) / – the champion(s) heading into the match
