= Lucha Apocalypto (2024) =

2024 Major League Wrestling event

- Promotion(s): Major League Wrestling; Consejo Mundial de Lucha Libre
- Date: November 9, 2024 (aired November 10, 2024)
- City: Cicero, Illinois
- Venue: Cicero Stadium

Major League Wrestling event chronology
← Previous; Fightland	Next → Slaughterhouse

Consejo Mundial de Lucha Libre event chronology
← Previous; Tzompantu de Mascaras	Next → Sin Salida

Lucha Apocalypto chronology
← Previous —	Next → 2026

Lucha Apocalypto (2024) was a professional wrestling live streaming event co-produced by Major League Wrestling (MLW) and Consejo Mundial de Lucha Libre (CMLL). It took place on November 9, 2024, at Cicero Stadium in Cicero, Illinois, but aired on tape delay the following day on MLW's YouTube channel due to technical issues.

Additionally, several matches would be taped for the Slaughterhouse special, which was originally meant to take place on October 4 in St. Petersburg, Florida before being canceled due to Hurricane Helene. The special aired on November 23 also on YouTube.

== Production ==
=== Background ===
On September 27, 2023, Major League Wrestling (MLW) announced a strategic partnership with Consejo Mundial de Lucha Libre (CMLL) and New Japan Pro-Wrestling (NJPW) for crossover events and talent exchanges.

On May 9, 2024, MLW announced its first co-promoted event with CMLL, Lucha Apocalypto, would take place on November 9, 2024, at Cicero Stadium in Cicero, Illinois.

The stream was postponed to November 10, 2024 due to technical issues and was aired on tape delay on MLW's YouTube channel.

=== Storylines ===
The card will consist of matches that result from scripted storylines, where wrestlers portray villains, heroes, or less distinguishable characters in scripted events that built tension and culminate in a wrestling match or series of matches, with results predetermined by MLW and CMLL's writers. Storylines are played out at MLW and CMLL events, and across both promotions' social media platforms.

== Results ==
Lucha Apocalypto
No.	Results	Stipulations	Times
1	Último Guerrero and Hechicero defeated Esfinge and Kevin Knight by pinfall	Tag team match	10:37
2	Brett Ryan Gosselin defeated Alex Kane (with Mr. Thomas) by pinfall	Chain match	5:11
3	Janai Kai (c) defeated Lluvia and Persephone by submission	Three-way match for the MLW World Women's Featherweight Championship	8:28
4	Matthew Justice defeated Bad Dude Tito (c) (with Jesús Rodriguez) by pinfall	Falls Count Anywhere match for the MLW National Openweight Championship	10:22
5	Contra Unit (Minoru Suzuki and Ikuro Kwon) (c) vs. Satoshi Kojima and Matt Riddle ended in a no contest	Tag team match for the MLW World Tag Team Championship	7:08
6	Atlantis, Atlantis Jr., and Star Jr. defeated Bárbaro Cavernario, Magnus, and Felino by pinfall	Trios match	12:49
7	Místico (c) defeated Titán and Averno by submission	Three-way match for the MLW World Middleweight Championship	23:26
(c) / – the champion(s) heading into the match

Slaughterhouse (November 23)
No.	Results	Stipulations	Times
1	The Andersons (C.W. Anderson and Brock Anderson) defeated The Bomaye Fight Club (Alex Kane and Mr. Thomas)	Tables match	5:15
2	Okumura defeated Ikuro Kwon by pinfall	Singles match	3:32
3	Kenta defeated Paul London by pinfall	Singles match	10:25
4	Donovan Dijak (with Saint Laurent) defeated Kevin Knight (with Mr. Thomas) by pinfall	Singles match	6:38
5	Delmi Exo defeated Gigi Rey by pinfall	Singles match	3:54
6	Matt Riddle defeated Minoru Suzuki by pinfall	Singles match	6:02
7	Satoshi Kojima (c) (with Okumura) defeated Bobby Fish by pinfall	Singles match for the MLW World Heavyweight Championship	6:45
8	Mads Krule Krügger defeated Akira by pinfall	Weapons of Mass Destruction match	8:14
(c) / – the champion(s) heading into the match
