= Lucha Apocalypto (2026) =

2026 Major League Wrestling event

- Promotion(s): Major League Wrestling; Consejo Mundial de Lucha Libre
- Date: February 7, 2026 (aired June 6‒June 20, 2026)
- City: Cicero, Illinois
- Venue: Cicero Stadium
- Attendance: ~1500

Event chronology
← Previous; Battle Riot VIII	Next → Fantastica Mania USA

Lucha Apocalypto chronology
← Previous; 2024	Next → —

Lucha Apocalypto (2026) was a professional wrestling event co-produced by Major League Wrestling (MLW) and Consejo Mundial de Lucha Libre (CMLL) that took place on February 7, 2026, at the Cicero Stadium in Cicero, Illinois. The event served as a taping for MLW Fusion.

== Production ==
=== Background ===
Lucha Apocalypto is a reoccurring professional wrestling supercard event produced by MLW and CMLL that was first held on November 9, 2024. The first event would air live on November 9, 2024, but the stream was postponed to November 10, 2024, due to technical issues and was aired on tape delay on MLW's YouTube channel.

On May 8, 2025, MLW announced that Lucha Apocalypto would take place on November 15, 2025, at the Cicero Stadium in Cicero, Illinois. This will be the second consecutive Lucha Apocalypto held at the venue, following 2025. On August 15, 2025, MLW announced that Lucha Apocalypto would be rescheduled to February 7, 2026.

=== Storylines ===
The card consisted of matches that result from scripted storylines, where wrestlers portrayed villains, heroes, or less distinguishable characters in scripted events that built tension and culminate in a wrestling match or series of matches, with results predetermined by MLW's writers. Storylines were played out at MLW events, and across the league's social media platforms.

== Results ==
No.	Results	Stipulations	Times
1	Shotzi Blackheart defeated Shoko Nakajima (c) by pinfall	Singles match for the MLW Women's Featherweight Championship (Fusion – June 6)	11:55
2	Místico defeated Diego Hill (with Blue Panther) by pinfall	Singles match (Fusion – June 6)	9:56
3	The Skyscrapers (Bishop Dyer and Donovan Dijak) (c) defeated The Good Brothers (Doc Gallows and Karl Anderson)	Tables match for the MLW World Tag Team Championship (Fusion – June 6)	11:19
4	Kushida (c) (with Okumura) defeated Alan Angels by submission	Singles match for the MLW World Middleweight Championship (Fusion – June 13)	10:14
5	Josh Bishop defeated Matthew Justice by pinfall	Street Fight (Fusion – June 13)	8:57
6	Killer Kross (c) (with Scarlett Bordeaux) vs. Matt Riddle ended in a no contest	Singles match for the MLW World Heavyweight Championship (Fusion – June 13)	13:52
7	Soberano Jr. defeated Neón by pinfall	Singles match (Fusion – June 20)	10:25
8	Okumura (with Kushida) defeated Victor Iniestra by submission	Singles match (Fusion – June 20)	1:24
9	Scarlett Bordeaux defeated Blair Onyx by pinfall	Singles match (Fusion – June 20)	2:39
10	Alex Hammerstone defeated Último Guerrero by pinfall	Singles match (Fusion – June 20)	7:39
11	Austin Aries defeated Blue Panther (c) (with Diego Hill) by submission	Singles match for the MLW National Openweight Championship (Fusion – June 20)	5:51
12	Zamaya defeated Lili Ruiz by pinfall	Singles match (Fusion – June 20)	1:27
13	Místico defeated Templario by submisson	Singles match (Fusion – June 20)	20:54
14	Mads Krule Krügger (with Shotzi Blackheart) defeated Bishop Dyer by pinfall	Singles match (Fusion – June 20)	4:46
(c) / – the champion(s) heading into the match
