= MLW Azteca Underground =

2022 Major League Wrestling professional wrestling event

Azteca Underground
- Promotional poster of the event
- Promotion: Major League Wrestling
- Date: April 1, 2022
- City: Dallas, Texas
- Venue: Gilley's Dallas

Event chronology
← Previous; Intimidation Games	Next → Kings of Colosseum

Azteca chronology
← Previous; MLW Azteca/The Crash show	Next → MLW Azteca Lucha

Azteca Underground was a professional wrestling supercard event produced by Major League Wrestling (MLW), which took place on April 1, 2022, at Gilley's Dallas in Dallas, Texas. The event was a television taping for MLW Fusion on MLW's YouTube channel; the main event aired as part of the Rise of the Renegades special on June 9, 2022.

It was the second event held under the MLW Azteca banner, following the MLW Azteca/The Crash show in 2021, and the second of two MLW events to take place in Texas; the other being Intimidation Games.

== Production ==
=== Background ===
Other on-screen personnel
Role:	Name:
Commentators	Joe Dombrowski
Commentators	Rich Bocchini

In October 2020, MLW began incorporating story elements from the defunct Lucha Libre promotion and former television drama, Lucha Underground. Talent that was formerly associated with Lucha Underground (such as King Muertes, Jeff Cobb, and Swerve Strickland; the latter returning to MLW at the previous night's Intimidation Games.) were brought into MLW as part of the "Azteca Underground" stable, with the concept considered to be a spiritual successor to the former.

On February 4, 2022, MLW announced that an Azteca Underground event would be held on April 1 at Gilley's Dallas in Dallas, Texas.

=== Storylines ===
The card will consist of matches that resulted from scripted storylines, where wrestlers portrayed villains, heroes, or less distinguishable characters in scripted events that built tension and culminated in a wrestling match or series of matches, with results predetermined by MLW's writers. Storylines were played out on MLW's weekly series, Fusion, as well as the MLW Fusion: Alpha and MLW Azteca mini-series.

On the February 24 episode of Fusion, Aramis, El Dragón, and Microman defeated Arez, Mini Abismo Negro, and Gino Medina in a Trios match. Backstage, however, a frustrated Medina attacked and blooded Aramis. MLW.com reported that MLW matchmaker and Azteca Underground owner Cesar Duran gave Medina a pay bonus for the incident. On March 17, it was announced that at Azteca Underground, Aramis and Medina will face off in a Mexican Strap match (a lumberjack match where the surrounding wrestlers and luchadores wield leather straps that they can whip the participants with).

On December 9 episode of MLW Fusion: Alpha, nZo defeated Matt Cross in his debut match. After the match, nZo would bump into KC Navarro on the entrance ramp during the latter's entrance. Believing it to be a sign of disrespect, nZo would go on to attack and severely injure Navarro. The two would have a match at SuperFight, which nZo won. nZo would cut a promo on Navarro after the match, appearing to show respect, but would instead further attack Navarro. On March 23, it was announced that nZo and Navarro will face off again at Azteca Underground.

On the February 10, 2022 Fusion season premiere, Alexander Hammerstone retained the MLW World Heavyweight Championship against Pagano in a falls count anywhere match. After the match, Alexander would be joined by his Dynasty stablemate Richard Holliday, and MLW interviewer Alicia Atout. As Atout would try and conduct an interview with Hammerstone, she suddenly gave Hammerstone a low blow before Holliday attacked him as well. Atout would then give the championship to Holliday before the two kissed, with the two officially turning heel, and the latter disbanding The Dynasty in the process. On the following episode, Holiday explained he was only pretending to be Hammerstone's friend. It was further revealed at the end of the February 24 episode of Fusion that Holiday had been working with Cesar Duran to defeat Contra Unit (including joining "The Hammerheads" team against Contra at the 2021 War Chamber match) in order to help the latter gain more power in MLW in exchange for a World title shot. On the March 10 Fusion SuperFight special, Hammerstone would successfully retain the title against Opera Cup champion Davey Richards, despite Holliday's attempts at injuring Richards the week prior via a bounty, but Holliday attacked Hammerstone after the match. Duran then threatened to strip Hammerstone of the World Heavyweight Championship, as he had not been heard from since the attack, but Hammerstone would return to attack Holliday on the March 24 episode of Fusion. On March 24, it was announced that Hammerstone would team with The Von Erichs (Marshall Von Erich and Ross Von Erich) in a Trios match against Holliday, Muertes, and Mads Krügger at Azteca Underground.

MLW matchmaker and Azteca Underground owner Cesar Duran has been in a feud with MLW World Heavyweight Champion Alexander Hammerstone since the latter defeated Jacob Fatu to win the title at Fightland in October 2021. On the premiere episode of the MLW Azteza mini-series, seen on January 6, 2022, Duran had Pagano attack Hammerstone after the two won a tag team match before men in Azteca Underground masks carried the former away; Richard Holliday would rescue Hammerstone on the January 13 episode of Azteca. Duran would continue to antagonize The Dynasty throughout the events of the mini-series up until the season premiere of MLW Fusion; when Holliday attacked Hammerstone after the latter's title defense against Pagano. On March 29, 2022, it was announced on MLW.com that, in addition to his Trios match, Hammerstone would face Cesar Duran in a No Holds Barred match at Azteca Underground.

== Results ==
No.	Results	Stipulations	Times
1	Hustle and Power (EJ Nduka and Calvin Tankman) defeated Budd Heavy and Red Pickins	Tag team match	1:20
2	Octagón Jr. (c) defeated Matt Cross	Singles match for the MLW Caribbean Heavyweight Championship	9:01
3	Alex Kane (c) (with Mr. Thomas) defeated Puma King, A. C. H., Myron Reed, and Juicy Finau	Five-way match for the MLW National Openweight Championship	4:28
4	Davey Richards defeated Danny Rivera (with Julius Smokes)	Singles match	8:29
5	Alexander Hammerstone (c) defeated Cesar Duran via disqualification	Singles match for the MLW World Heavyweight Championship	4:10
6	King Muertes, Mads Krügger, and Richard Holliday (with Alicia Atout) defeated The Von Hammers (Alexander Hammerstone, Marshall Von Erich, and Ross Von Erich)	Six-man tag team match	9:31
7	Bandido defeated Flamita	Singles match	12:13
8	Holidead (with Dr. Dax) defeated Chik Tormenta	Singles match	4:07
9	Aero Star, El Dragón, and Microman defeated Strange Sangre (Arez, Mini Abismo Negro, and TJP) (with Dr. Dax, Holidead, and Gangrel)	Trios match	10:36
10	KC Navarro defeated nZo	Singles match	1:50
11	Gino Medina defeated Aramis	Mexican Strap match	5:37
12	Jacob Fatu defeated Bestia 666	Azteca Apocalypto match	9:41
(c) / – the champion(s) heading into the match
