= Slaughterhouse (2024 event) =

2024 Major League Wrestling event

Slaughterhouse (2024)
- Promotional poster of the event
- Promotion: Major League Wrestling
- Date: November 9, 2024 (aired November 23, 2024)
- City: Cicero, Illinois
- Venue: Cicero Stadium

Event chronology
← Previous; Lucha Apocalypto	Next → Eric Bischoff's One Shot

Slaughterhouse chronology
← Previous; 2023	Next → 2025

Slaughterhouse (2024) was a professional wrestling event produced by Major League Wrestling (MLW). It was originally scheduled to take place on October 4, 2024, at The Coliseum in St. Petersburg, Florida. MLW canceled the event due to Hurricane Helene. The event's name was repurposed as a TV special that aired on beIN Sports and MLW's YouTube channel, with matches being taped at Lucha Apocalypto on November 9, 2024. It was the second event in the Slaughterhouse chronology.

== Production ==
=== Background ===
Slaugherhouse is an event produced by Major League Wrestling (MLW) that was first held in 2023. Its name originated from a 2019 special episode of the promotion's television series, MLW Fusion, called "Jimmy Havoc's Slaughterhouse".

On July 10, 2024, MLW announced that a second Slaughterhouse event would take place on October 4, 2024, at The Coliseum in St. Petersburg, Florida. On September 27, MLW announced that the 2024 Slaughterhouse event would be canceled due to Hurricane Helene.

It was announced on November 10, 2024, that the event would return as a TV special that would air on beIN Sports and MLW's YouTube channel on November 23, 2024; with matches being taped as part of Lucha Apocalypto on November 9 at Cicero Stadium in Cicero, Illinois.

=== Storylines ===
The card consisted of matches that result from scripted storylines, where wrestlers portrayed villains, heroes, or less distinguishable characters in scripted events that built tension and culminate in a wrestling match or series of matches, with results predetermined by MLW's writers. Storylines were played out at MLW events, and across the league's social media platforms.

In addition to talent from partner promotions, such as Consejo Mundial de Lucha Libre (CMLL), several freelance wrestlers would be announced for the event per MLW's "Open Door Policy". On September 9, MLW announced that Trevor Lee (formerly Cameron Grimes in WWE) would make his debut for the promotion at Slaughterhouse.

At the CMLL 91st Anniversary Show on September 13, 2024, MLW World Heavyweight Champion Satoshi Kojima and Último Guerrero were on opposite sides of a trios match, where the latter's team came out victorious. Two days later, Guerrero released a video package where he called out Kojima for an MLW World Heavyweight Title match. MLW would officially announce the match the following day for Slaughterhouse.

== Matches ==
No.	Results	Stipulations	Times
1	The Andersons (C.W. Anderson and Brock Anderson) defeated The Bomaye Fight Club (Alex Kane and Mr. Thomas)	Tables match	5:15
2	Okumura defeated Ikuro Kwon by pinfall	Singles match	3:32
3	Kenta defeated Paul London by pinfall	Singles match	10:25
4	Donovan Dijak (with Saint Laurent) defeated Kevin Knight (with Mr. Thomas) by pinfall	Singles match	6:38
5	Delmi Exo defeated Gigi Rey by pinfall	Singles match	3:54
6	Matt Riddle defeated Minoru Suzuki by pinfall	Singles match	6:02
7	Satoshi Kojima (c) (with Okumura) defeated Bobby Fish by pinfall	Singles match for the MLW World Heavyweight Championship	6:45
8	Mads Krule Krügger defeated Akira by pinfall	Weapons of Mass Destruction match	8:14
(c) / – the champion(s) heading into the match

== Cancelled Matches ==
Slaughterhouse
No.	Matches*	Stipulations
1	Contra Unit (Minoru Suzuki and Ikuro Kwon) (c) vs. The Bomaye Fight Club (Alex Kane and Mr. Thomas)	Tag team match for the MLW World Tag Team Championship
2	Trevor Lee vs. Donovan Dijak (with Mister Saint Laurent)	Singles match
3	Bad Dude Tito (c) (with Jesús Rodríguez) vs. Matthew Justice (with Bill Alfonso)	Singles match for the MLW National Openweight Championship
4	Akira vs. Mads Krule Krügger	Weapons of Mass Destruction match
5	Satoshi Kojima (c) vs. Último Guerrero	Singles match for the MLW World Heavyweight Championship
(c) / – the champion(s) heading into the match; *Card subject to change

TV taping
No.	Matches*	Stipulations
1	Kenta vs. Paul London vs. Bobby Fish	Three-way match
2	Místico (c) vs. Averno	Singles match for the MLW World Middleweight Championship
3	Matt Riddle vs. Minoru Suzuki	Singles match
(c) / – the champion(s) heading into the match; *Card subject to change
