= Montel Vontavious Porter =

American professional wrestler (born 1973)

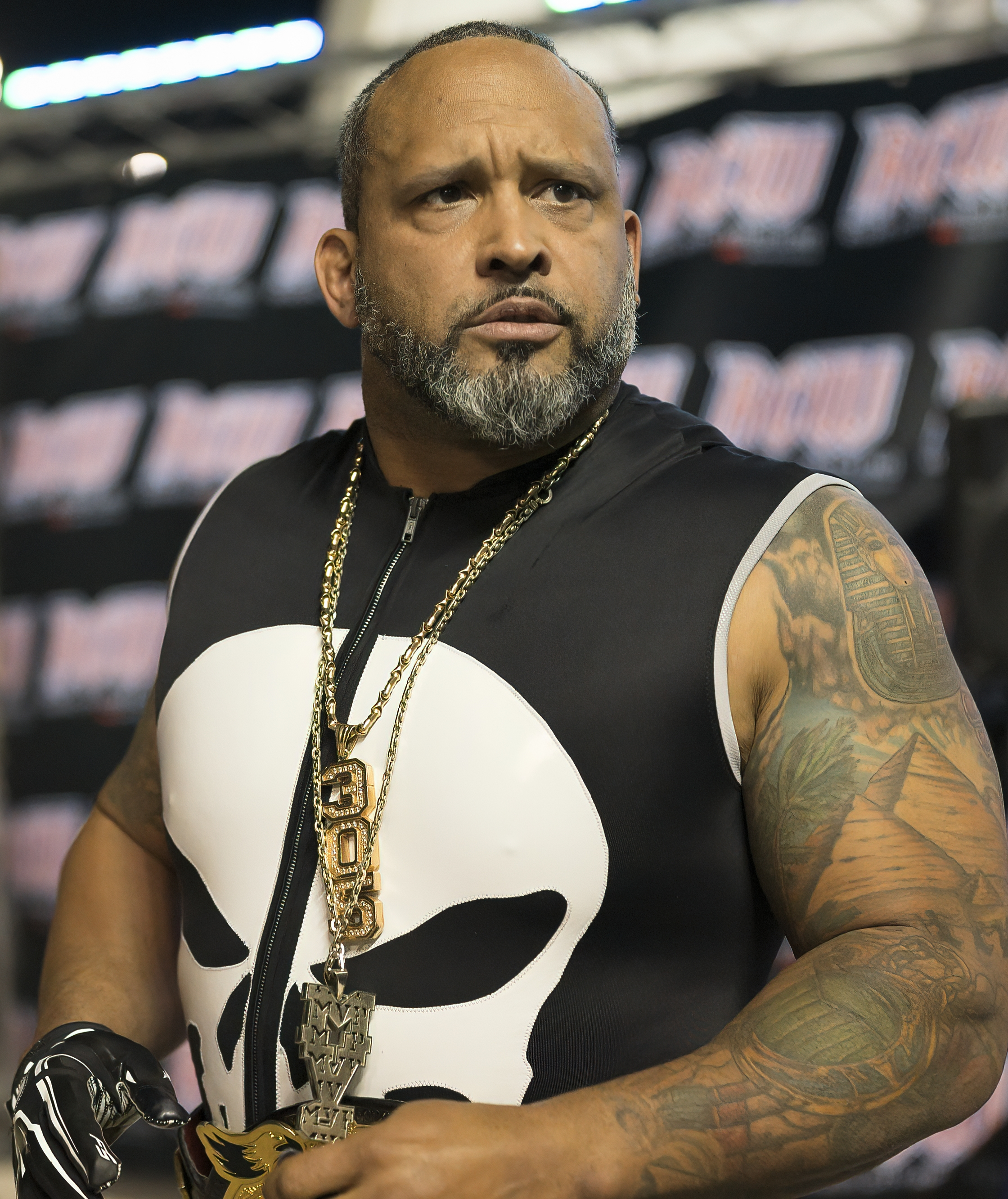
- MVP in 2019

Personal information
- Born: Alvin Burke Jr. October 28, 1973 (age 52) Liberty City, Florida, U.S.
- Children: 1

Professional wrestling career
- Ring name(s): Antonio Banks; Antonio Bank$ Lord of War; Montel Vontavious Porter; MVP
- Billed height: 6 ft 3 in (191 cm)
- Billed weight: 259 lb (117 kg)
- Billed from: Miami, Florida
- Trained by: Soulman Alex G Norman Smiley
- Debut: June 29, 1999

Hassan Hamid Assad (born Alvin Antonio Burke Jr.; October 28, 1973), better known by his ring name Montel Vontavious Porter or simply MVP, is an American professional wrestler, manager, Brazilian jiu-jitsu practitioner and rapper. He is signed to All Elite Wrestling (AEW), where he is the on-screen manager of The Hurt Syndicate. He is also known for his work in WWE, Total Nonstop Action Wrestling (TNA), and New Japan Pro-Wrestling (NJPW).

After concluding his training under Soulman Alex G and Norman Smiley, MVP began wrestling for numerous independent promotions, including a stint in TNA. He won various championships in singles competition. He first signed with WWE in 2005 and was assigned to Deep South Wrestling, one of the company's developmental territories at the time. After being promoted to the SmackDown brand, he made his main roster debut in October 2006, and became two-time WWE United States Champion, with his first reign being the longest in SmackDown history at 343 days. He is also a former one-time WWE Tag Team Champion with Matt Hardy.

After his departure from WWE in 2010, MVP joined New Japan Pro-Wrestling in 2011 and spent the next two years there, becoming a one-time (and the inaugural) IWGP Intercontinental Champion. He subsequently returned to the independent circuit and made appearances in TNA and ROH. He returned to WWE in January 2020 and left in August 2024, debuting in AEW the following month.

== Early life ==
Alvin Antonio Burke Jr. was born in the Liberty City neighborhood of Miami, Florida, on October 28, 1973. He grew up in Opa-locka, Florida. His father was a police officer. He joined a gang when he was 12, describing it as a "graffiti gang" which later turned into a street gang. He spent six months in a juvenile detention center after a robbery, and was later sentenced to 18 and a half years behind bars for armed robbery and kidnapping, of which he served nine and a half years starting at age 16. He converted to Islam while in prison, but is now an atheist.

== Professional wrestling career ==
=== Early career (1999–2005) ===
Assad entered the professional wrestling business through the help of a corrections officer in his prison who also worked as a wrestler in the independent circuit. After being trained by former professional wrestlers Soulman Alex G and Norman Smiley, Assad made his wrestling debut in 2002. He worked for many different companies on the independent circuit using the name Antonio Banks, including appearances with Full Impact Pro (FIP) and Future of Wrestling (FOW), where he won the latter's Tag Team Championship with Punisher. During his time in FIP, he wrestled Homicide for the World Heavyweight Championship at the Ring of Honor show Do or Die IV on February 19, 2005, but did not win the title. He also made sporadic appearances for Total Nonstop Action Wrestling (TNA), and wrestled on the April 20, 2003, episode of TNA Xplosion. He appeared again for TNA on the August 6, 2004, episode of Impact!, with Sal Rinauro as his tag team partner, losing to America's Most Wanted. He also wrestled for Coastal Championship Wrestling (CCW) and Elite Wrestling Entertainment in 2005, competing against wrestlers like Jerry Lynn and D'Lo Brown. In CCW, he won the Heavyweight Championship on August 20, 2005, by defeating Blackhart and Bruno Sassi in a three-way match.

=== World Wrestling Entertainment (2005–2010) ===
==== Deep South Wrestling (2005–2006) ====
In 2005, after a number of live events and dark matches, Assad signed a developmental contract with World Wrestling Entertainment (WWE) and was assigned to their developmental territory Deep South Wrestling. He originally wrestled under his "Antonio Banks" ring name, but then developed the Montel Vontavious Porter (MVP) in-ring persona: an arrogant, self-obsessed athlete. He was also on an episode of SmackDown! on January 13, 2005, being one of the police officers in the ring with Kurt Angle.

==== Feuding with Kane (2006–2007) ====
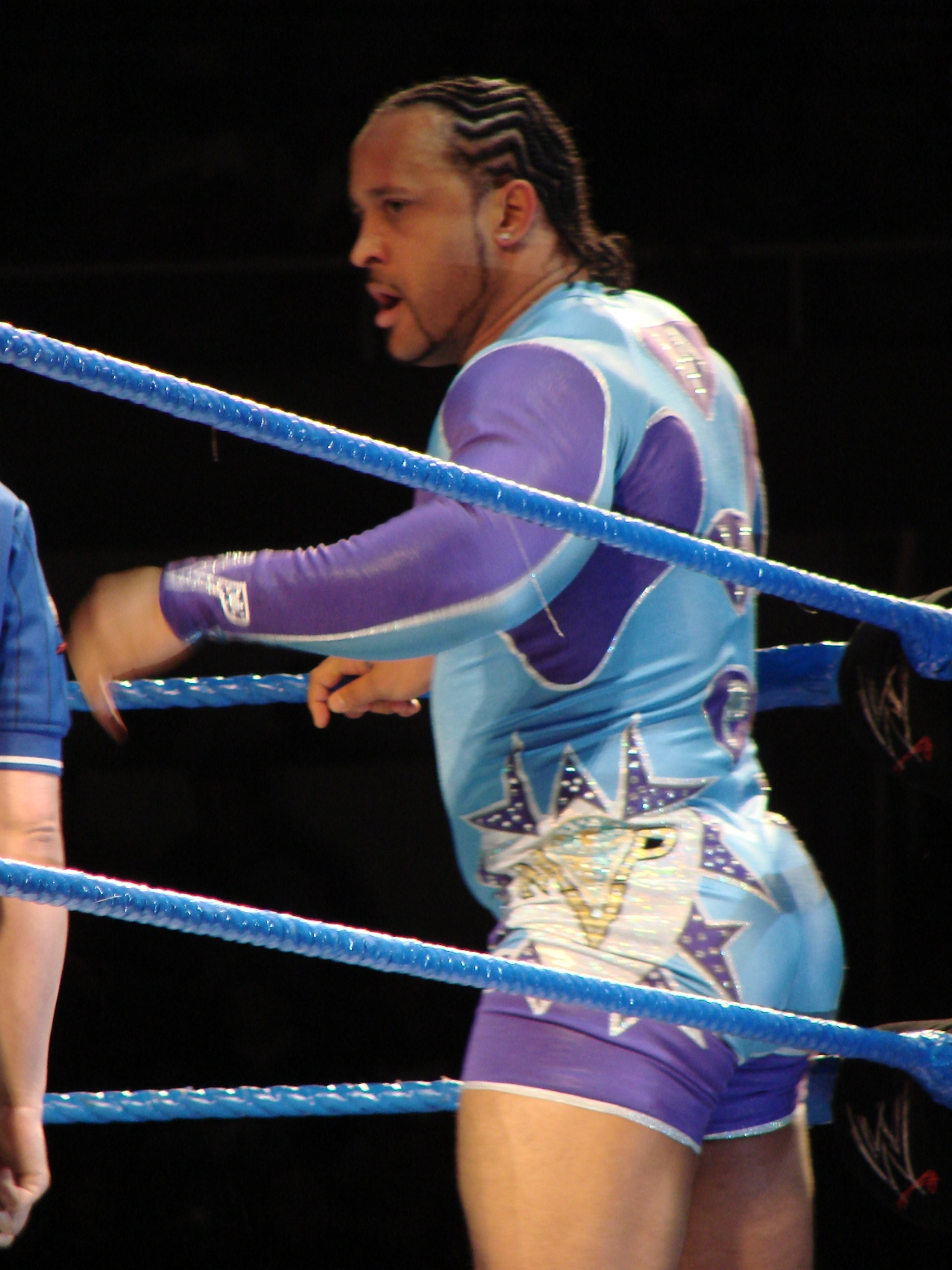
MVP during a SmackDown! house show

As MVP, he made his first appearance on WWE television on the August 4, 2006 episode of SmackDown!, during which announcers described him as a coveted free agent. The initial angle involved MVP appearing backstage and in arena crowds, often flanked by women and/or a bodyguard, and talking to SmackDown! General Manager Theodore Long about the contract his (unseen) agent was supposedly aggressively negotiating. Throughout his segments, commentators described MVP as arrogant, noting that he would stop conversations in the middle to answer his mobile phone or admire his own jewelry while people were speaking to him. Finally, on September 26, a video of a press conference announcing the signing of MVP to "the largest contract in SmackDown! history" was uploaded to WWE.com.

MVP made his in-ring debut at No Mercy on October 8 as a heel with a ring entrance featuring an NFL-like inflatable tunnel, before defeating Marty Garner. During the match, commentators Michael Cole and John "Bradshaw" Layfield (JBL) decried the choice of opponent, since it had been implied that it would be someone "more competent", and joined in with fans mocking his athletic suit styled ring gear, calling him "pathetic" while the fans chanted Power Ranger. On the following episode of SmackDown!, MVP made a demand for a tougher opponent to prove his mettle, which was answered by Kane making his SmackDown! debut. The two feuded for the next two months, with MVP narrowly scoring wins over Kane in a Street Fight, a Steel Cage match and tag team matches with Mr. Kennedy against the reunited Brothers of Destruction, before losing to Kane in an Inferno match at Armageddon on December 17, from which he suffered storyline first-degree burns. Because of the burns he was "out of action" for a short time, during which on the December 22 episode of SmackDown!, color commentator JBL expressed rage with the fans for cheering a match where the only way of achieving victory is to set an opponent on fire.

==== United States Champion (2007–2009) ====
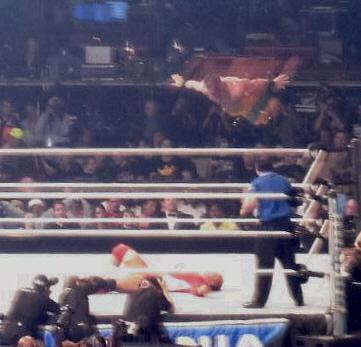
MVP made his WrestleMania debut against Chris Benoit at the 23rd iteration of the event

When his feud with Kane ended, MVP began a feud with the WWE United States Champion Chris Benoit over Benoit's title. During the buildup for a title match with Benoit, MVP appeared on SmackDown! introducing various supposed champions from around the world, defeating them in squash matches. MVP lost to Benoit at WrestleMania 23 on April 1, 2007 and at Backlash on April 29, but finally defeated Benoit in a Two out of three falls match at Judgment Day on May 20, with MVP winning the United States Championship, his first WWE title, in two straight falls. MVP credits his time working with Benoit for improving his in-ring skill. In his first pay-per-view championship defense at Vengeance: Night of Champions on June 24, MVP defeated Ric Flair to retain the title.

His first major feud as the champion was against Matt Hardy, whom he started claiming to be better than at everything, after defeating him at The Great American Bash on July 22. When MVP was legitimately diagnosed with the heart condition Wolff–Parkinson–White syndrome, it was written into the storyline, with MVP blaming the condition for his losing an arm wrestling match against Hardy on the August 3 episode of SmackDown!. When MVP was given an interview segment during SmackDown!, the VIP Lounge, it was used to bow out of a scheduled boxing match on the August 18 episode of Saturday Night's Main Event—with Evander Holyfield replacing him, and eventually punching out MVP during the bout. On the August 24 episode of SmackDown!, MVP bragged to General Manager Theodore Long that he was so good, he could win the WWE Tag Team Championship with anybody, prompting Long to grant him a championship match alongside the next person who entered the room, who turned out to be Hardy. The following week on the August 31 episode of SmackDown!, MVP and Hardy won the WWE Tag Team Championship from Deuce 'n Domino, making MVP a double champion. MVP and Hardy's contentious relationship had them competing with each other in various ways while MVP proclaimed himself "Captain" of the team. In the months coming, MVP started getting along better with Hardy, including helping him defeat Finlay on the October 19 episode of SmackDown!.

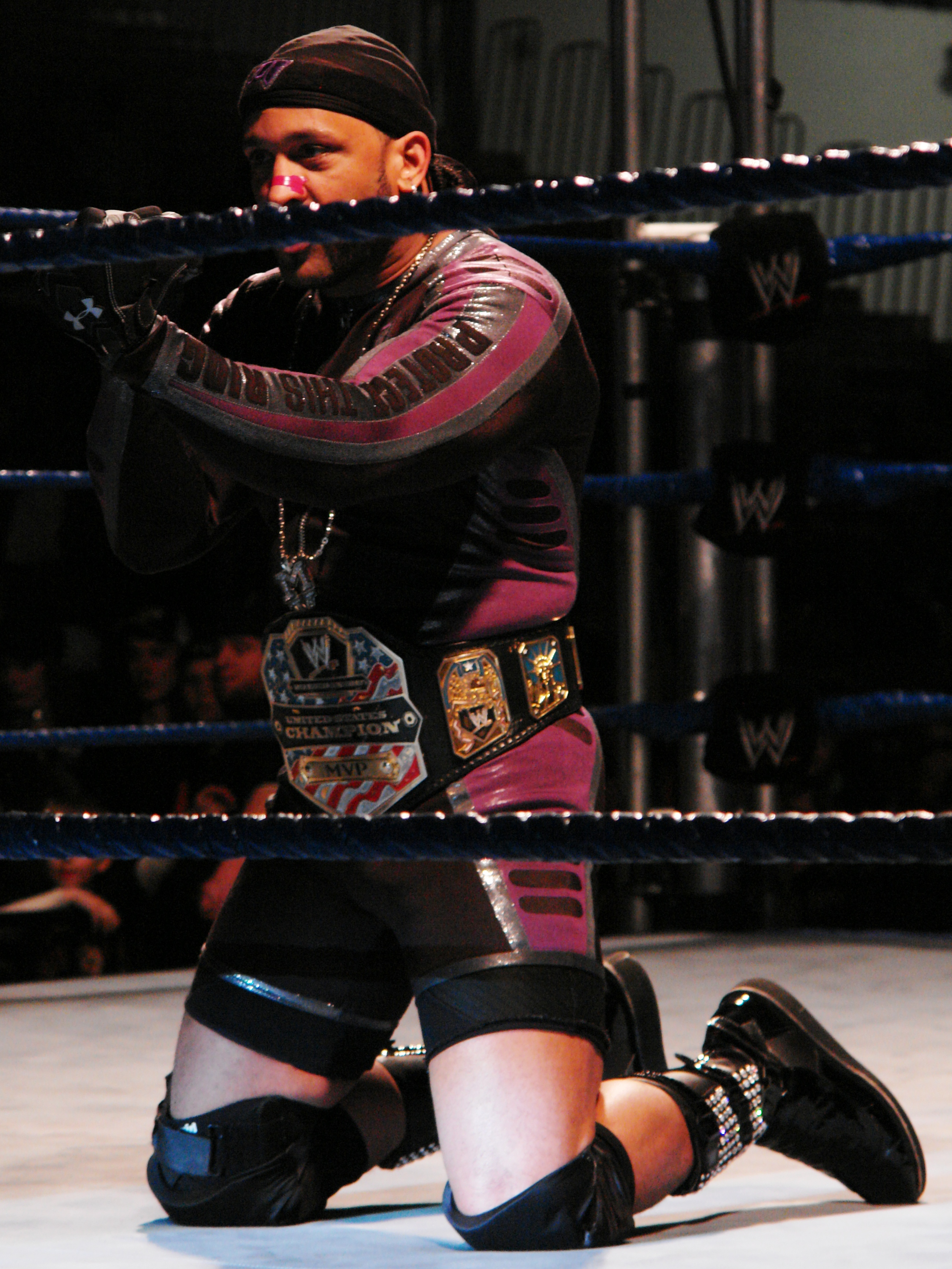
MVP as the United States Champion in 2008

Their reign together came to an end on the November 16 episode of SmackDown! after Hardy demanded a shot at the United States Championship, but MVP declined, and announced they had a WWE Tag Team Championship defense against John Morrison and the Miz instead. They lost the match and the titles, and immediately afterwards, MVP invoked the rematch clause, but they lost that match as well. MVP then attacked Hardy, targeting his knee, which in storyline had been injured during the matches, and put him "out of action". Hardy suffered a legitimate ruptured appendix while he was off television, putting their feud on hold. While Hardy recovered, MVP engaged in short feuds with Rey Mysterio (losing a title match by countout at Armageddon on December 16) and Ric Flair (losing a career threatening match at the Royal Rumble on January 27, 2008). At No Way Out on February 17, he competed in the SmackDown Elimination Chamber match for a World Heavyweight Championship opportunity at WrestleMania XXIV on March 30, but was eliminated by Finlay after The Undertaker chokeslammed him off the top of a chamber pod. He would instead participate in the Money in the Bank ladder match at WrestleMania, and during the match, Hardy made an unannounced return and knocked MVP from the ladder with his signature Twist of Fate maneuver, costing him the match and reigniting their feud. At Backlash on April 27, MVP lost the United States Championship to Hardy, ending his record reign at 343 days, which was at the time the longest reign of the WWE era, and the third longest in the entire history of the championship (the record has since broken by Dean Ambrose in 2014). He then subsequently failed to regain the championship in a rematch on the May 2 episode of SmackDown.

Beginning on the August 29 episode of SmackDown, MVP developed a losing streak that lasted over five months, losing in both singles and tag team matches. At Unforgiven on September 7, he challenged for the WWE Championship in the Championship Scramble match, but was unsuccessful, continuing his losing streak. The losing streak meant that, in storyline, MVP did not receive "his contract incentive bonus", and also was no longer allowed his usual entrance with the NFL-like inflatable tunnel. During this losing streak he had a short feud with The Great Khali. On the January 16, 2009 episode of SmackDown, MVP finally broke the losing streak by defeating Big Show in a Last Man Standing match with help from Triple H, as he was fighting to ensure that Triple H would be allowed to compete in the Royal Rumble match at the Royal Rumble on January 25, in the process turning him face for the first time in his career. On the 500th episode of SmackDown on March 20, MVP won the United States Championship for the second time by defeating Shelton Benjamin. At WrestleMania 25 on April 5, MVP competed in the Money in the Bank ladder match for the second year in a row, but failed to win.

==== Teaming with Mark Henry and departure (2009–2010) ====
On the April 13 episode of Raw, MVP was drafted as the first overall pick to the Raw brand as a part of the 2009 WWE draft. As a result of being the reigning WWE United States Champion, he transferred the title to Raw for the first time in history. He lost the title to Kofi Kingston on the June 1 episode of Raw, before beginning a feud with Jack Swagger, which culminated in a match at SummerSlam on August 23, which MVP won. He then formed a tag team with Mark Henry, and they challenged Jeri-Show (Chris Jericho and Big Show) for the Unified WWE Tag Team Championship at the Breaking Point pay-per-view on September 13, but they failed to win the championship. At Survivor Series on November 22, MVP and Henry made up part of Team Kofi, competing against Team Orton in a 5-on-5 tag team elimination match. Although both MVP and Henry were eliminated, Team Kofi would go onto to win the match.

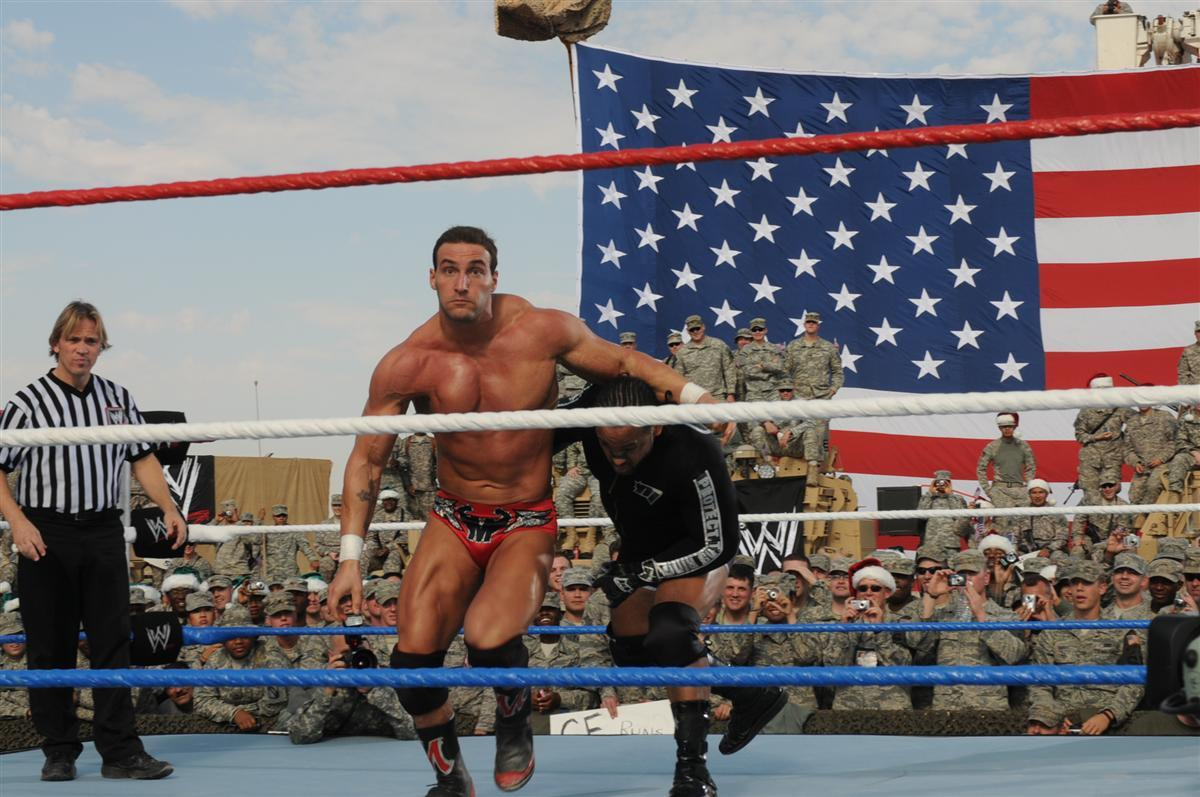
MVP wrestling Chris Masters in December 2009

After beginning a feud with The Miz, MVP faced him for the WWE United States Championship at the Royal Rumble on January 31, 2010, but was unable to win. After the match, both also participated in the Royal Rumble match itself. MVP entered 14th and was surprise-attacked by The Miz (who was not yet an official entrant) who hit him with the United States title belt. MVP later recovered and entered the match (having not been eliminated) to eliminate both himself and The Miz. MVP challenged The Miz for the title a second time at the Elimination Chamber pay-per-view on February 21 but was once again unable to win after interference from Big Show. He also competed in the Money in the Bank ladder match at WrestleMania XXVI on March 28, but was unable to win.

As part of the 2010 WWE supplemental draft, MVP was drafted back to the SmackDown brand. He made his SmackDown return on the April 30 episode, interrupting CM Punk's promo, and later teaming up with Rey Mysterio to defeat Punk and Luke Gallows. On June 1, MVP was announced as the mentor of Percy Watson for the second season of WWE NXT; Watson was eliminated from the competition on August 17, finishing fifth overall. On the November 5 episode of SmackDown, MVP fought in a triple threat match for the number one contendership of Dolph Ziggler's Intercontinental Championship against Cody Rhodes and Drew McIntyre. The match was won by MVP, and the championship match was set for the following week's SmackDown, but MVP was unsuccessful in winning the title. MVP was announced as part of Team Mysterio, teaming with Rey Mysterio, Big Show, Chris Masters and Kofi Kingston to take on Team Del Rio (Alberto Del Rio, Tyler Reks, Jack Swagger, Drew McIntyre and Cody Rhodes) at Survivor Series on November 21. At Survivor Series, MVP was the first man eliminated in the match by McIntyre, who was aided by Del Rio holding MVP's foot down so he could not kick out. MVP's team was able to win the match with Rey Mysterio and Big Show being sole survivors. MVP's last match with the WWE aired on the December 3 episode of SmackDown, teaming with Kaval in a losing effort against Drew McIntyre and Dolph Ziggler; afterward, he and Kaval were attacked by Kane. MVP was released from his WWE contract earlier on December 2.

=== New Japan Pro-Wrestling (2011–2013) ===
In 2011, Assad signed a one-year contract with New Japan Pro-Wrestling, pursuing his noted passion for puroresu. TMZ reported that Assad's prior convictions had made it difficult for him to acquire a visa but that he would be debuting in February. As WWE owned the rights to the name Montel Vontavious Porter, but not MVP, Assad was able to continue working under the abbreviated ring name. In storyline MVP was brought in to the promotion by Nosawa Rongai, who wanted him to join the villainous Kojima-gun, led by Satoshi Kojima. In his debut match for the promotion on February 20 at The New Beginning, MVP teamed with fellow Kojima-gun member Taichi to defeat Togi Makabe and Tomoaki Honma in a tag team match by making Honma submit to his Take it to the Bank crucifix neck crank. On March 6, MVP entered the 2011 New Japan Cup, used to determine the new number one contender to the IWGP Heavyweight Championship, defeating Karl Anderson in his first round match. On March 19, MVP suffered his first loss in New Japan, when he was defeated by Togi Makabe in the second round of the New Japan Cup. The following day, MVP achieved a major victory when he tapped IWGP Heavyweight Champion Hiroshi Tanahashi out with the TTB in a tag team match, where he teamed with Satoshi Kojima and Tanahashi with Hirooki Goto. On May 3, the returning Minoru Suzuki took over as the new leader of Kojima-gun, after its members Taichi and Taka Michinoku had turned on Satoshi Kojima.

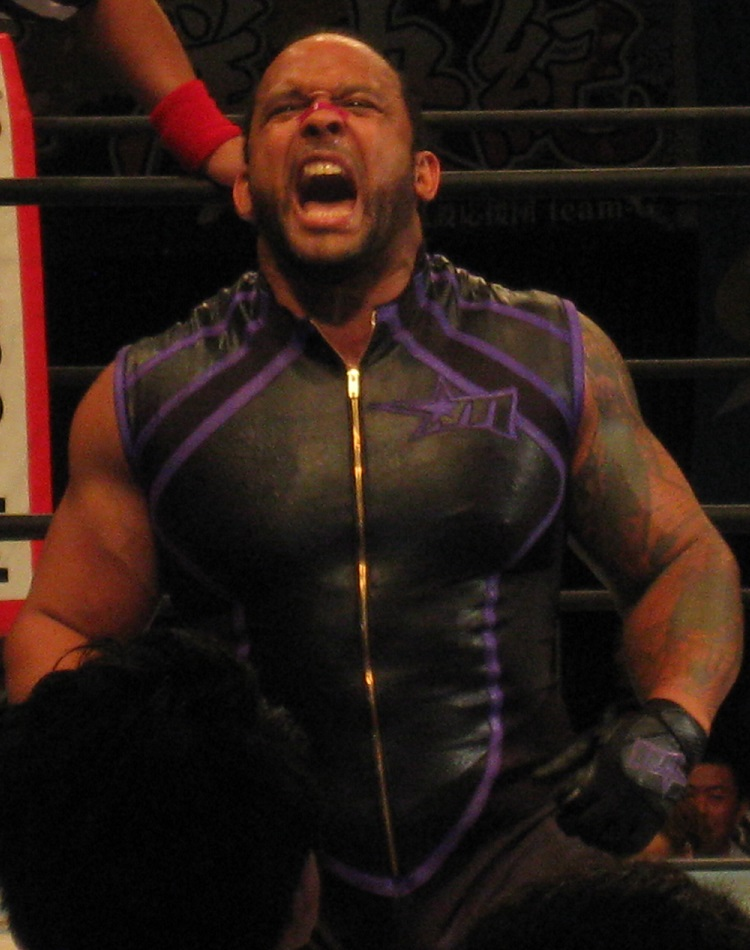
MVP in New Japan Pro-Wrestling in June 2011

In May 2011, MVP took part in the Invasion Tour 2011, New Japan's first tour of the United States. On May 13 in Rahway, New Jersey, he entered the tournament to determine the first ever IWGP Intercontinental Champion, defeating Kazuchika Okada in his first round match. The following day in New York City, MVP defeated Tetsuya Naito to advance to the finals of the tournament. On the third and final day of the tour in Philadelphia, Pennsylvania, MVP defeated Toru Yano in the finals to become the first IWGP Intercontinental Champion. Earlier in the event, MVP showed his allegiance to Satoshi Kojima by saving him from the debuting Lance Archer, thus breaking away from the newly renamed Suzuki-gun. On June 18 at Dominion 6.18, MVP made his first successful defense of the IWGP Intercontinental Championship by defeating Toru Yano. After the match, Yano attacked him and cut his hair. The two would face each other in a third title match on July 18, where MVP was once again victorious. After the match MVP was attacked and challenged by Yano's Chaos stablemate Masato Tanaka. In August, MVP took part in the 2011 G1 Climax, where he managed to win six out of his nine matches, but a loss to Karl Anderson on the final day of the tournament caused him to narrowly miss advancing to the finals. On October 10 at Destruction '11, MVP lost the IWGP Intercontinental Championship to Masato Tanaka, ending his reign at 148 days. MVP received a rematch for the title on December 4, but was again defeated by Tanaka, following interference from his stablemate Yujiro Takahashi.

On January 4, 2012, at Wrestle Kingdom VI in Tokyo Dome, MVP teamed with Shelton Benjamin, making a special one-time appearance, to defeat Tanaka and Takahashi in a tag team match. MVP reunited with Benjamin on June 16 at Dominion 6.16, where they defeated Karl Anderson and Tama Tonga in a tag team match. In August, MVP took part in his second G1 Climax tournament, where he won four out of his eight matches and failed to advance to the finals. In November, MVP took part in the 2012 World Tag League, where he teamed with Shelton Benjamin under the tag team name "Black Dynamite". MVP and Benjamin finished their tournament on December 1 with a record of three wins, one over the reigning IWGP Tag Team Champions K.E.S. (Davey Boy Smith Jr. and Lance Archer), and three losses, failing to advance from their block.

On January 4, 2013, at Wrestle Kingdom 7 in Tokyo Dome, MVP teamed with Akebono, Manabu Nakanishi and Strong Man in an eight-man tag team match, where they defeated Bob Sapp, Takashi Iizuka, Toru Yano and Yujiro Takahashi. On February 26, Assad announced that he had parted ways with New Japan and would be next focusing on a television project with Lionsgate Television. He later explained his reasons behind leaving the promotion, saying that he wanted to stay closer to his home in addition to just "recharging the batteries".

=== Total Nonstop Action Wrestling (2014–2015, 2019) ===
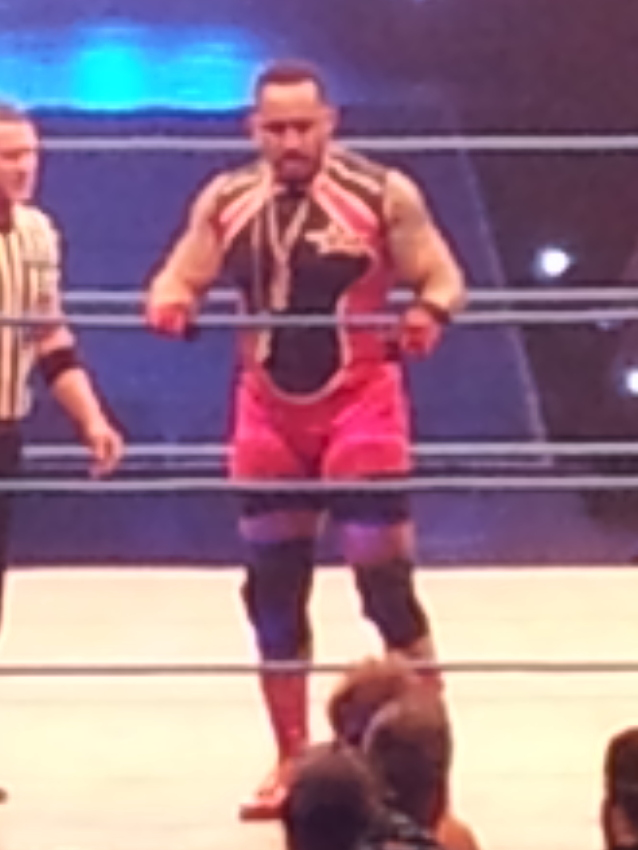
MVP in a TNA ring in January 2014

At the January 30, 2014, tapings of Impact Wrestling, Assad returned to TNA using the MVP name, where he was pointed as the storyline "investor" of TNA. As an authority figure, he signed The Wolves and counteracted TNA President Dixie Carter's agenda. They feuded for control of TNA until Lockdown, where two teams, representing MVP and Carter, faced each other. MVP's team defeated Dixie's team with an assist from special referee Bully Ray, earning MVP total control of wrestling operations.

MVP turned heel when, on the May 8 episode of Impact Wrestling, he attacked TNA World Heavyweight Champion Eric Young and announced himself as the number one contender to the title at Slammiversary XII. However, MVP suffered a legit torn meniscus and was removed from the match. According to PWInsider, the original plans were to crown MVP as champion. Imstead, MVP and Kenny King helped Lashley win the TNA World Heavyweight Championship from Eric Young, but MVP was replaced by Kurt Angle as the on-screen authority figure. From there, MVP acted as Lashley and King's manager (and occasional partner after his knee's condition improved), while feuding with Angle in promos. He defeated Kazma Sakamoto at Bound for Glory. On the November 5 episode of Impact Wrestling, MVP lost to Bobby Roode in a TNA World Heavyweight Championship match.

In January 2015, MVP formed a new group, the Beat Down Clan with King, Samoa Joe, Low Ki, and Eric Young, helping Lashley to regain the championship from Roode. MVP attempted to present Lashley as the centerpiece of the Clan as well as a "founding member" alongside King and himself. However, Lashley turned on them and the Beat Down Clan attacked him. At Impact Wrestling: Lockdown (2015), Team Angle (Kurt Angle, Austin Aries, Gunner, and Lashley) defeated The BDC (MVP, Samoa Joe, Low Ki, and Kenny King) in a Lethal Lockdown match. On February 27 broadcast of Impact Wrestling, MVP faced Lashley for the title, but was defeated. In April, The Beat Down Clan started a feud against the newly formed The Rising (Drew Galloway, Eli Drake and Micah), having several matches between the stables until the June 24, 2015 (aired July 1) episode of Impact Wrestling, where The Beat Down Clan defeated The Rising in a 4-on-3 Handicap match, forcing The Rising to dissolve. On July 17, 2015, MVP officially left TNA. He was reportedly released in the fallout of a contract dispute between TNA and Lucha Underground. MVP had pushed for TNA to sign Hernandez, even though he was at the time still under contract to Lucha Underground. When Lucha Underground contacted TNA, they released Hernandez and were forced to re-edit all segments he had been involved in at the past tapings.

On September 13, 2019, he made an appearance for TNA, now known as Impact Wrestling at their Operation Override Twitch special. In the match, he challenged for WCR's World Class Championship against the champion Chavo Guerrero Jr. Due to the disqualification finish, the two had a rematch at the following night's Victory Road Impact Plus Monthly Specials.

=== Independent circuit (2013–2019) ===
MVP has made frequent appearances for Tommy Dreamer's House of Hardcore (HOH) promotion. He wrestled at the second and third events when the promotion was starting up in 2013. After his stint in TNA, MVP defeated Moose at House of Hardcore XVI in August 2016 in his return to the promotion. He went on to appear at nine straight shows for the promotion in 2017, wrestling the likes of Jack Swagger, Tommy Dreamer, Billy Gunn and Matt Cross among others. At December 1, 2018, he made his most recent appearance for the promotion, defeating Big Cass at HOH 51.

He announced on March 31, 2016, that he would be joining Lucha Underground. However, days later, on April 8, he announced his release from the company due to inadvertently violating terms of his contract by interviewing members of the roster for his podcast. On October 10, 2016, MVP defeated Jody Kristofferson for the All Pro Wrestling (APW) Universal Heavyweight Championship. MVP fought Rob Van Dam for the PCW Ultra Heavyweight Championship on March 24, 2017, in a losing effort. The following day, MVP lost the APW Universal Heavyweight Championship to Luster the Legend. His June 22, 2018, return to APW resulted in a loss to Penta El 0M.

In early 2018 MVP wrestled two matches for Booker T's promotion Reality of Wrestling. On February 25, 2018, he won a battle royal for the Big League Wrestling World Heavyweight Championship, a title he still holds. In March 2018 he wrestled in Istanbul, Turkey for Turkish Power Wrestling in the main event. He debuted for AAW Wrestling on August 4, 2018, in a match where he beat Eddie Kingston.

During early 2019 he wrestled most frequently for World Class Revolution (WCR), a promotion based out of Oklahoma. Also during 2019 he wrestled for Oakland's Hoodslam Wrestling and Alberto El Patron's new Mexican promotion Nación Lucha Libre.

=== Major League Wrestling (2017–2018) ===
Due to his podcast on Court Bauer's MLW Radio Network, MVP was chosen as one of the wrestlers for the newly relaunched Major League Wrestling (MLW). He appeared at their first show since 2004, One Shot beating Sami Callihan in a no-disqualification match October 5, 2017. He also joined the company as an agent, producing talent promos and matches. In February 2018, MVP participated in the tournament to crown a new MLW World Heavyweight Champion, the first one since the promotion's revival. He was beaten in the first round by Tom Lawlor. Two months later he made his debut on their new weekly program MLW Fusion in a match against Callihan, that MVP lost. MVP continued his feud with Callihan by defeating one of Callihan's partners Leon Scott by DQ on the June 8 episode of MLW Fusion. On July 1, 2018, MVP revealed he had parted ways with MLW and MLW Radio. His final match for the promotion aired on July 6, 2018. It was a Boiler Room Brawl that was won by Sami Callihan ending their feud.

=== Ring of Honor (2019) ===
On January 25, 2019, MVP made a return to Ring of Honor (ROH) at their Road To G1 Supercard show in Houston, Texas. This was his first appearance for the company since one match in 2005, where he wrestled as Antonio Banks. At the show he debuted as a surprise partner of Kenny King, reforming the Beat Down Clan. They would go on to defeat the team of Willie Mack and Colt Cabana advancing them in the Tag Wars tournament. The winners of Tag Wars were set to receive a ROH World Tag Team Championship title shot at ROH's 17th-anniversary pay-per-view and a spot in the Crockett Cup tournament. However, MVP and King lost in the semi-finals of the tournament to Brody King and PCO.

=== Return to WWE (2018, 2020–2024) ===
==== Sporadic appearances and return (2018, 2020) ====
On January 22, 2018, MVP made a special appearance on the 25th-anniversary episode of Raw as a guest WWE legend, in a poker segment also involving The APA (Bradshaw and Ron Simmons), and Ted DiBiase. This marked his first WWE appearance of any kind in since December 2010, at that point.

When Paul Heyman worked as executive director of the Raw brand, Assad called him asking for a spot on the Royal Rumble match, since it was going to be held in Houston. Heyman agreed if he had also one match on Raw the next day. At the end, WWE and Assad made an agreement to work as a wrestler, manager, producer and commentator. On January 26, 2020, at the Royal Rumble pay-per-view, MVP would return again, as a face, as a surprise entrant at #12 in the Royal Rumble match, where he was quickly eliminated by Brock Lesnar; this marked MVP's first time in a WWE ring in 10 years. The next night on Raw, MVP had a match with Rey Mysterio, which he lost. On the February 10 episode of Raw, MVP brought back "The VIP Lounge," with his guest being 2020 Royal Rumble winner Drew McIntyre. During the segment, MVP turned heel for the first time since 2009, insulting the fans, and trying to advise McIntyre to be managed by him. However, McIntyre disregarded the advice and subsequently attacked MVP. The following week, MVP announced that he was hired by WWE as a backstage producer, while still being an on-screen performer. On the April 20 episode of Raw, MVP faced Apollo Crews to qualify for the Money in the Bank ladder match, but was defeated.

==== The Hurt Business (2020–2022) ====
At Money in the Bank on May 10, MVP was scheduled to face R-Truth, but was replaced by Bobby Lashley, who quickly defeated Truth. The following night on Raw, MVP aligned himself with Lashley. At Backlash, MVP managed Lashley as he challenged Drew McIntyre for the WWE Championship, but he was unsuccessful in capturing the title due to an altercation between MVP and Lashley's storyline wife, Lana, that distracted Lashley and allowed McIntyre to retain his championship. The following night on Raw, Lashley had a rematch against McIntyre for the WWE Championship in a tag team match that also involved MVP and R-Truth, but he lost again when the latter pinned MVP. On the July 20 episode of Raw, Shelton Benjamin joined his stable, now known as The Hurt Business.

MVP then started a feud with the United States Champion Apollo Crews, after MVP would offer him his services but Crews turned him down. During the storyline, MVP proclaimed himself the real United States Champion when he unveiled a new belt design. At The Horror Show at Extreme Rules, Crews did not appear for their scheduled match, so MVP declared himself as the champion. However, MVP faced Crews two times, one at Raw and the other at SummerSlam, failing both times. At Payback, Lashley defeated Crews to win the United States Championship. On the September 7 episode of Raw, Cedric Alexander joined The Hurt Business when he betrayed Crews and Ricochet during a six-man tag team match, attacking them and helping The Hurt Business win the match. At TLC, he was present when Alexander and Benjamin won the Raw Tag Team Championship. In early 2021, MVP suffered a leg injury and began using a crutch to move around, taken him out of in-ring action. He was present when Bobby Lashley won the WWE Championship on the March 1 episode of Raw.

On the March 29 episode of Raw, Lashley attacked Alexander and Benjamin due to them losing the Raw Tag Team Championships and losing to Drew McIntyre in a 2-on-1 handicap match, thus kicking the tag team out of the faction in the process. Lashley would proclaim that The Hurt Business was over. MVP later stated on Twitter that The Hurt Business is still in action, comprising now of just him and Lashley, and that it was open for new members.

On the July 5 episode of Raw, MVP wrestled for the first time since his injury earlier in the year, in a tag match with Bobby Lashley against Kofi Kingston and Xavier Woods, also known as The New Day. The team of MVP and Lashley lost the match. On the August 30 episode of Raw, MVP and Lashley would challenge RK-Bro for the Raw Tag Team Championships, but were unsuccessful in winning the titles. On the September 13 episode of Raw, MVP suffered a broken rib after receiving an RKO from Randy Orton, which put him out of action indefinitely. He returned on the November 8 episode of Raw, accompanying Lashley to the ring for his match with Dominik Mysterio.

==== Managing with Omos and departure (2022–2024) ====
On the April 4, 2022 episode of Raw, MVP turned on Lashley and aligned himself with Omos. MVP helped Omos defeat Lashley at WrestleMania Backlash. This led to a 2-on-1 handicap match at Hell in a Cell, where MVP and Omos lost to Lashley, ending their feud. He would accompany Omos to the ring throughout 2023 and 2024. His last appearance was accompanying Omos to the Andre the Giant Memorial Battle Royal on the SmackDown before WrestleMania XL. On August 16, 2024, MVP’s contract expired and his profile on WWE's website was moved to the alumni section officially ending his second tenure with the promotion.

Prior to MVP's departure from WWE during a June 2024 interview, it was revealed that The Hurt Business was planned to be reformed but after Vince McMahon retired in 2022, a new creative regime led by Paul "Triple H" Levesque was against the reformation of the group. MVP also accused WWE of stealing the stable's gimmick and giving it to The Bloodline.

=== Return to the independent circuit (2024–present) ===
On July 28, 2024, MVP debuted for Game Changer Wrestling (GCW) at Josh Barnett's Bloodsport XI, where he announced that he'd be leaving WWE and challenged Josh Barnett to a match. On November 24 at Josh Barnett's Bloodsport XII, MVP was defeated by Barnett via technical submission.

=== All Elite Wrestling (2024–present) ===
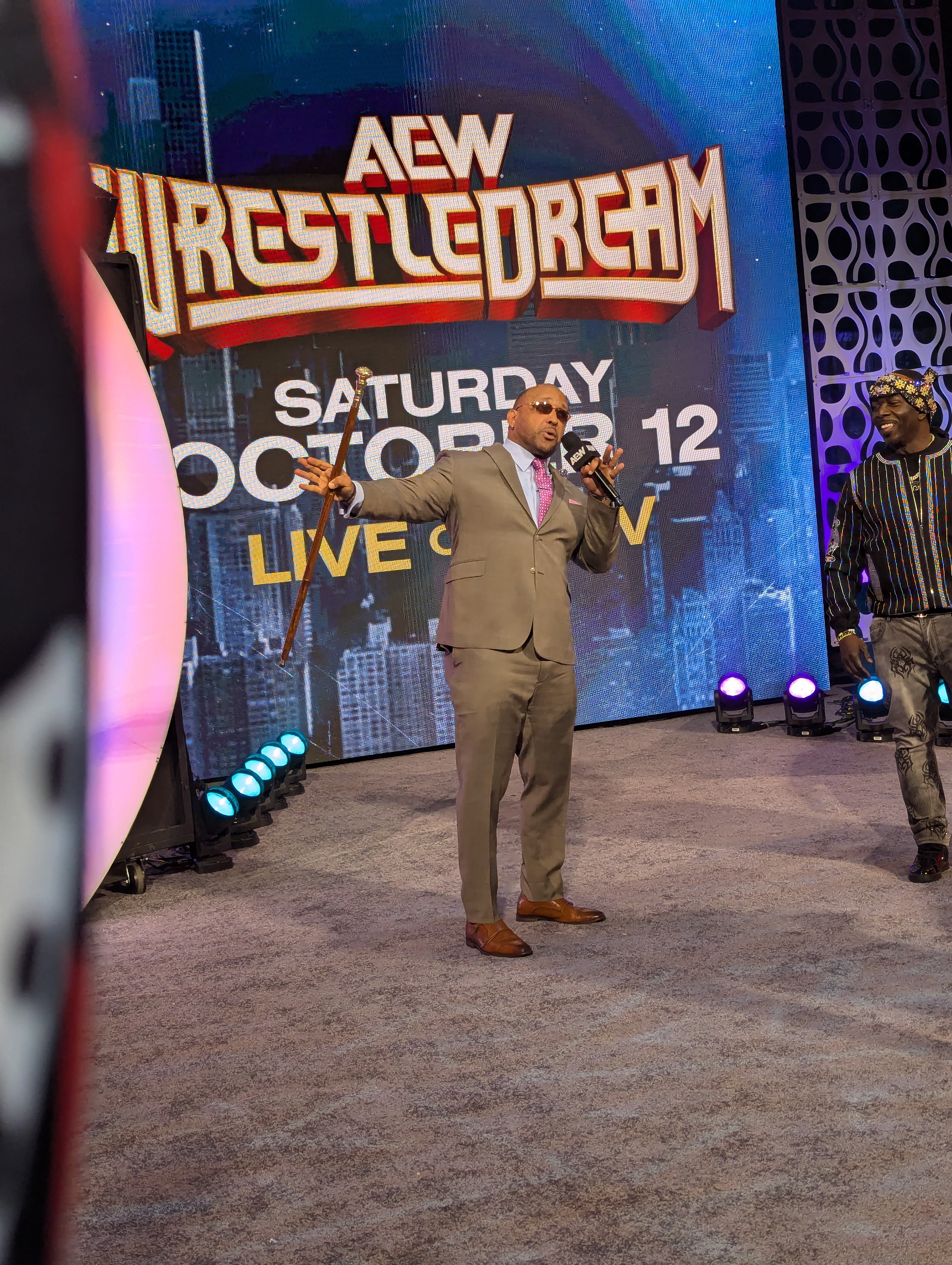
MVP making his debut for AEW at Grand Slam in September 2024

On September 25, 2024 at Grand Slam, MVP made his surprise debut for All Elite Wrestling (AEW), where he interrupted Prince Nana's interview about Swerve Strickland's condition and offered to take over for Nana as Strickland's manager, accusing Nana as the reason for Strickland's recent losses. The following week on AEW Dynamite's fifth anniversary episode, MVP introduced former Hurt Business member Shelton Benjamin as one of his business partners. MVP and Benjamin would go on to reform The Hurt Business under the new name "The Hurt Syndicate" and established themselves as heels. On October 12 at WrestleDream, MVP confronted Strickland, who responded by rejecting MVP's services and remained loyal to Prince Nana. On October 30 at Fright Night Dynamite, MVP and Benjamin reunited with Bobby Lashley, as the trio beat down Strickland and Nana to close the show.

On January 15, 2025 at Maximum Carnage, MVP made his AEW in-ring debut, teaming with Benjamin and Lashley to defeat Mark Briscoe and Private Party (Isiah Kassidy and Marq Quen). On the March 12 episode of Dynamite, MVP confronted MJF and offered him a spot in The Hurt Syndicate. On the March 26 episode of Dynamite, MJF initially accepted the offer, but would be turned away by Benjamin and Lashley. On May 14 at Dynamite: Beach Break, Lashley, Benjamin, and MVP accepted MJF as a member of the group. On the July 23 episode of Dynamite, The Hurt Syndicate (minus MJF) would turn into tweeners as they would be briefly hired by Cope to assist him in his feud with FTR (Cash Wheeler and Dax Harwood). After weeks of tension, The Hurt Syndicate kicked MJF out of the group due to his selfish attitude on the August 6 episode of Dynamite. In September 2025, The Hurt Syndicate then began a feud with The Demand (Ricochet, Bishop Kaun, and Toa Liona), losing to them at All Out on September 20 in a regular trios match, but defeated them in a rematch at Dynamite: Title Tuesday on October 7 in a Street Fight and on October 12 at WrestleDream in a tornado trios match to become the number one contenders for the AEW World Trios Championship, but failed to defeat The Opps (Samoa Joe, Powerhouse Hobbs, and Katsuyori Shibata) for the titles after Ricochet interfered.

== Brazilian jiu-jitsu career ==
Assad practices Brazilian jiu-jitsu and competes under his real name, in which he gained the rank of purple belt after winning the gold medal at the Houston Open in the Masters 3 Ultra Heavyweight Division. He also won gold in the Open Division at the Houston Open, and silver at the IBJJF Masters World Championship in the Masters 4/Male/Purple/Ultra-Heavy Category. In December 2020, he won a gold medal at the IBJJF masters world championship in the Masters 4/Male/Purple/Ultra-Heavy Category, and was promoted to brown belt at the medal presentation. He continues to train in the sport with former professional wrestler-turned Hollywood actor Dave Bautista. In April 2024, he was awarded his black belt in Brazilian Jiu-jitsu by Andre Santos at Gracie Barra Boca Raton.

== Personal life ==
In August 2007, Assad was diagnosed with Wolff–Parkinson–White syndrome, a rare condition that causes the heart to beat faster than normal. The condition was found in his time with WWE, when he had undergone a routine check-up in accordance with WWE's Talent Wellness Policy, which otherwise would have gone undetected until it was too late.

Assad has acquired many tattoos through his life, including a portrait of Malcolm X on the upper left portion of his chest, the sarcophagus of King Tut & the pyramids on his left upper biceps, the word MonteCristo with the phrase "the best revenge is living well" in script on his right forearm, both references to the book The Count of Monte Cristo, the Eye of Horus on the back of his left arm, and a star on his right shoulder. He also has a number of homemade gang-related tattoos that he had done when he was a teenager.

Assad enjoys playing video games and took inspiration for the finishing move he used on the independent circuit, a spin kick called Malicious Intent, from a similar move performed by Tekken character Eddy Gordo. He has been a fan of English football team Manchester United FC since age 13, citing Eric Cantona as his favorite player.

Due to Assad's criminal record, his visits to other countries on wrestling tours are subject to permits and background checks for recent behavior. Assad converted to Islam during his time in prison, but is now an atheist, and because of that, he was unable to attend WWE's shows in Saudi Arabia, where his status as a Muslim-turned-atheist is considered punishable by death.

== Other media ==
Assad made a cameo appearance in the film MacGruber, alongside fellow WWE Superstars Chris Jericho, The Great Khali, Big Show, Kane, and Mark Henry.

Assad, under the MVP name, released his first hip hop song titled "Holla to da World" featuring Dwayne Swayze in June 2011. A music video for the song, featuring cameos from Carlito and Hernandez, was released the following October. The song was released as a single through iTunes on April 5, 2012. On March 18, 2013, he released his second song entitled "Tokyo". On January 30, 2014, MVP released his third single, titled "Return of the Ronin". The song also became MVP's entrance theme in TNA.

MVP has been featured as a playable character in the video games WWE SmackDown vs. Raw 2008, WWE SmackDown vs. Raw 2009, WWE SmackDown vs. Raw 2010, WWE SmackDown vs. Raw 2011, and WWE 2K22, his first WWE licensed video game in 11 years. He also appeared in WWE 2K23 and WWE 2K24.

=== Filmography ===
| Year | Title | Role |
|---|---|---|
| 2010 | MacGruber | Vernon Freedom |

== Championships and accomplishments ==
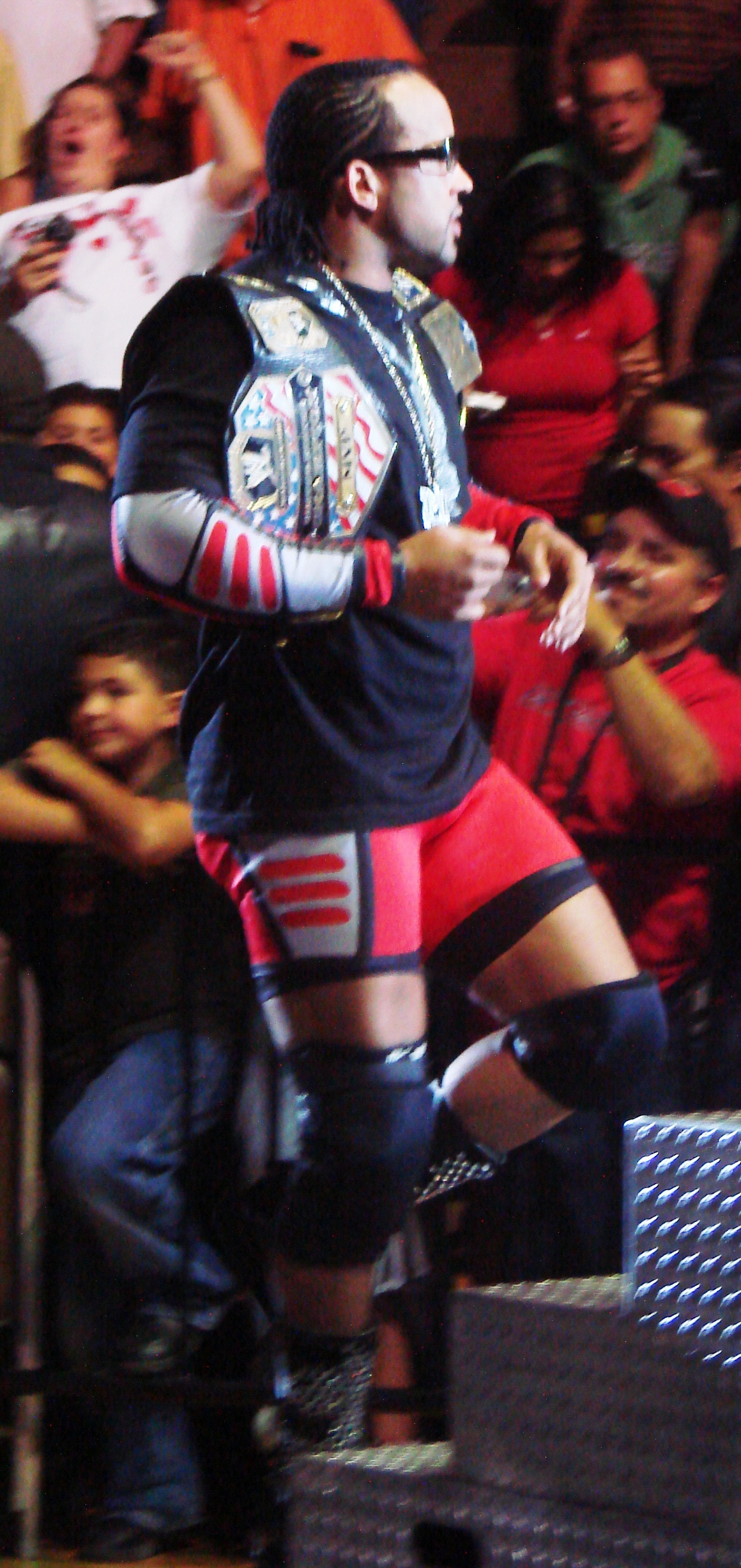
MVP as both the United States Champion (right shoulder) and one half of the WWE Tag Team Champion (left shoulder) in 2007

- All Pro Wrestling
  - APW Universal Heavyweight Championship (1 time)
- The Baltimore Sun
  - Most Improved Wrestler of the Year (2007)
- Big League Wrestling
  - BLW World Heavyweight Championship (1 time)
  - BLW Title Rumble Match (2018)
- CBS Sports
  - Comeback Wrestler of the Year (2020)
- Coastal Championship Wrestling
  - CCW World Heavyweight Championship (1 time)
- DDT Pro-Wrestling
  - Ironman Heavymetalweight Championship (1 time)
- Future of Wrestling
  - FOW Tag Team Championship (1 time) – with Punisher
- Imperial Wrestling Revolution
  - IWR Heavyweight Championship (1 time)
  - IWR Tag Team Championship (1 time) – with D Money, Marce Lewis, Montego Seeka and Nytronis A'Teo
- New Japan Pro-Wrestling
  - IWGP Intercontinental Championship (1 time, inaugural)
  - IWGP Intercontinental Championship Tournament (2011)
- Pro Wrestling Illustrated
  - Comeback of the Year (2020)
  - Ranked No. 23 of the best 500 singles wrestlers in the PWI 500 in 2008
- Southern Championship Wrestling Florida
  - SCW Florida Heavyweight Championship (1 time)
- World Class Revolution
  - WCR Heavyweight Championship (3 times)
- World Wrestling Entertainment/WWE
  - WWE United States Championship (2 times)
  - WWE Tag Team Championship (1 time) – with Matt Hardy
  - Slammy Award (1 time)
    - Trash Talker of the Year (2020) as The Hurt Business, shared with Lacey Evans
- Wrestling Observer Newsletter
  - Most Improved (2007)
  - Most Underrated (2008)
