= One Shot (2023) =

2023 Major League Wrestling event

- Promotional poster of the event
- Promotion: Major League Wrestling
- Date: December 7, 2023
- City: Queens, New York
- Venue: Melrose Ballroom
- Attendance: 1,000

Event chronology
← Previous; Fightland	Next → Kings of Colosseum

One Shot chronology
← Previous; 2017	Next → —

One Shot (2023) was a professional wrestling event produced by Major League Wrestling (MLW). It took place on December 7, 2023, at the Melrose Ballroom in Queens, New York, and streamed live on FITE. It was the second event under the One Shot chronology, and first since 2017.

Additional matches were taped for MLW's "Holiday Rush", a free special which aired on BeIN Sports USA and MLW's YouTube channel on December 23.

== Production ==
=== Background ===
Other on-screen personnel
Role:	Name:
Commentators	Joe Dombrowski
Commentators	Matt Striker
Commentators	Saint Laurent

First held on October 5, 2017, MLW One Shot was the inaugural event of MLW's 2017 relaunch as a professional wrestling promotion. On May 2, 2023, a new partnership between MLW and FITE was announced, in-which the promotion would produce live events for FITE+ subscribers. MLW would subsequently announce four upcoming FITE+ specials on July 8, 2023, with One Shot announced to be taking place on December 7, at the Melrose Ballroom in Queens, New York.

=== Storylines ===
The card will consist of matches that result from scripted storylines, where wrestlers portray villains, heroes, or less distinguishable characters in scripted events that built tension and culminate in a wrestling match or series of matches, with results predetermined by MLW's writers. Storylines are played out on MLW's television program, Fusion, and the league's social media platforms.

As part of MLW's Open Door Policy, several free agents and freelancers would appear at the event. Announced names include the debut of Tokyo Joshi Pro-Wrestling (TJPW) Princess of Princess Champion Miyu Yamashita and the return of former MLW World Heavyweight Champion Satoshi Kojima

After Alex Kane defended the MLW World Heavyweight Championship at Slaughterhouse, he was confronted by Matt Cardona and his promoter Mister Saint Laurent of the World Titan Federation. Cardona claimed that as the show was being held in the 2300 Arena (the home venue of Extreme Championship Wrestling (ECW) for years), and that he was the "Deathmatch King", he should be world champion. On the October 26 episode of Fusion, executive producer for the night Salina de la Renta granted MSL the duty of producing One Shot, with the bonus that one of his WTF clients will have a world title match with Kane at the event. On November 2, MLW announced on social media that Cardona would challenge Kane for the title at the event.

== Results ==
One-Shot
No.	Results	Stipulations	Times
1	Rocky Romero (c) (with Salina de la Renta) defeated Máscara Dorada by pinfall	Singles match for both the MLW World Middleweight Championship and the NWA World Historic Welterweight Championship	10:45
2	Miyu Yamashita (c) defeated Delmi Exo by pinfall	Singles match for the Princess of Princess Championship	9:13
3	Satoshi Kojima defeated Tom Lawlor (with Mister Saint Laurent) by pinfall	Singles match	13:30
4	Rickey Shane Page (c) defeated Jimmy Lloyd by pinfall	Singles match for the MLW National Openweight Championship	5:24
5	Janai Kai (c) (with Salina de la Renta) defeated Maki Itoh by submission	Singles match for the MLW World Women's Featherweight Championship	7:27
6	Alex Kane (c) (with Mr. Thomas) defeated Matt Cardona (with Steph De Lander) by submission	Singles match for the MLW World Heavyweight Championship	14:36
(c) / – the champion(s) heading into the match

Holiday Rush (December 23)
No.	Results	Stipulations	Times
1^{D}	Cannonball defeated Dr. Dax	Singles match	2:02
2	Akira defeated Alec Price, Love, Doug, Nolo Kitano, J Boujii, and Brett Ryan Gosselin by pinfall	Six-way Scramble	7:42
3	Zayda Steel (with Mister Saint Laurent) defeated Tiara James and Notorious Mimi by pinfall	Three-way match	3:50
4	Josh Bishop (with Mister Saint Laurent) defeated Matthew Justice by pinfall	Singles match	6:03
5	Tony Deppen (with The Dirty Ass Bastards (TJ Crawford and Griffin McCoy)) defeated Kevin Blackwood by pinfall	Singles match	1:53
6	Wasted Youth (Dlyn McKay and Marcus Mathers) defeated The Mane Event (Midas Black and Jay Lyon), and The Dirty Ass Bastards (TJ Crawford and Griffin McCoy) by pinfall	Three-way tag team match to determine the #1 contenders to the MLW World Tag Team Championship	4:12
7	Ichiban defeated Salina de la Renta (with Promociones Dorado (Janai Kai, Jesús Rodriguez, and Rocky Romero)) by disqualification	Intergender match Since Ichiban won, he got a future opportunity at Romero's MLW World Middleweight Championship.	1:02
8	The Bomaye Fight Club (Alex Kane and Mr. Thomas) defeated The Second Gear Crew (1 Called Manders and Good Brother #3) (c) by disqualification	Tag team match for the MLW World Tag Team Championship	7:30
9	Jacob Fatu defeated Alexander Hammerstone (with Mister Saint Laurent) by pinfall	Singles match	16:28
(c) / – the champion(s) heading into the match; D / – this was a dark match
