= Slaughterhouse (2023) =

2023 Major League Wrestling event

- Promotional poster of the event
- Promotion: Major League Wrestling
- Date: October 14, 2023
- City: Philadelphia, Pennsylvania
- Venue: 2300 Arena

Event chronology
← Previous; Fury Road	Next → Fightland

Slaughterhouse chronology
← Previous; First	Next → 2024

Slaughterhouse (2023) was a professional wrestling event produced by Major League Wrestling (MLW). It was the first annual Slaughterhouse and took place on October 14, 2023, at the 2300 Arena in Philadelphia, Pennsylvania. It was MLW's third live special produced for FITE, with additional matches being taped for future episodes of MLW Fusion.

The event also featured the MLW return of Tom Lawlor after a two-year sabbatical, who then later announced that he had signed with MLW.

== Production ==
=== Background ===
Other on-screen personnel
Role:	Name:
Commentators	Joe Dombrowski
Commentators	Matt Striker

On May 2, 2023, a new partnership between MLW and FITE was announced, in-which the promotion would produce live events for FITE+ subscribers. MLW would subsequently announce four upcoming FITE+ specials on July 8, 2023, with Slaughterhouse announced to be taking place on October 14, at the 2300 Arena in Philadelphia, Pennsylvania.

=== Storylines ===
The card consisted of matches that result from scripted storylines, where wrestlers portrayed villains, heroes, or less distinguishable characters in scripted events that built tension and culminate in a wrestling match or series of matches, with results predetermined by MLW's writers. Storylines were played out on MLW Fusion, and the league's social media platforms.

As part of MLW's "Open Door Policy", several outside talents will appear at the event. Names include Japanese legend Minoru Suzuki.

At Fury Road, Salina de la Renta returned to MLW as the first guest of "Sessions by Saint Laurent," resurrecting her Promociones Dorado stable. During her appearance, she teased the prospect of a new client, which she promised to reveal at Slaughterhouse. On October 3, MLW announced that de la Renta will also accompany NWA World Historic Welterweight Champion Rocky Romero in a Winner Takes All match against MLW World Middleweight Champion Akira.

For the past year, Alex Kane and Davey Boy Smith Jr. had been involved in a feud, stemming from Kane being revealed as the man who stole the Opera Cup trophy from Davey Richards. On the August 16 episode of Fusion, a newly heel Smith would defeat Tracy Williams to win the 2023 Opera Cup tournament, which would grant him a title opportunity of his choosing. Several weeks later on the September 14 episode, MLW World Heavyweight Champion Kane was holding a press conference when Smith's promoter, Mister Saint Laurent, challenged Kane to a title match at Slaughterhouse on behalf of Smith. The following week, Bomaye Fight Club backer Don King announced that Kane accepted the challenge. However, on October 12, MLW announced that Boy Smith Jr. is injured and has been repleaced by Tom Lawlor.

For several weeks on Fusion, B3cca has repeatedly targeted MLW World Women's Featherweight Champion Delmi Exo in an attempt to gain a title opportunity, which included hitting the champion with a guitar. At Fury Road, B3cca got that opportunity after defeating Maki Itoh in a number one contender's match. On September 26, MLW announced that Exo will defend the featherweight championship against B3cca at Slaughterhouse. However, on October 1, MLW announced on their website that B3cca had to withdraw from the match due to other commitments. A "phantom challenger" would be set to replace her at Slaughterhouse.

In the ongoing rivalry between The Calling and The Second Gear Crew (SGC), on the September 22 episode of Fusion, Mance Warner of the latter group called out The Calling for a Chamber of Horrors match. Later in the night, MLW World Middleweight Champion Akira and Matthew Justice faced off, but it ended in a no contest. Following the bout, Akira's Calling stablemates Cannonball and MLW National Openweight Champion Rickey Shane Page came out and attacked Justice. Warner and 1 Called Manders of the SGC tried to intervene, but were put down by The Calling, with Page putting Warner through a table. A few days later on September 27, MLW announced that the Chamber of Horrors match will happen between The SGC (Warner and Justice) and The Calling (Cannonball and Talon) at Slaughterhouse. Additionally, on the September 28 episode of Fusion, it was announced that Page will defend the National Openweight Championship against Manders in a Spin the Wheel, Make the Deal match.

== Results ==
No.	Results	Stipulations	Times
1^{FT}	The Bomaye Fight Club (O'Shay Edwards and Mr. Thomas) defeated The Mane Event (Midas Black and Jay Lyon)	Tag team match	3:42
2^{FT}	TJ Crawford defeated Nolo Kitano	Singles match	5:17
3^{FT}	Tiara James defeated Notorious Mimi	Singles match	3:18
4^{FT}	Griffin McCoy defeated Tracy Williams	Singles match	8:35
5^{FT}	Ichiban defeated Love, Doug	Singles match	6:08
6^{FT}	Janai Kai (with Salina de la Renta) defeated Riley Krowe	Singles match	0:14
7^{FT}	Mance Warner defeated Talon	Singles match	1:33
8^{FT}	Brett Ryan Gosselin defeated J Boujii (with O'Shay Edwards)	Singles match	6:16
9^{FT}	Ichiban defeated Jesús Rodriguez (with Salina de la Renta)	Singles match	4:28
10^{FT}	World Titan Federation (Tom Lawlor and Matt Cardona) (with Mister Saint Laurent) defeated The Bomaye Fight Club (Mr. Thomas and Alex Kane)	Tag team match	9:08
11^{FT}	The Calling (Rickey Shane Page and Akira) (c) vs. The Second Gear Crew (Matthew Justice and 1 Called Manders) ended in a draw	Tables match for the MLW World Tag Team Championship	8:21
12	The Second Gear Crew (Mance Warner and Matthew Justice) defeated The Calling (Cannonball and Talon)	Chamber of Horrors match	8:46
13	Rocky Romero (NWA) (with Salina de la Renta) defeated Akira (MLW) by pinfall	Winner Takes All match for the MLW World Middleweight Championship and the NWA World Historic Welterweight Championship	16:14
14	Rickey Shane Page (c) defeated 1 Called Manders by pinfall	Spin the Wheel, Make the Deal: Falls Count Anywhere match for the MLW National Openweight Championship (Note: Page and Manders brawled around the arena, with the next two matches starting and ending before Page and Manders returned to the ring to finish their match.)	46:37
15	Janai Kai (with Salina de la Renta) defeated Delmi Exo (c) by submission	Singles match for the MLW World Women's Featherweight Championship	8:52
16	Minoru Suzuki defeated Jacob Fatu by pinfall	Singles match	11:01
17	Alex Kane (c) (with Mr. Thomas) defeated Tom Lawlor (with Mister Saint Laurent) by pinfall	Singles match for the MLW World Heavyweight Championship	17:28
(c) / – the champion(s) heading into the match; FT / – the match was taped for a future broadcast of Fusion
