= MLW One Shot =

- Promotions: Major League Wrestling
- First event: One Shot (2017)

MLW One Shot is a professional wrestling supercard event produced by Major League Wrestling (MLW). The event was first held in 2017.

== History ==
MLW One Shot took place on October 5, 2017, and it marked the return of MLW as a wrestling promotion following their 2004 closure.

On May 2, 2023, a new partnership between MLW and FITE was announced, in which live specials would be produced for FITE+. MLW would subsequently announce four upcoming FITE+ specials on July 8, 2023, with One Shot announced to be taking place on December 7, at the Melrose Ballroom in Queens, New York.

== Dates and venues ==
#	Event	Date	City	Venue	Main Event	Notes	Ref
1	One Shot (2017)	October 5, 2017	Orlando, Florida	Gilt Nightclub	Shane Strickland vs. Ricochet		
2	One Shot (2023)	December 7, 2023	Queens, New York	Melrose Ballroom	Alex Kane (c) vs. Matt Cardona for the MLW World Heavyweight Championship		
3	One Shot (2024)	December 5, 2024	Queens, New York	Melrose Ballroom	Contra Unit (Minoru Suzuki and Ikuro Kwon) (c) vs. CozyMax (Satoshi Kojima and Okumura) for the MLW World Tag Team Championship		
