= MLW Slaughterhouse =

Slaughterhouse
- Promotions: Major League Wrestling
- First event: Slaughterhouse (2023)

MLW Slaughterhouse is a professional wrestling event produced by Major League Wrestling (MLW). It is a Halloween-themed show that is usually held in October.

== History ==
The event's name originated from a 2019 special episode of the promotion's television series, MLW Fusion, called "Jimmy Havoc's Slaughterhouse". The episode, which was taped during The Crash/Major League Wrestling show on October 5, 2019, would air on October 19 on Bein Sports USA.

The first standalone event under the "Slaughterhouse" name took place on October 14, 2023, and was streamed live on FITE (now TrillerTV) as part of a partnership to produce live events for its FITE+ subscription service.

On July 10, 2024, MLW announced that a second event would take place on October 4, 2024, at The Coliseum in St. Petersburg, Florida, and would stream live on MLW's YouTube channel. However, the event was cancelled due to Hurricane Helene. The event's name would be repurposed as a TV special, with matches being taped at Lucha Apocalypto on November 9, 2024.

== Dates and venues ==
#	Event	Date	City	Venue	Main Event	Ref
1	Slaughterhouse (2023)	October 14, 2023	Philadelphia, Pennsylvania	2300 Arena	Alex Kane (c) vs. Tom Lawlor for the MLW World Heavyweight Championship	
2	Slaughterhouse (2024)	November 9, 2024 (aired on November 23, 2024)	Cicero, Illinois	Cicero Stadium	Mads Krule Krügger vs. Akira in a Weaspons of Mass Destrucion match	
3	Slaughterhouse (2025)	October 4, 2025	Long Beach, California	Thunder Studios Arena	Austin Aries vs. Mistico in a 2025 Opera Cup semifinal match	
4	Slaughterhouse (2026)	October 3, 2026	Atlanta, Georgia	Center Stage	Killer Kross (c) vs. Místico for the MLW World Heavyweight Championship	
