= Chicago Red Hots =

Roller derby team

- Short name: Red Hots
- Affiliation(s): USA Roller Sports
- Founded: December 11, 2012
- Folded: 2018
- Based in: Cicero, Illinois, United States
- Stadium: Cicero Stadium
- Colors: Red, White
- Head coach: Dakota Prosch
- Manager: Fernando Regueiro
- Website: www.redhotsderby.com

The Chicago Red Hots was an amateur roller derby team based in Cicero, Illinois, United States. The club was affiliated with USA Roller Sports under the US Olympic Committee. It was founded on December 11, 2012, by Dakota Prosch (formerly known as Kola Loka), Danielle Henderson (formerly known as Dani GYG) and Fernando Regueiro. The team disbanded after the 2018 season.
