= One Shot (2017) =

2017 Major League Wrestling event

- Promotional poster featuring several MLW wrestlers
- Promotion: Major League Wrestling
- Date: October 5, 2017
- City: Orlando, Florida
- Venue: Gilt Nightclub
- Attendance: 200

Event chronology
← Previous; Reloaded	Next → Never Say Never

One Shot chronology
← Previous —	Next → 2023

One Shot (2017) was a professional wrestling supercard event produced by Major League Wrestling (MLW), which took place on October 5, 2017, at the Gilt Nightclub in Orlando, Florida. This was the first event under the One Shot chronology and MLW's first event since 2004.

Nine professional wrestling matches were contested at the event. In the main event, Shane Strickland defeated Ricochet. In other prominent matches on the card, MVP defeated Sami Callihan and Tom Lawlor defeated Jeff Cobb.

The event drew a crowd of 200 people and was well received by critics and audiences.

== Production ==
=== Background ===
Major League Wrestling operated as a professional wrestling promotion between 2002 and 2004. In February 2004, just a month after holding its Reloaded event, MLW owner Court Bauer closed the promotion due to financial problems. On July 10, 2017, thirteen years after the closure of MLW, Sports Illustrated broke the news that MLW would be returning to produce a one-off event called "One Shot" on October 5 at the Gilt Nightclub in Orlando, Florida. MLW.com confirmed the news on the same day.

On August 7, MLW launched a new over-the-top service MLW.tv and it was announced that One Shot would be streamed on the platform to be accessible for audiences worldwide. It was also confirmed that longtime hockey commentator Rich Bocchini, as well as former World Championship Wrestling play-by-play announcer Tony Schiavone, would provide commentary for One Shot; marking the first professional wrestling card Schiavone has called since WCW's closure in 2001.

On October 2, Totino's became the official sponsor for One Shot.

=== Storylines ===
The card consisted of matches that resulted from scripted storylines, where wrestlers portrayed villains, heroes, or less distinguishable characters in scripted events that built tension and culminated in a wrestling match or series of matches, with results predetermined by MLW's writers.

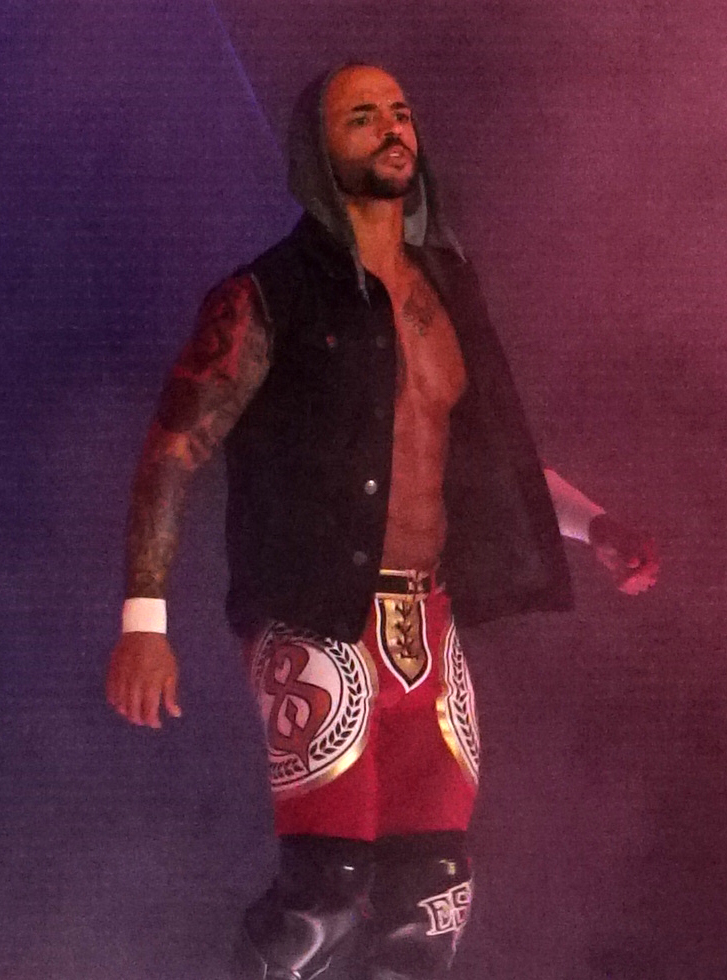
Ricochet was the first wrestler exclusively signed for One Shot and competed against Shane Strickland in the main event.

On July 21, 2017, MLW announced that Ricochet would be the first wrestler signed to compete at One Shot. On July 24, MLW announced that his opponent would be Shane Strickland and the two would compete in the main event of One Shot, thus it also being the first match to be announced for the event.

On July 31, MLW announced that Sami Callihan would be making his MLW debut at One Shot. On August 13, Miami Herald broke the news that former WWE and New Japan Pro-Wrestling star Montel Vontavious Porter would make his MLW debut as Callihan's opponent at One Shot.

On August 17, Sporting News reported that Jeff Cobb would be making his MLW debut at One Shot. On August 28, Cageside Seats reported that Ultimate Fighting Championship (UFC) mixed martial artist Tom Lawlor would make his return to professional wrestling and make his MLW debut as Cobb's opponent at the event.

On September 5, MLW.com announced that Maxwell Jacob Friedman would compete at One Shot, with Jimmy Yuta named as his opponent on September 21.

On September 7, MLW owner Court Bauer revealed on the Steve Austin Show Unleashed podcast hosted by Stone Cold Steve Austin, that Santana Garrett would be competing on One Shot. Mia Yim was named her opponent on September 21, thus setting up the only women's match at the event.

On September 12, MLW.com announced that Jason Cade would be competing at One Shot. Darby Allin was named his opponent on September 25.

On September 19, MLW.com announced that Barrington Hughes would compete at One Shot, billing him as the first super heavyweight to compete in MLW. On September 22, Martin Stone was also announced to be competing at the event.

The final three names to compete at One Shot were announced to be Mike Parrow, Rhett Giddins and Seth Petruzelli. A tag team match was set up for One Shot pitting Giddins and Petruzelli against Parrow and Saieve Al Sabah.

== Event ==
=== Preliminary matches ===
The event opened with a match between Tama Tonga and Martin Stone. Tonga executed a Gun Stun for the win.

Next, Rhett Giddins and Seth Petruzelli took on Parrow and Saieve Al Sabah in a tag team match. Petruzelli made Al Sabah submit to a cross armbreaker for the win. After the match, Parrow powerbombed Sabah.

Next, Jimmy Yuta took on Maxwell Jacob Friedman. Near the end of the match, MJF faked a jaw injury and distracted the referee as he kicked Yuta in the groin and pinned him with a roll-up for the win.

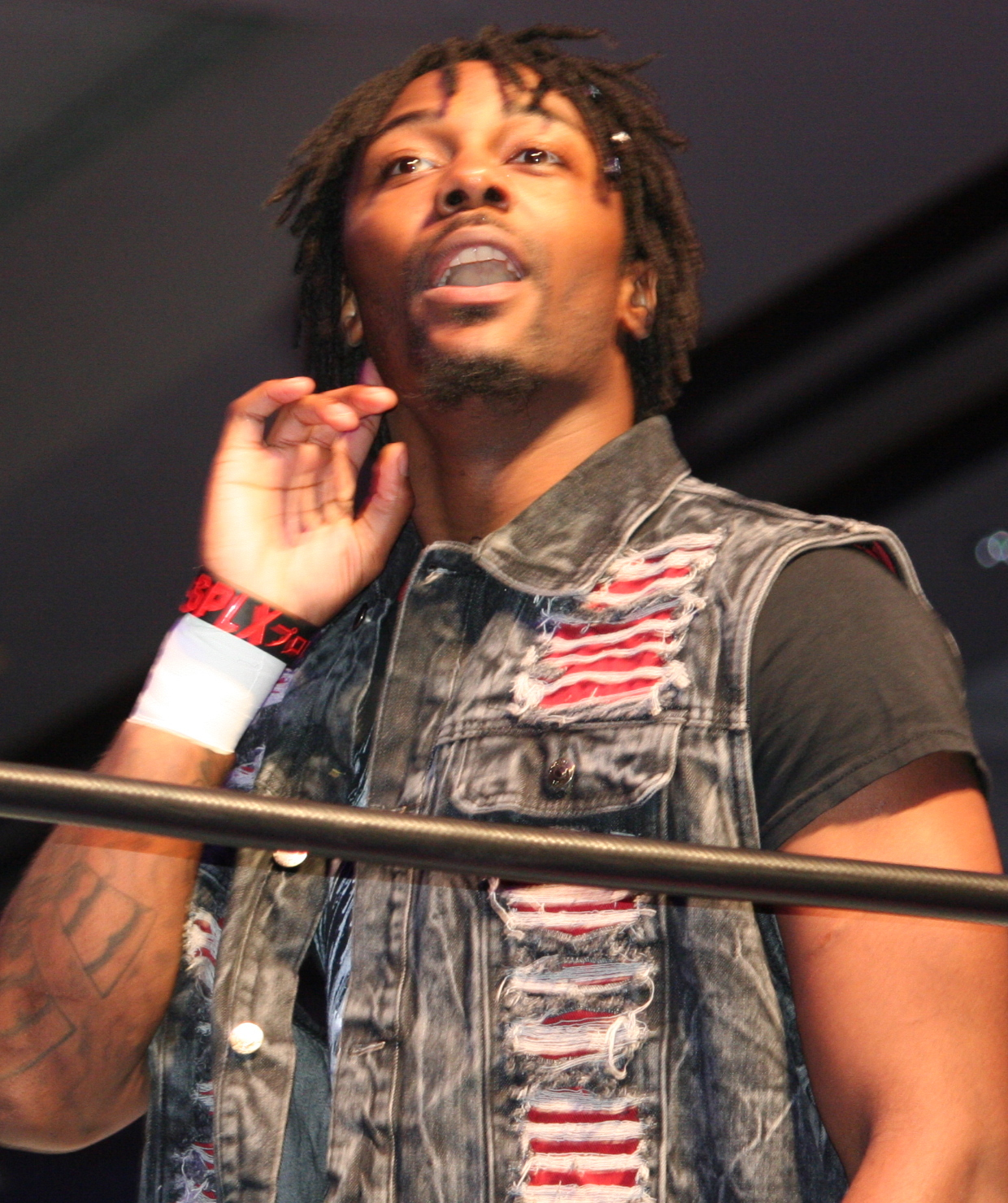
Shane Strickland defeated Ricochet in the main event of One Shot.

Next, Barrington Hughes took on Markos Espada. Hughes immediately executed a Purple Crush on Espada and pinned him for the quick win.

In the following match, Darby Allin took on Jason Cade. Allin raised his knees up to block a frog splash by Cade and then applied a figure four leglock on Cade and pinned him for the win.

Next, the only women's match took place at the event pitting Santana Garrett against Mia Yim. Garrett nailed a Shining Star Press to Yim for the win.

Later, Tom Lawlor took on Jeff Cobb. After a back and forth match, Lawlor raked Cobb in the eyes and then pinned him with a sunset flip for the win. Lawlor was interviewed after the match, during which he insulted the crowd for not cheering for him and challenged fellow mixed martial artist Matt Riddle to a match for MLW's next event Never Say Never.

The penultimate match of the event saw MVP take on Sami Callihan. After a back and forth match, MVP nailed a fisherman suplex to Callihan for the win.

=== Main event match ===
The main event pitted Shane Strickland against Ricochet. Strickland blocked a kick by Ricochet and applied a cross armbreaker to force him to submit to the hold.

== Reception ==
Jason Powell of Pro Wrestling Dot Net considered One Shot to be "a fun show". According to him "the first half of the night felt missable for the most part, but that half of the show was brief and they did introduce some personalities who may play bigger roles going forward." He praised the main event match considering it "a strong close to the show". He praised the Tonga-Stone match, considering it to be "a nice opening match" and considered the MVP-Callihan to be "A fun hardcore brawl. It stood out nicely on a show filled with mostly straight forward wrestling and was well received by the live crowd." He also appreciated MJF-Yuta, Allin-Cade and the women's match while criticizing the Barrington Hughes match as well as Lawlor-Cobb match.

Larry Csonka of 411Mania rated the event 5.5 as he stated "MLW did a great job with the production of the show. The video quality was excellent, it was largely well shot and the promos (especially for Strickland vs. Ricochet) were tremendous." He further wrote "The first portion of the show wasn’t very good at all, and it certainly picked up and has a great main event, but as an overall show, it wasn’t very good."

Sean Radican of Pro Wrestling Torch rated the event 7.0 as he stated "there wasn’t much thrilling on the undercard, but it closed with a great main event between Shane Strickland and Ricochet". According to him "Mia Yim vs. Santana Garrett was very good on the undercard, as was (Tom) Lawler vs. (Jeff) Cobb. They did a good job of giving Lawler a big win over Cobb. Lawler did a good job playing the heel, but he needs to do more to get the crowd against him on the mic." He gave praise to the final two matches on the card by writing "The show ended on a high note with two really good matches. The crowd wasn’t super hot all night, but they were good for Sami Callihan vs. MVP and Shane Strickland vs. Ricochet. Strickland vs. Ricochet is worth going out of your way to see. They had a very mature match. They paced it well and told a good story with Strickland working over Ricochet’s arm throughout the match before submitting him in the end."

== Aftermath ==
One Shot was originally intended to be a one-off event but the success of the event led MLW to make its full-time return as a regular touring promotion as it announced its next supercard called Never Say Never for December 7.

Matt Riddle responded to Tom Lawlor's challenge for a match via Twitter and signed a contract with MLW, thus accepting Lawlor's challenge for a match at Never Say Never.

Parrow's attack on Saieve Al Sabah after losing their tag team match at One Shot would lead to a match between the two at Never Say Never.

Shane Strickland and Sami Callihan were mysteriously attacked by two assailants outside Gilt Nightclub after One Shot. On October 27, an exclusive video was posted on MLW.com in which Darby Allin was revealed as one of the attackers. Jimmy Havoc was later revealed to be the second attacker. The duo of Havoc and Allin challenged Strickland to a hardcore tag team match at Never Say Never, which Strickland accepted and chose John Hennigan as his partner.

== Results ==
No.	Results	Stipulations	Times
1	Tama Tonga defeated Martin Stone	Singles match	6:50
2	Rhett Giddins and Seth Petruzelli defeated Parrow and Saieve Al Sabah	Tag team match	5:36
3	Maxwell Jacob Friedman defeated Jimmy Yuta	Singles match	6:40
4	Barrington Hughes defeated Markos Espada	Singles match	0:10
5	Darby Allin defeated Jason Cade	Singles match	8:33
6	Santana Garrett defeated Mia Yim	Singles match	12:28
7	Tom Lawlor defeated Jeff Cobb	Singles match	9:27
8	MVP defeated Sami Callihan	Singles match	12:04
9	Shane Strickland defeated Ricochet via submission	Singles match	33:56
