= Fury Road (2023) =

Major League Wrestling event

- Promotional poster of the event
- Promotion: Major League Wrestling
- Date: September 3, 2023
- City: Philadelphia, Pennsylvania
- Venue: 2300 Arena
- Attendance: 1,000-1,100

Event chronology
← Previous; Never Say Never	Next → Slaughterhouse

Fury Road chronology
← Previous; 2022	Next → —

Fury Road (2023) was a professional wrestling event produced by Major League Wrestling (MLW) that took place on September 3, 2023, at the 2300 Arena in Philadelphia, Pennsylvania. It was the fourth event under the Fury Road chronology and streamed live on FITE, with additional matches being taped for future episodes of MLW Fusion.

The event marked the beginning of a partnership with New Japan Pro Wrestling, with Kushida set to appear at the event. The event also featured the MLW in-ring debut of Matt Cardona on the live broadcast, who was announced to be signed with the promotion at Never Say Never in July.

== Production ==
=== Background ===
Other on-screen personnel
Role:	Name:
Commentators	Joe Dombrowski
Commentators	Matt Striker

MLW Fury Road was first held in 2018 as a television taping for MLW's weekly program, Fusion, with the second event airing as a special live episode on June 1, 2019.

On May 2, 2023, a new partnership between MLW and FITE was announced, under which the promotion would produce live events for FITE+ subscribers. MLW would subsequently announce four upcoming FITE+ specials on July 8, 2023, with Fury Road announced to be taking place on September 3 from the 2300 Arena in Philadelphia, Pennsylvania.

=== Storylines ===
The card consisted of matches stemming from scripted storylines, in which wrestlers portrayed villains, heroes, or less distinguishable characters. These storylines were designed to build tension and culminate in one or more wrestling matches, with results predetermined by MLW's writers. Storylines were played out on MLW's television programs, Underground Wrestling and Fusion, and the league's social media platforms.

At Never Say Never, the first two rounds of the 2023 MLW Open Draft were held, with Kevin Blackwood and Matt Cardona being drafted. Both men would later be announced to be making their MLW debuts at Fury Road.

On the July 20 episode of Fusion, Mister Saint Laurent, Cardona's new manager, was attacked by Mance Warner, in-retaliation for Laurent's betrayal of his former charge Microman. The following week, Laurent challenged Warner to a match at Fury Road on Cardona's behalf, which Warner accepted. The match was later made official on August 1 as a No Holds Barred Kiss My Foot match. Additionally, on August 9, MLW announced the debut of Laurent's new talk show, "Sessions by Saint Laurant," with a mystery guest to be revealed at Fury Road.

On the August 24 episode of Fusion, MLW announced a new partnership with New Japan Pro Wrestling. As part of this partnership, an inter-promotional match between Tony Deppen and New Japan representative KUSHIDA will take place at Fury Road.

Through MLW's "Open Door Policy", Japanese star Maki Itoh will also be appearing at Fury Road.

For the past couple of months, The Samoan SWAT Team (Jacob Fatu, Lance Anoa'i, and Juicy Finau) had been feuding with The Calling (Raven, Akira, and Rickey Shane Page). At Battle Riot V, seen on the April 25, 2023, episode of MLW Underground Wrestling on Reelz, Fatu would eliminate every member of The Calling in the titular match before eliminating himself alongside Page, where the two would continue to brawl with each other. On the August 17 episode of Fusion, Fatu defended the MLW National Openweight Championship against Page, only for the match to be declared a no-contest after Page shoved the referee. The two would continue to brawl after the match. Following this altercation, it was announced that Fatu would once again defend the title against Page in a Weapons of Mass Destruction match.

== Results ==
No.	Results	Stipulations	Times
1^{FT}	The Second Gear Crew (Matthew Justice and 1 Called Manders) defeated The Calling (Cannonball and Talon)	Tornado tag team match	4:59
2^{FT}	Love, Doug defeated Little Guido	Singles match	4:26
3^{FT}	Akira (c) defeated Jimmy Lloyd	Street Fight for the MLW World Middleweight Championship	8:58
4^{FT}	Matt Cardona (with Mr. Saint Laurent) defeated 1 Called Manders	Singles match	5:02
5^{FT}	Ichiban defeated Nolo Katana	Singles match	6:10
6^{FT}	Alex Kane defeated Snisky (with Mister Saint Laurent)	Singles match	4:32
7^{FT}	Tiara James defeated Zayda Steel	Singles match	3:12
8^{FT}	TJ Crawford defeated Kevin Blackwood and Alec Price	Three-way match	6:30
9^{FT}	The Bomaye Fight Club (J Boujji and Mr. Thomas) defeated The Mane Event (Jay Lyon and Midas Black)	Tag team match	6:09
10^{FT}	Akira vs. Matthew Justice ended in a no contest	Singles match	5:16
11	Rickey Shane Page defeated Jacob Fatu (c)	Weapons of Mass Destruction match for the MLW National Openweight Championship	15:21
12	B3cca defeated Maki Itoh	Singles match to determine the #1 contender to the MLW World Women's Featherweight Championship	7:42
13	Matt Cardona (with Mister Saint Laurent) defeated Mance Warner	No Holds Barred Kiss My Foot match	8:57
14	Ichiban defeated Tracy Williams	Singles match	9:51
15	Kushida defeated Tony Deppen	Singles match	12:18
16	Alex Kane (c) (with Mr. Thomas) defeated Willie Mack	Singles match for the MLW World Heavyweight Championship	17:56
(c) / – the champion(s) heading into the match; FT / – the match was taped for a future broadcast of Fusion
