= MLW Fury Road =

Fury Road
- Promotions: Major League Wrestling
- First event: Fury Road (2018)

Fury Road is an annual professional wrestling event produced by Major League Wrestling (MLW).

The first two events were television tapings for MLW Fusion, with the second event broadcast as a special live episode. The third event was a non-televised house show. In 2024, the event's name was used for a TV special; with matches taped at MLW Azteca Lucha on May 11, 2024.

== Dates and venues ==
Aired Live

#	Event	Date	City	Venue	Main event
1	Fury Road (2018)	October 4, 2018	Queens, New York City, New York	Melrose Ballroom	LA Park vs. PCO
2	Fury Road (2019)	June 1, 2019	Waukesha, Wisconsin	Waukesha County Expo Center	Mance Warner vs. Sami Callihan in a Falls Count Anywhere match
3	Fury Road (2022)	August 27, 2022	El Paso, Texas	Cathedral High School	Alex Hammerstone vs. Willie Mack
4	Fury Road (2023)	September 3, 2023	Philadelphia, Pennsylvania	2300 Arena	Alex Kane (c) vs. Willie Mack for the MLW World Heavyweight Championship
5	Fury Road (2024)	May 11, 2024 (aired on May 18, 2024)	Cicero, Illinois	Cicero Stadium	Satoshi Kojima (c) vs. 1 Called Manders for the MLW World Heavyweight Championship
6	Fury Road (2025)	September 13, 2025 (aired on September 27, 2025)	North Richland Hills, Texas	NYTEX Sports Centre	Austin Aries vs. Kushida in a 2025 Opera Cup tournament first round match

== 2018 ==
Fury Road (2018)
- Promotion: Major League Wrestling
- Date: October 4, 2018
- City: New York City, New York
- Venue: Melrose Ballroom
- Attendance: 500-600

Event chronology
← Previous; WarGames	Next → Fightland

Fury Road chronology
← Previous; First	Next → 2019

Fury Road (2018) took place on October 4, 2018 at the Melrose Ballroom in Queens, New York City, New York. It was a set of television tapings for future episodes of Fusion. It was the first event in the Fury Road chronology. Thirteen matches were contested at the event including a highly anticipated main event match between PCO and LA Park, which Park won. Other prominent matches on the undercard included a three-way elimination match for the World Middleweight Championship, Low Ki versus Daga for the World Heavyweight Championship and Jimmy Havoc versus Sami Callihan in a Spin the Wheel, Make the Deal match.

Results

No.	Results	Stipulations
1	Joey Ryan defeated Richard Holliday	Singles match
2	Puma King (with Konnan) defeated Ricky Martinez (with Salina de la Renta)	Singles match
3	Simon Gotch defeated Fallah Bahh	Singles match
4	The Smash n Dash Connection (Barrington Hughes and Kotto Brazil) defeated The Samoan Island Tribe (Lance Anoa'i and Samu)	Tag team match

== 2022 ==
Fury Road (2022)
- Promotion: Major League Wrestling
- Date: August 27, 2022
- City: El Paso, Texas
- Venue: Cathedral High School
- Attendance: 200-400

Event chronology
← Previous; Battle Riot IV	Next → Super Series

Fury Road chronology
← Previous; 2019	Next → 2023

Fury Road (2022) took place on August 27, 2022 at Cathedral High School in El Paso, Texas. It was originally supposed to be a set of television tapings for future episodes of Fusion, but those plans were cancelled, and the event became a house show. It was the third event in the Fury Road chronology.

No.	Results	Stipulations
1	Axel Lee and Vaquero Star defeated Koni Lao and Sky Bird	Tag team match
2	Sakura defeated Reina Dorada	Singles match
3	Mini Abismo Negro and Black Widow defeated Microman and Lady Shani	Mixed tag team match
4	Villano III Jr. defeated El Corbarde and Komander	Three-way match
5	Hernandez defeated Rey Escorpión	Singles match
6	Davey Richards defeated El Dragón	Singles match
7	Alexander Hammerstone defeated Willie Mack	Singles match

== 2024 ==
Fury Road (2024)
- Promotion: Major League Wrestling
- Date: May 11, 2024 (aired May 18, 2024)
- City: Cicero, Illinois
- Venue: Cicero Stadium
- Attendance: 600

Fury Road chronology
← Previous; 2023	Next → —

Fury Road (2024) was a television special that aired on May 18, 2024 on BeIN Sports USA and MLW's YouTube channel. It featured matches that were taped during MLW Azteca Lucha; which took place at Cicero Stadium in Cicero, Illinois on May 11, 2024.

No.	Results	Stipulations	Times
1	Jake Crist defeated Brett Ryan Gosselin by pinfall	Singles match	5:08
2	Akira defeated Bobby Fish by pinfall	Singles match	6:38
3	Alex Kane (with Mr. Thomas) defeated A-Game by referee stoppage	Singles match	1:12
4	Mads Krule Krügger defeated Matthew Justice by Pinfall	Falls Count Anywhere match	8:24
5	Janai Kai (c) defeated Delmi Exo, Miyu Yamashita and Zayda by submission	Four-way match for the MLW World Women's Featherweight Championship	6:45
6	Sami Callihan vs. Matt Riddle ended in a double countout	Singles match	7:38
7	Satoshi Kojima (c) (with Okumura) defeated 1 Called Manders by pinfall	Singles match for the MLW World Heavyweight Championship	9:22
(c) / – the champion(s) heading into the match
