= Alicia Atout =

Canadian journalist, YouTube personality, and professional wrestling personality

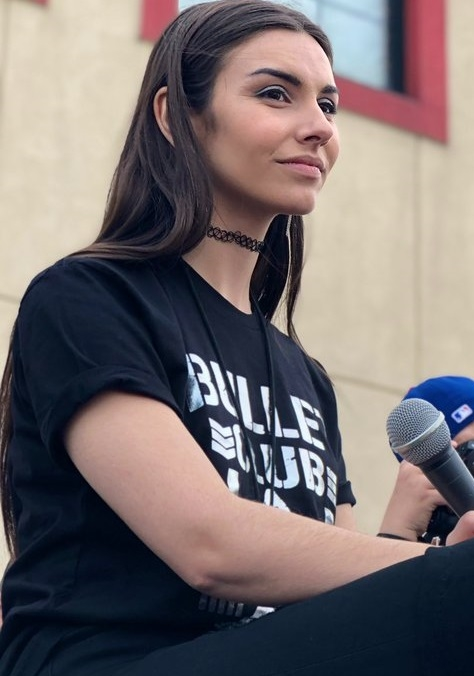
- Atout in 2019

Personal information
- Born: Alicia Claire Atout; 1 June 1995 (age 31) Toronto, Ontario, Canada
- Spouse: Maxwell Jacob Friedman (m. 2025)
- Website: amusicblogyea.com

Professional wrestling career
- Ring name(s): Alicia A Alicia Atout
- Billed from: Toronto, Ontario, Canada

YouTube information
- Channel: Alicia Atout
- Years active: 2012–present
- Genre: Interview
- Subscribers: 74.5 thousand
- Views: 20.1 million
- Last updated: 13 May 2026

Alicia Claire Atout-Friedman (/əˈtuː/ ə-TOO; born 1 June 1995) is a Canadian interviewer and YouTube personality. She is signed to All Elite Wrestling (AEW), and additionally works for Knotfest as a host on its Twitch channel.

Best known for her work in the music and professional wrestling industries, Atout runs her own music-oriented blog A Music Blog, Yea? (AMBY), as well her own YouTube channel where she interviews music and wrestling personalities. Atout previously worked with the professional wrestling promotions Beyond Wrestling, Impact Wrestling, and Major League Wrestling (MLW) and was the MC for professional wrestler Mick Foley's 20 Years of Hell speaking tour. She has also served as the backstage interviewer for numerous independent wrestling promotions, most notably appearing at the 2018 All In pay-per-view event.

== Career ==
=== A Music Blog, Yea? ===
The website A Music Blog, Yea? (AMBY) was founded by Atout in 2013 at the age of 17. She has since interviewed numerous musicians and bands for AMBY including Palaye Royale, Steel Panther, Dua Lipa, Bring Me the Horizon, Andy Biersack, Mac DeMarco, Melanie Martinez, One Ok Rock, and Greta Van Fleet. In its first year, AMBY won three music awards: the Canadian Weblog Awards for Best Media and Journalism Blog and Best Arts and Culture Blog, and the MiB Award for Best Canadian Art and Culture/Music Blog. With the rising popularity of AMBY videos on YouTube, Atout was able to expand her blog into covering other interests and soon began interviewing wrestling personalities such as Rey Mysterio, Paige, Chris Jericho, The Young Bucks, and Kenny Omega.

=== Professional wrestling career ===
Atout worked for Impact Wrestling from 2018 to 2019. She served as a backstage interviewer on the promotion's flagship Impact! television series, and co-hosted the weekly Behind The Lights web series on Impact Wrestling's Twitch channel alongside Anthony Carelli.

In September 2018, Atout participated in the All In pay-per-view event, co-promoted by Cody Rhodes. In 2019, after completing her work with Impact Wrestling, she was contacted by Rhodes and offered a position as backstage correspondent for the new All Elite Wrestling (AEW) promotion. Atout debuted for the promotion (using the ring name "Alicia A") at AEW's inaugural event Double or Nothing.

On 18 November 2019, it was announced that Atout had signed with Major League Wrestling (MLW), signaling her departure from AEW as a wrestler. On 21 January 2022, at MLW Blood & Thunder, Atout participated in an angle where she and Richard Holliday attacked Alexander Hammerstone, thus turning heel. On 21 March 2023, Atout announced her departure from MLW.

On 5 June 2024, Atout announced her return to AEW, assuming a position on the promotion's broadcasting team.

=== Other ventures ===
Atout has participated on various committees for national music award shows in Canada and the United States, working as a jury member for JUNOS, Polaris Music Prize, Prism Prize, and the East Coast Music Association. Atout also currently works for Budweiser and Hot Topic, serving as the Chief Music Officer for the former and Music Influencer for the latter. In 2022, Atout began working for Knotfest's Twitch channel, hosting their Knotfest Daily Streams series.

Atout creates content across multiple platforms with Salina de la Renta, who she first started working with at MLW, as "The Worsties".

== Personal life ==
In June 2025, Atout announced she was a permanent resident of the United States.

In February 2023, Atout, who is of Palestinian ancestry, started dating Jewish-American professional wrestler Maxwell Jacob Friedman. They married on September 5, 2025.

== Awards and accomplishments ==
=== Music ===
- Canadian Weblog Awards
  - Best Media and Journalism Blog (2013)
  - Best Arts and Culture Blog (2013)
- Feedspot
  - AMBY was included on the 2017 Feedspot Top 75 Canadian Music Blogs and Websites for Canadian Music Lovers list
  - AMBY was included on the Feedspot 100 Relaxing Music Youtube Channels To Follow in 2020 list
  - AMBY was included on the Feedspot 100 Relaxing Music Youtube Channels To Follow in 2022 list
  - AMBY ranked No. 68 on the 2016 Feedspot Top 100 Music Blogs, Websites & Newsletters list
  - AMBY ranked No. 3 on the 2017 Feedspot Top 50 Toronto Music Blogs list
  - AMBY ranked No. 23 on the 2017 Feedspot Top 75 Canadian Music Blogs & Websites & Newsletters list
  - AMBY ranked No. 5 on the 2020 Top 20 2020 Concert Photography Blogs And Websites list
  - AMBY ranked No. 3 on the 2020 Feedspot Top 60 Toronto Music Blogs and Websites On The Web list
  - AMBY ranked No. 14 on the 2020 Feedspot Top 70 Canadian Music Blogs & Websites list
  - AMBY ranked No. 66 on the 2022 Feedspot Top 100 Music Blogs and Websites list
  - AMBY ranked No. 3 on the 2022 Feedspot Top 50 Toronto Music Blogs and Websites list
  - AMBY ranked No. 13 on the 2022 Feedspot Top 70 Canadian Music Blogs and Websites list
  - AMBY ranked No. 5 on the 2022 Feedspot Top 15 Concert Photography Blogs and Websites list
- FYI Music News
  - AMBY was included on the 2017 FYI Canadian Music Blogs You Should Be Following list
- MiB Awards
  - Best Canadian Art and Culture/Music Blog (2013)
  - Best Canadian Arts and Entertainment Blog (2014)
