= Lucha Apocalypto =

- Promotions: Major League Wrestling; Consejo Mundial de Lucha Libre
- First event: Lucha Apocalypto (2024)

Lucha Apocalypto is a professional wrestling supercard event produced by Major League Wrestling (MLW) and Consejo Mundial de Lucha Libre (CMLL) that was first held on November 9, 2024.

== Dates and venues ==
#	Event	Date	City	Venue	Main event	Note	Ref
1	Lucha Apocalypto (2024)	November 9, 2024	Cicero, Illinois	Cicero Stadium	Místico (c) vs. Titán vs. Averno for the MLW World Middleweight Championship	Aired November 10, 2024	
2	Lucha Apocalypto (2026)	February 7, 2026	Cicero, Illinois	Cicero Stadium	Bishop Dyer vs. Mads Krule Krügger	Aired June 6‒June 20, 2026	
