= Cicero Stadium (Illinois) =

Multipurpose arena in Illinois, US

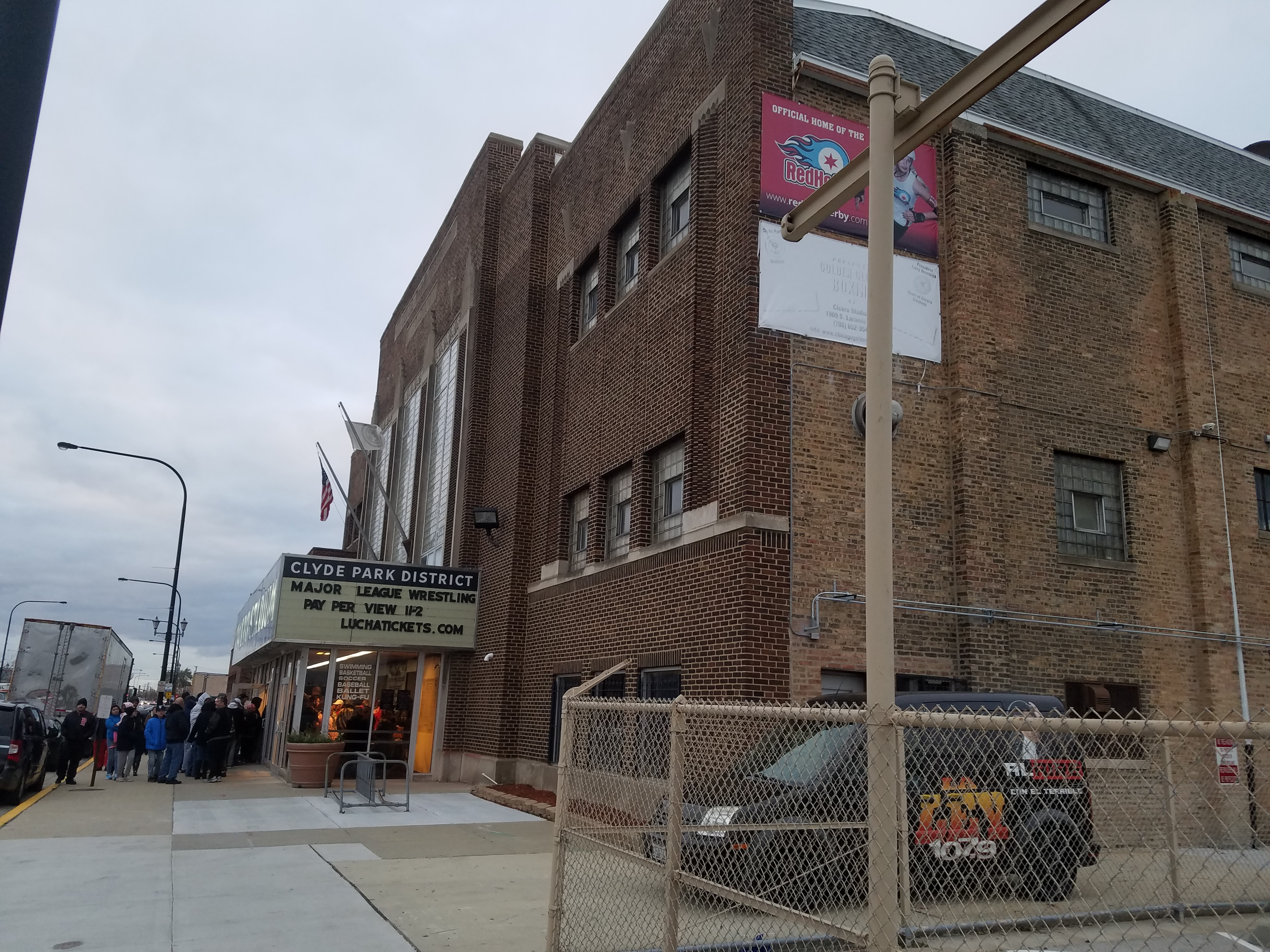
- Interactive map of Cicero Stadium
- Location: 1909 S Laramie Ave; Cicero, Illinois, US
- Coordinates: 41°51′15.2″N 87°45′12.9″W
- Owner: Town of Cicero
- Capacity: 1,800

Tenants
- Windy City Rollers (WFTDRA) (2004–2008); Chicago Outfit Roller Derby (USARS) (2007–2020); Chicago Red Hots (USARS) (2012–2018)

Cicero Stadium is a multipurpose arena located in Cicero, Illinois. It serves as a recreation and community center for the town. It has mainly been known for being the home of the Chicago Red Hots of USA Roller Sports from 2012 to 2018 and the Chicago Outfit Roller Derby from 2007 to 2020 and the Windy City Rollers of the Women's Flat Track Derby Association from 2004 to 2008, and the National Hellenic Invitational Basketball Tournament from the late 1940s to 1998.

== Notable events ==
The arena has hosted many professional wrestling shows from WWNLive's PROGRESS Wrestling and Evolve Wrestling promotions as part of their coast to coast tour in 2018, Total Nonstop Action Wrestling (formerly Impact Wrestling) with Emergence 2022, Bound for Glory 2023, and Against All Odds 2024, and Major League Wrestling with Fightland 2018, Saturday Night SuperFight in 2019, Intimidation Games 2019, Kings of Colosseum 2019, Fury Road 2024, Slaughterhouse 2024, and the Consejo Mundial de Lucha Libre co-produced shows Azteca Lucha 2024 and Lucha Apocalypto along with shows from Chicago-based lucha libre wrestling promotion Gladiadores Azteca de Lucha Libre Internacional.

Mixed martial arts fighter Isaac Johnson would die from injuries on November 21, 2025 soon after collapsing during a Matador Fighter Challenge that was held at the arena.
