= Fightland (2024) =

2024 Major League Wrestling event

- Promotional poster
- Promotion: Major League Wrestling
- Date: September 14, 2024
- City: Atlanta, Georgia
- Venue: Center Stage
- Attendance: 1,000

Event chronology
← Previous; Summer of the Beasts	Next → Lucha Apocalypto

Fightland chronology
← Previous; 2023	Next → 2025

Fightland (2024) was a professional wrestling live streaming event produced by Major League Wrestling (MLW). It took place on September 14, 2024, at Center Stage in Atlanta, Georgia. It was the sixth event in the Fightland chronology and featured the semi-finals and finals of the 2024 Opera Cup. The event streamed live on MLW's YouTube channel, with additional matches taped for the "Pit Fighters" special; which aired on September 26 on Bein Sports USA and YouTube.

== Production ==
=== Background ===
Other on-screen personnel
Role:	Name:
Commentators	Joe Dombrowski
Commentators	Christian Cole
Commentators	Saint Laurent
Commentators	Bobby Fish
Commentators	Brett Ryan Gosselin

Fightland is a recurring event produced by Major League Wrestling (MLW) that was first held in 2018 as a television taping for MLW's weekly program, MLW Fusion.

On June 3, 2024, MLW announced that Fightland would take place on September 14, 2024, at Center Stage in Atlanta, Georgia.

=== Storylines ===
The card will consist of matches that result from scripted storylines, where wrestlers portray villains, heroes, or less distinguishable characters in scripted events that built tension and culminate in a wrestling match or series of matches, with results predetermined by MLW's writers. Storylines are played out at MLW events, and across the league's social media platforms.

In addition to several freelancers per MLW's "Open Door Policy", wrestlers from partner promotions Consejo Mundial de Lucha Libre (CMLL) and New Japan Pro-Wrestling (NJPW) would also appear on the event. On September 2, 2024, NJPW's Kevin Knight was announced to face Bobby Fish at the event.

Contra Unit (Mads Krule Krügger, Ikuro Kwon, and later joined by Minoru Suzuki and MLW World Women's Featherweight Champion Janai Kai) have been feuding with CozyMax (MLW World Heavyweight Champion Satoshi Kojima and Shigeo Okumura) over the summer, dating back to former's assault on them at the end of War Chamber. On August 19, MLW announced that Kojima would defend the MLW World Heavyweight Championship against Krügger at Fightland. Suzuki and Kwon would then defeat CozyMax to win the MLW World Tag Team Championships at Summer of the Beasts on August 29.

Delmi Exo had been trying to regain the MLW World Women's Featherweight Championship from current champion Janai Kai since Kai defeated her at Slaughterhouse the previous October. Exo had been unsuccessful in recent opportunities at the Fury Road TV special (which was taped at MLW Azteca Lucha) and Battle Riot VI. After defeating Miyu Yamashita at Summer of the Beasts to become the number 1 contender, Exo would call out Kai. On September 10, MLW announced that Exo would face Kai for the title during the TV taping portion of Fightland in a Taekwondo Rules match; a martial art Kai regularly practices and utilizes.

==== Opera Cup ====
Fightland hosted both the semifinal and final matches of the 2024 Opera Cup tournament. On September 3, MLW officially announced the first semifinal between NJPW wrestlers Kenta (representing Bullet Club) and TJP (representing United Empire). The following day, the second semifinal was made official between MLW World Middleweight Champion Místico (representing Cesar Duran's Azteca Lucha) and MLW National Openweight Champion Bad Dude Tito (representing Salina de la Renta's Promociones Dorado). The winners of both matches would then meet in the finals later in the night.

== Reception ==
The live Fightland broadcast received mixed reviews, with the main criticism directed at its booking and several botched spots.

== Results ==
Fightland
No.	Results	Stipulations	Times
1	Kenta defeated TJP by pinfall	2024 Opera Cup tournament semifinal match	10:23
2	Místico defeated Bad Dude Tito by pinfall	2024 Opera Cup tournament semifinal match	8:03
3	Donovan Dijak (with Mister Saint Laurent) defeated Timothy Thatcher by pinfall	Singles match	8:16
4	The Andersons (C. W. Anderson and Brock Anderson) defeated The Bomaye Fight Club (Alex Kane and Mr. Thomas) by pinfall	Tag team match	10:44
5	Shigeo Okumura defeated Adam Priest by pinfall	Singles match	6:47
6	Satoshi Kojima (c) defeated Mads Krule Krügger by disqualification	Singles match for the MLW World Heavyweight Championship	7:07
7	Místico defeated Kenta by submission	2024 Opera Cup tournament final	17:49
(c) / – the champion(s) heading into the match

Pit Fighters (September 26)
No.	Results	Stipulations	Times
1	Bobby Fish (with The Rogue Horsemen (Brett Ryan Gosselin, C. W. Anderson and Brock Anderson)) defeated Kevin Knight by pinfall	Singles match	4:33
2	Janai Kai (c) defeated Delmi Exo by referee stoppage	Taekwondo Rules match for the MLW World Women's Featherweight Championship	4:07
3	Matthew Justice (with Bill Alfonso) defeated Jesús Rodríguez by pinfall	Barrio Brawl	9:07
4	Danny Stratos vs. Randall Royce ended in a no contest	Brazilian jiu-jitsu vs. Boxing match	2:00
5	Alex Kane (with Mr. Thomas) defeated Brett Ryan Gosselin by pinfall	Atlanta Street Fight	8:19
6	Ikuro Kwon defeated Akira by pinfall	Taipei Deathmatch	10:34
7	Matt Riddle defeated Tom Lawlor (with Mister Saint Laurent) by referee stoppage	Vale Tudo Rules match for Riddle's MLW World Heavyweight Championship opportunity	8:06
(c) / – the champion(s) heading into the match

=== Opera Cup tournament brackets (2024) ===
First round MLW Anniversary '24 (June 22); Blood & Thunder (July 12); Never Say Never (August 10)
Kenta	Pin
Bobby Fish	17:11
Akira	Pin
Ikuro Kwon	5:36
Timothy Thatcher	12:36
Davey Boy Smith Jr.^{1}	Pin
Tom Lawlor	TKO
Jake Crist	6:35
Místico	Pin
Magnus	14:02
Shigeo Okumura	8:26
Atlantis Jr.	Pin
Alex Kane	Pin
Mr. Thomas	5:51
Bad Dude Tito	Pin
Danny Jones	6:24

Quarterfinals; Summer of the Beasts (August 29)
Kenta	Pin
Akira	12:11
TJP^{1}	Pin
Tom Lawlor	13:50
Místico	Pin
Atlantis Jr.	18:26
Alex Kane	8:15
Bad Dude Tito	Pin

Semifinals; Fightland (September 14)
Kenta	Pin
TJP	10:23
Místico	Pin
Bad Dude Tito	8:03

Final; Fightland (September 14)
Kenta	17:49
Místico	Sub

1 Smith was forced to withdraw due to a knee injury, so as an alternate, TJP took his place.
