= Summer of the Beasts (2024) =

2024 Major League Wrestling event

- Promotional poster
- Promotion: Major League Wrestling
- Date: August 29, 2024
- City: Queens, New York
- Venue: Melrose Ballroom
- Attendance: 1,000

Event chronology
← Previous; Blood & Thunder	Next → Fightland

Summer of the Beasts chronology
← Previous; First	Next → 2025

Summer of the Beasts (2024) was a professional wrestling live streaming event produced by Major League Wrestling (MLW) that took place on August 29, 2024, at the Melrose Ballroom in Queens, New York. The event streamed live on MLW's YouTube channel. A "surprise" streaming special called "Summer of the Beasts: Part 2", featuring unseen dark matches from the event, and the Bobby Fish vs Timothy Thatcher match that was cut from the live broadcast due to technical issues, would be uploaded to YouTube on September 7.

The event was notable for the MLW debut of Donovan Dijak, and also saw the returns of TJP and Paul London; the latter having his first MLW match in 21 years.

== Production ==
=== Background ===
Other on-screen personnel
Role:	Name:
Commentators	Joe Dombrowski
Commentators	Christian Cole
Commentators	Brett Ryan Gosselin

On April 22, 2024, MLW announced that Summer of the Beasts would take place on August 29, 2024, at the Melrose Ballroom in Queens, New York.

=== Storylines ===
The card will consist of matches that result from scripted storylines, where wrestlers portray villains, heroes, or less distinguishable characters in scripted events that built tension and culminate in a wrestling match or series of matches, with results predetermined by MLW's writers. Storylines are played out at MLW events, and across the league's social media platforms.

Per MLW's "Open Door Policy," several freelancers and wrestlers from other promotions were announced to appear at the event. Names include New Japan Pro-Wrestling (NJPW) Kenta, Stardom rookie Hanako and Tokyo Joshi Pro-Wrestling (TJPW) star Miyu Yamashita. TJP, a former MLW talent that is currently signed to NJPW, was announced as an alternate for the Opera Cup tournament. Brock Anderson, the son of Arn Anderson, would also be announced for Summer of the Beasts, teaming with former MLW star C. W. Anderson. On August 22, Paul London, making his first MLW appearance since 2003, was announced for the event.

Contra Unit (Mads Krule Krügger, Ikuro Kwon, and Minoru Suzuki) have been feuding with MLW World Tag Team Champions CozyMax – MLW World Heavyweight Champion Satoshi Kojima and Shigeo Okumura – over the summer. On July 22, it was announced that CozyMax would defend their Tag Team Championships against Kwon and Suzuki at Summer of the Beasts. During the Never Say Never TV special on August 10, 2024 (which was taped at Blood & Thunder on July 12), Contra would attack Okumura backstage before defeating Kojima, Matt Riddle, and Akira in a 6-man tag team match later that night.

==== Opera Cup ====
The event will feature the quarterfinals of the 2024 Opera Cup tournament. The first match was announced on July 15, with NJPW's Kenta wrestling Akira. On August 12, they announced MLW World Middleweight Champion Místico would face fellow Consejo Mundial de Lucha Libre (CMLL) wrestler Atlantis Jr.. The following day, MLW National Openweight Champion Bad Dude Tito facing Alex Kane was made official.

World Titan Federation (WTF) stablemates Davey Boy Smith Jr. and Tom Lawlor, both former Opera Cup winners, were originally scheduled to face each other in the quarterfinals. However, on August 15, MLW announced that Smith had to withdraw due to an injury. As a result, tournament alternate TJP was announced as Smith's replacement.

== Reception ==
The early moments of the livestream were noted for its technical issues, resulting in the stream being pulled during the Timothy Thatcher vs. Bobby Fish match. MLW would attributed the issues to YouTube in a report from PWInsider. The match would later air as part of the "surprise" "Summer of the Beasts: Part 2" special uploaded the following week to MLW's YouTube channel.

== Results ==
No.	Results	Stipulations	Times
1^{D}	Delmi Exo defeated Miyu Yamashita by pinfall	Singles match	6:13
2^{D}	Mads Krule Krügger defeated Mr. Thomas (with Alex Kane) by pinfall	Singles match	5:31
3^{D}	Bobby Fish defeated Timothy Thatcher by pinfall	Singles match	11:16
4	Bad Dude Tito (with Jesús Rodriguez) defeated Alex Kane (with Mr. Thomas) by pinfall	2024 Opera Cup Tournament quarterfinal match	8:15
5	Janai Kai (c) defeated Hanako by submission	Singles match for the MLW World Women's Featherweight Championship	6:08
6	TJP defeated Tom Lawlor (with Mister Saint Laurent) by pinfall	2024 Opera Cup Tournament quarterfinal match	13:50
7	Matt Riddle defeated Matthew Justice by pinfall	Singles match	10:24
8	Paul London defeated Brett Ryan Gosselin (with Bobby Fish) by pinfall	Singles match	5:24
9	The Andersons (Brock Anderson and C. W. Anderson) defeated Jay Lyon and Love, Doug by pinfall	Tag team match	2:31
10	Kenta defeated Akira by pinfall	2024 Opera Cup Tournament quarterfinal match	12:11
11	Little Guido vs. Nolo Kitano vs. Jimmy Lloyd vs. LSG ended in a no contest	Four-way Scramble	2:00
12	Contra Unit (Ikuro Kwon and Minoru Suzuki) defeated CozyMax (Satoshi Kojima and Shigeo Okumura) (c) by pinfall	Tag team match for the MLW World Tag Team Championship	10:26
13	Místico defeated Atlantis Jr. (with Jesús Rodriguez) by pinfall	2024 Opera Cup Tournament quarterfinal match	18:26
(c) / – the champion(s) heading into the match; D / – this was a dark match
