= Blood & Thunder (2024) =

2024 Major League Wrestling event

- Promotional poster
- Promotion: Major League Wrestling
- Date: July 12, 2024
- City: St. Petersburg, Florida
- Venue: The Coliseum
- Attendance: 1,000

Event chronology
← Previous; Battle Riot VI	Next → Summer of the Beasts

Blood and Thunder chronology
← Previous; 2023	Next → 2025

Blood & Thunder (2024) was a professional wrestling live streaming event produced by Major League Wrestling (MLW), which took place on July 12, 2024, at The Coliseum in St. Petersburg, Florida. It was the fourth event under the Blood and Thunder chronology, and the first to be aired live. The event streamed live on MLW's YouTube channel, while additional matches were taped for Never Say Never, which aired as a TV special on August 10 on BeIN Sports USA and YouTube.

== Production ==
=== Background ===
Other on-screen personnel
Role:	Name:
Commentators	Joe Dombrowski
Commentators	Christian Cole
Commentators	Saint Laurent
Commentators	Bobby Fish
Commentators	Salina de la Renta

Blood and Thunder is a reoccurring event produced by Major League Wrestling (MLW) that was first held in 2019 as a television taping for MLW Fusion.

On September 3, 2023, at Fury Road, it was announced that Blood & Thunder would take place on January 6, 2024. On December 11, however, it was announced instead that Kings of Colosseum would be taking its place. On March 28, 2024, it was announced that Blood & Thunder would now take place on July 12, 2024, at The Colosseum in St. Petersburg, Florida.

=== Storylines ===
The card will consist of matches that result from scripted storylines, where wrestlers portray villains, heroes, or less distinguishable characters in scripted events that built tension and culminate in a wrestling match or series of matches, with results predetermined by MLW's writers. Storylines are played out at MLW events, and across the league's social media platforms.

The main feud going into the event centred around Matt Riddle and Sami Callihan. Riddle announced his intentions to become MLW World Heavyweight Champion in a post-match interview at MLW Azteca Lucha before Callihan abruptly attacked him. This resulted in a match between the two during the "Fury Road" television special, which ended in a no contest. At Battle Riot VI, Riddle last eliminated Callihan in the titular match to win, earning a world title opportunity. Callihan would later ambush Riddle again during the "MLW Anniversary '24" special, when the latter was giving another interview. The two would brawl throughout the event before ultimately being separated. Callihan then issued a challenge to Riddle to any type of match at Blood & Thunder. On June 25, MLW announced a No Ropes Deathmatch between Riddle and Callihan at Blood & Thunder for the latter's World title shot in the main event.

At War Chamber, Team MLW (Satoshi Kojima, Shigeo Okumura, Matthew Justice, and 1 Called Manders) defeated Team WTF (Tom Lawlor, Davey Boy Smith Jr., Richard Holliday, and Josh Bishop) in the titular match. They would be ambushed by Contra Unit shortly afterwards, and be attacked by Mads Krule Krügger, the returning Ikuro Kwon, and the Sentai Death Squad members. Since then, Krügger would be involved in a feud with the Second Gear Crew (SGC) (Justice and Manders) over the last three months, which included defeating Justice in a falls count anywhere match at Fury Road, taking out manager Bill Alfonso backstage, and targeting the SGC during Battle Riot VI. On June 12, MLW announced on their website that Krügger and Justice would face off at Blood & Thunder in a Three Stages of Destruction match; with the first stage being a First Blood match, the second stage a Street Fight, and the final stage being a Medical Evacuation match.

Akira would be targeted by Contra Unit during Battle Riot VI. After eliminating, and being eliminated by, Ikuro Kwon, Akira was thrown off the stage by Mads Krule Krügger. On June 13, Akira was announced to be facing Minoru Suzuki, who was revealed the newest member of Contra Unit during the Battle Riot, at Blood & Thunder.

==== Opera Cup ====
Several first-round matches in the 2024 Opera Cup were announced for Blood & Thunder and the TV tapings. The first match was announced on June 17, where MLW World Middleweight Champion Místico would face Magnus. Two days later, MLW World Tag Team Champion Shigeo Okumura was announced to face Atlantis Jr. as part of the first round. The next day, it was announced that 2020 Opera Cup winner Tom Lawlor would face Jake Crist.

During the MLW Anniversary '24 special, it was announced Kenta would make his debut for the promotion when he faces Bobby Fish in the first round. On July 2, Bomaye Fight Club teammates Alex Kane and Mr. Thomas were announced to face each other in the first round. On July 8, UK standout Danny Jones was announced to make his MLW debut against MLW National Openweight Champion Bad Dude Tito in the final first round match.

== Results ==
Blood & Thunder
No.	Results	Stipulations	Times
1	Atlantis Jr. defeated Shigeo Okumura by pinfall	2024 Opera Cup Tournament first round match	8:33
2	Tom Lawlor (with Mister Saint Laurent) defeated Jake Crist by technical submission	2024 Opera Cup Tournament first round match	7:09
3	Minoru Suzuki (with Ikuro Kwon) defeated Akira by pinfall	Singles match	11:18
4	Mads Krule Krügger (with the Sentai Death Squad) defeated Matthew Justice (with Bill Alfonso) 2–1	Three Stages of Destruction match: Stage 1: First Blood match (won by Justice); Stage 2: Street Fight (won by Krügger); Stage 3: Medical Evacuation match (won by Krügger)	19:18
5	Janai Kai (c) defeated Gigi Rey by pinfall	Singles match for the MLW World Women's Featherweight Championship	5:11
6	Kenta defeated Bobby Fish by pinfall	2024 Opera Cup Tournament first round match	17:15
7	Matt Riddle defeated Sami Callihan by submission	No Ropes Deathmatch for Riddle's MLW World Heavyweight Championship title shot	14:54
(c) / – the champion(s) heading into the match

Never Say Never (August 10)
No.	Results	Stipulations	Times
1^{D}	Gigi Rey defeated Gianna Gage	Singles match	—
2	Místico defeated Magnus by submission	2024 Opera Cup Tournament first round match	13:59
3	Bad Dude Tito Escondido (with Jesús Rodríguez and Salina de la Renta) defeated Danny Jones by pinfall	2024 Opera Cup Tournament first round match	6:18
4	Brett Ryan Gosselin defeated Jake Crist by pinfall	Singles match	2:49
5	A. J. Franci$ defeated Davey Boy Smith Jr. (with Mister Saint Laurent) by disqualification	Singles match	6:11
6	Delmi Exo (with Cesar Duran) defeated Renee Michelle by pinfall	Singles match	4:42
7	Alex Kane defeated Mr. Thomas by pinfall	2024 Opera Cup Tournament first round match	5:49
8	Paul Walter Hauser defeated Tom Lawlor by pinfall	MMA Cage match	14:17
9	Contra Unit (Mads Krule Krügger, Minoru Suzuki, and Ikuro Kwon) (with Janai Kai) defeated Satoshi Kojima, Matt Riddle, and Akira	Six-man tag team match	10:34
D / – this was a dark match
