= Battle Riot VI =

2024 MLW professional wrestling event

- Promotional poster of the event
- Promotion: Major League Wrestling
- Date: June 1, 2024
- City: Atlanta, Georgia
- Venue: Center Stage
- Attendance: 1,000

Event chronology
← Previous; Azteca Lucha	Next → Blood & Thunder

Battle Riot chronology
← Previous; V	Next → VII

Battle Riot VI was a professional wrestling live streaming event produced by Major League Wrestling (MLW), which took place on June 1, 2024, at the Center Stage in Atlanta, Georgia. It was the sixth event under the Battle Riot chronology, the first to air live since Battle Riot II in 2019, and featured the opening rounds of the 2024 Opera Cup.

The event was streamed on MLW's YouTube channel, while additional matches were taped for the "MLW Anniversary '24" special, which was also streamed on YouTube on June 22. The event featured the in-ring debuts of actor Paul Walter Hauser and YouTuber Chris Danger, as well as appearances by WWE Hall of Famers Mark Henry and Teddy Long.

== Production ==
=== Background ===
Other on-screen personnel
Role:	Name:
Commentators	Joe Dombrowski
Commentators	Christian Cole

Battle Riot is an annual event produced by Major League Wrestling that was first held in 2018 as a television taping for MLW Fusion. The event is named after the Battle Riot match, a multi-competitor match type in which wrestlers are eliminated until one is left and declared winner. The match begins with a number of participants in the ring, who are then eliminated by either pin, submission, or going over the top rope and having both feet touch the venue floor. The declared winner of the Battle Riot match receives a "golden ticket", which they can redeem for a future MLW World Heavyweight Championship title shot anytime and anywhere.

On February 19, 2024, it was announced that Battle Riot VI would take place on June 1, 2024, at Center Stage in Atlanta, Georgia.

In addition to MLW's regular roster, and several surprise appearances, guest personalities from outside of pro wrestling were announced as participants. On May 15, it was announced in a press release that actor Paul Walter Hauser would be in the Battle Riot match. On May 24, YouTuber Chris Danger announced in a social media post that he would enter the Battle Riot.

=== Storylines ===
The card consists of matches that result from scripted storylines, where wrestlers portray villains, heroes, or less distinguishable characters in events that built tension and culminate in a wrestling match or series of matches, with results predetermined by MLW's writers.

Alex Kane had been embroiled in a feud with World Titan Federation (WTF) member A. J. Franci$ since February's The Burning Crush special. At Intimidation Games, Franci$, making his in-person debut, confronted Kane after his match to claim that not every member of Kane's Bomaye Fight Club (BFC) was loyal to him. Franci$ would go on to defeat Kane in the former's in-ring debut at War Chamber due to interference from WTF promoter Mister Saint Laurent, a low blow, and a fast count from the referee. Several members of the BFC would come out after the match and raise their fists in salute to Franci$. During the Fury Road special, which aired on May 18, Kane defeated one of Franci$'s henchmen. After the match, Franci$, via vignette, challenged Kane to a "Ritual Combat match" at Battle Riot VI for control of the BFC, which Kane accepted.

Since losing the MLW World Women's Featherweight Championship to Janai Kai – then representing Salina de la Renta's Promociones Dorado – at Slaughterhouse the previous October, Delmi Exo has unsuccessfully attempted to recapture the title on multiple occasions. During the Once Upon A Time In New York special, which aired on March 16, Exo aligned herself with Azteca Lucha's Cesar Duran and defeated Zayda to become the #1 contender. In the aftermath of Salina's abduction by Duran at the end of the MLW Azteca Lucha event, Kai was revealed as a double agent for Contra Unit during the Fury Road TV special (which aired the following week); helping facilitate the group's return to prominence. Kai would then retain her title against Exo, Zayda, and Miyu Yamashita in a four-way match that same night. On May 23, MLW announced that Exo would finally get a one-on-one rematch against Kai for the Featherweight title at Battle Riot VI.

== Reception ==
The live broadcast received mixed reviews. While praise was given to the World Heavyweight title match, criticism was directed at the Ritual Combat match, the Featherweight title match, and the Duran-Salina segments.

== Results ==
Battle Riot VI
No.	Results	Stipulations	Times
1	Janai Kai (c) (with Ikuro Kwon) defeated Delmi Exo (with Cesar Duran) by pinfall	Singles match for the MLW World Women's Featherweight Championship	6:31
2	Alex Kane (with Faye Jackson and Mr. Thomas) defeated A. J. Franci$	Ritual Combat match The winner took control of the Bomaye Fight Club. The rules were that whoever sat on the throne between judges Mark Henry and Teddy Long for ten seconds untouched became the leader of the Bomaye Fight Club.	15:19
3	Satoshi Kojima (c) (with Shigeo Okumura) defeated Tom Lawlor by pinfall	Singles match for the MLW World Heavyweight Championship	11:53
4	Matt Riddle won by last eliminating Sami Callihan	40-man Battle Riot match for a future MLW World Heavyweight Championship match	50:29
(c) / – the champion(s) heading into the match

Anniversary '24 (June 22)
No.	Results	Stipulations	Times
1	Bobby Fish defeated Adam Priest by pinfall	Singles match	3:25
2	Davey Boy Smith Jr. (with Mister Saint Laurent) defeated Timothy Thatcher by pinfall	2024 Opera Cup Tournament first round match	12:36
3	Bad Dude Tito (c) (with Promociones Dorado (Salina de la Renta and Jesús Rodriguez)) defeated Jake Crist by pinfall	Singles match for the MLW National Openweight Championship	7:38
4	Akira defeated Ikuro Kwon by pinfall	2024 Opera Cup Tournament first round match	5:33
5	Místico (c) defeated Star Jr. by submission	Singles match for the MLW World Middleweight Championship	14:37
6	Miyu Yamashita defeated Jazzy Yang and Dani Jordyn by pinfall	Three-way match	4:15
7	Mads Krule Krügger defeated 1 Called Manders by pinfall	Bullrope match	8:42
(c) / – the champion(s) heading into the match

=== Battle Riot match entrances and eliminations ===
Draw	Entrant	Order	Eliminated by	Method of elimination	Elimination(s)
1	Místico	4	Star Jr.	Over the top rope	1
2	Jimmy Yang	2	Star Jr.	Pinfall	0
3	Star Jr.	6	Tom Lawlor and Josh Bishop	Over the top rope	2
4	Rugido	3	Tom Lawlor	Over the top rope	0
5	Jesús Rodriguez	1	Místico	Submission	0
6	Shigeo Okumura	5	Tom Lawlor	Over the top rope	0
7	Ikuro Kwon	8	Akira (Note: Kwon and Akira eliminated each other)	Over the top rope	1
8	Akira	9	Ikuro Kwon	Over the top rope	1
9	Tom Lawlor (Note: Tom Lawlor entered the match 3 times under different personas: himself, The Masked Assassin, and Arachnaman.)	7	Paul Walter Hauser	Over the top rope	3
10	Josh Bishop	11	Minoru Suzuki	Technical submission	1
11	Bobby Fish	13	Bad Dude Tito	Over the top rope	0
12	Bad Dude Tito	26	Matt Riddle	Over the top rope	2
13	Adam Priest	10	Minoru Suzuki	Over the top rope	0
14	Paul Walter Hauser	18	Sami Callihan	Over the top rope	3
15	Slim J	12	Paul Walter Hauser	Pinfall	0
16	Mads Krule Krügger	20	1 Called Manders (Note: Krügger and Manders eliminated each other.)	Over the top rope	1
17	Mr. Thomas	16	Bad Dude Tito	Over the top rope	0
18	Minoru Suzuki	35	Matt Riddle	Over the top rope	4
19	Brett Ryan Gosselin	23	Matthew Justice	Pinfall	1
20	C. W. Anderson	24	Alex Kane	Technical submission	0
21	Scotty Riggs	14	Paul Walter Hauser	Pinfall	0
22	Jake Crist	17	Brett Ryan Gosselin	Over the top rope	0
23	Violent J	15	Chris Danger	Pinfall	0
24	Chris Danger	31	Timothy Thatcher	Over the top rope	2
25	Ernest "The Cat" Miller	22	Matt Riddle	Pinfall	0
26	1 Called Manders	19	Mads Krule Krügger	Over the top rope	1
27	Sami Callihan	38	Matt Riddle	Over the top rope	2
28	The Masked Assassin	21	Alex Kane	Over the top rope	0
29	Alex Kane	34	Timothy Thatcher, Davey Boy Smith Jr., and Minoru Suzuki	Over the top rope	2
30	Matthew Justice	33	Sami Callihan	Over the top rope	3
31	Matt Riddle	–	–	Winner	4
32	Andrew Everett	28	Shane Mercer	Over the top rope	0
33	Kimchee	25	Chris Danger	Pinfall	0
34	Timothy Thatcher	37	Davey Boy Smith (Note: Thatcher and Smith eliminated each other.)	Over the top rope	2
35	Dr. Cornwallis	27	Minoru Suzuki	Submission	0
36	Suge D	29	Shane Mercer	Over the top rope	0
37	Rickey Shane Page	30	Sami Callihan	Pinfall	0
38	Shane Mercer	32	Matthew Justice	Over the top rope	2
39	Arachnaman	N/A (Note: Before Lawlor, as Arachnaman, could enter the ring, he was unmasked and chased off by Paul Walter Hauser. As Lawlor didn't enter the ring, he was never officially entered into or eliminated from the match.)	N/A	N/A	N/A
40	Davey Boy Smith Jr.	36	Timothy Thatcher	Over the top rope	2
