= Opera Cup (2024) =

2024 Major League Wrestling tournament

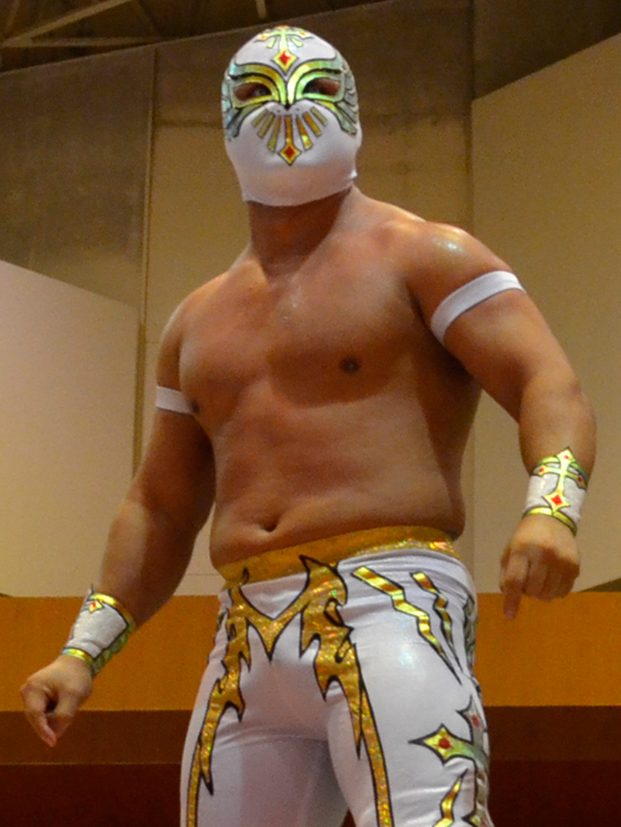
- The 2024 winner Místico
- Venue: First Round: Center Stage (June 1); The Coliseum (July 12); Quarterfinals: Melrose Ballroom (August 29); Semifinals & Final: Center Stage (September 14)
- Location: First Round: Atlanta, Georgia (June 1); St. Petersburg, Florida (July 12); Quarterfinals: Queens, New York (August 29); Semifinals & Final: Atlanta, Georgia (September 14)
- Start date: June 1, 2024
- End date: September 14, 2024
- Competitors: Akira; Alex Kane; Atlantis Jr.; Bad Dude Tito; Bobby Fish; Danny Jones; Davey Boy Smith Jr.; Ikuro Kwon; Jake Crist; Kenta; Magnus; Mr. Thomas; Shigeo Okumura; Timothy Thatcher; TJP (alternate); Tom Lawlor

Champion
- Místico

Opera Cup (2024) was the fifth Opera Cup professional wrestling tournament produced by Major League Wrestling (MLW). The first round started at Battle Riot VI on June 1, 2024; the matches would air on tape delay as part of the "MLW Anniversary '24" special on June 22. The first round continued on July 12 at Blood & Thunder as well as the Never Say Never special which aired on August 10. The quarterfinals were held on August 29 at Summer of the Beasts, and the semifinals and final were held on September 14 at Fightland.

== Production ==
=== Background ===
The Opera House Cup was annually held as a professional wrestling tournament for nearly fifty years in various cities in the United States until its discontinuation in 1948. Stu Hart won the final tournament and kept the possession of the Opera Cup trophy since then. On July 21, 2019, Major League Wrestling announced that it would be holding an event on December 5 at the Melrose Ballroom in Queens, New York City, New York which would be a set of television tapings of MLW's television program Fusion. On July 24, it was reported that Stu Hart's grandson and MLW wrestler Teddy Hart would be donating an inherited "family heirloom" to MLW. On July 30, MLW.com announced that the family heirloom was Stu Hart's Opera Cup trophy and MLW would be bringing back the Opera Cup tournament on the December 5 supercard, naming it Opera Cup.

At Battle Riot VI, the Opera Cup was announced to have sixteen participants this year, the most up to that point. The first round was later announced to start at the "MLW Anniversary '24" television special, which was taped the same day and aired on June 22.

== Results ==
First Round (June 1, aired June 22)
No.	Results	Stipulations	Times
1	Davey Boy Smith Jr. (with Mister Saint Laurent) defeated Timothy Thatcher by pinfall	Singles match	12:36
2	Akira defeated Ikuro Kwon by pinfall	Singles match	5:36

First Round (July 12)
No.	Results	Stipulations	Times
1	Atlantis Jr. defeated Shigeo Okumura by pinfall	Singles match	8:26
2	Tom Lawlor (with Mister Saint Laurent) defeated Jake Crist by technical submission	Singles match	6:35
3	Kenta defeated Bobby Fish by pinfall	Singles match	17:11

First Round (July 12, aired August 10)
No.	Results	Stipulations	Times
1	Místico defeated Magnus by pinfall	Singles match	14:02
2	Bad Dude Tito (with Jesús Rodriguez) defeated Danny Jones by pinfall	Singles match	6:24
3	Alex Kane (with Faye Jackson) defeated Mr. Thomas by pinfall	Singles match	5:51

Quarterfinals (August 29)
No.	Results	Stipulations	Times
1	Bad Dude Tito (with Jesús Rodriguez) defeated Alex Kane (with Mr. Thomas) by pinfall	Singles match	8:15
2	TJP defeated Tom Lawlor (with Mister Saint Laurent) by pinfall	Singles match	13:40
3	Kenta defeated Akira by pinfall	Singles match	12:11
4	Místico defeated Atlantis Jr. (with Jesús Rodriguez) by pinfall	Singles match	18:26

Semifinals (August 29)
No.	Results	Stipulations	Times
1	Kenta defeated TJP by pinfall	Singles match	10:23
2	Místico defeated Bad Dude Tito by pinfall	Singles match	8:03

Finals (August 29)
No.	Results	Stipulations	Times
1	Místico defeated Kenta by submission	Singles match	17:49

== Tournament brackets ==
First round MLW Anniversary '24 (June 22); Blood & Thunder (July 12); Never Say Never (August 10)
Kenta	Pin
Bobby Fish	17:11
Akira	Pin
Ikuro Kwon	5:36
Timothy Thatcher	12:36
Davey Boy Smith Jr.^{1}	Pin
Tom Lawlor	TKO
Jake Crist	6:35
Místico	Pin
Magnus	14:02
Shigeo Okumura	8:26
Atlantis Jr.	Pin
Alex Kane	Pin
Mr. Thomas	5:51
Bad Dude Tito	Pin
Danny Jones	6:24

Quarterfinals; Summer of the Beasts (August 29)
Kenta	Pin
Akira	12:11
TJP^{1}	Pin
Tom Lawlor	13:50
Místico	Pin
Atlantis Jr.	18:26
Alex Kane	8:15
Bad Dude Tito	Pin

Semifinals; Fightland (September 14)
Kenta	Pin
TJP	10:23
Místico	Pin
Bad Dude Tito	8:03

Final; Fightland (September 14)
Kenta	17:49
Místico	Sub

1 Smith was forced to withdraw due to a knee injury, so as an alternate, TJP took his place.
