= MLW Never Say Never (2023) =

2023 Major League Wrestling PPV event

- Promotional poster of the event featuring Alexander Hammerstone and Alex Kane
- Promotion: Major League Wrestling
- Date: July 8, 2023
- City: Philadelphia, Pennsylvania
- Venue: 2300 Arena

Event chronology
← Previous; Battle Riot V	Next → Fury Road

Never Say Never chronology
← Previous; 2021	Next → 2024

MLW Never Say Never (2023) was a professional wrestling event produced by Major League Wrestling (MLW) that took place on July 8, 2023, at the 2300 Arena in Philadelphia, Pennsylvania. It was the fifth event under the Never Say Never chronology, MLW's first event to be aired live since 2019, and their first live special produced for FITE+ subscribers.

In addition to the live broadcast, eleven of the matches on the card were taped for future episodes of MLW Fusion.

== Production ==
=== Background ===
Other on-screen personnel
Role:	Name:
Commentators	Joe Dombrowski
Commentators	Matt Striker

Never Say Never is a professional wrestling supercard event produced by Major League Wrestling (MLW) that was first held in 2017 as a television taping for MLW's weekly program, Fusion. On the May 2, 2023 episode of MLW Underground Wrestling, it was announced that the 2023 edition of Never Say Never would take place on July 8, 2023, at the 2300 Arena in Philadelphia, Pennsylvania.

Also on May 2, 2023, a new partnership between MLW and FITE was announced, in-which MLW would produce live events for FITE+ subscribers. Never Say Never would be the first event to air as part of this agreement. It will be MLW's first live broadcast since the 2019 Saturday Night SuperFight pay-per-view event, which was also carried on FITE, and the first to air live.

=== Storylines ===
The card will consist of matches that resulted from scripted storylines, where wrestlers portray villains, heroes, or less distinguishable characters in scripted events that built tension and culminated in a wrestling match or series of matches, with results predetermined by MLW's writers. Storylines are played out on MLW's television programs, Underground Wrestling and Fusion, and the league's social media platforms.

As a part of MLW's "Open Door Policy," several free agents are scheduled to appear at the event. This includes former WWE wrestler Gene Snisky, independent wrestler Ichiban, and the MLW return of Timothy Thatcher. Additionally, on June 30, MLW announced the return of the MLW Open Draft, with the first two rounds taking place at Never Say Never.

At Battle Riot V, Alex Kane won the titular match to earn a guaranteed match for the MLW World Heavyweight Championship. A few weeks later on the May 2 season finale of Underground Wrestling, it was announced that Kane would challenge champion Alexander Hammerstone for the title at Never Say Never.

Since Battle Riot V, The Samoan SWAT Team (Jacob Fatu, Lance Anoa'i, and Juicy Finau) began feuding with The Calling (Raven, Rickey Shane Page, and Akira), when Fatu eliminated every member of the Calling before he and Page eliminated each other. The two would continue brawling with each other in the back and by the entranceway. On the May 2 episode of Underground Wrestling, The Calling would attack Fatu as he made his entrance, putting Fatu out of action for some time. On June 1, MLW announced that Anoa'i and Fatu will defend their MLW World Tag Team Championship against Page and Akira of the Calling in a Fans Bring the Weapons match.

On June 14, MLW announced that B3cca would have a live concert at Never Say Never.

On June 20, wXw Women's Champion Ava Everett called out MLW World Women's Featherweight Champion Delmi Exo to a title vs. title match in the future. Two days later, MLW announced on their website that Exo and Everett will face off at Never Say Never, with both titles on the line.

On the June 15 episode of Fusion, after Sam Adonis had won his match, Mance Warner was having an interview on the entrance ramp. Adonis, not fond of his celebration being cut by a live interview, tried demeaning Warner by bringing up their past history in the Battle Riot, to which he was met with beer spat in his face by Warner. From there, Adonis' partner John Hennigan jumped Warner from behind, dragging him into the ring while Adonis went backstage. Adonis would later emerge with a leather strap, using one of the looped ends to choke Warner across the top rope. Two weeks later, Adonis would defeat Warner in a Country Strap match. Later in the show, a furious Warner challenged Adonis to a "Country Whipping Match," where both men would be armed with leather straps that they can use to whip their opponent with. Adonis accepted the challenge, and the match was made official for Never Say Never.

The Second Gear Crew (Mance Warner, Matthew Justice, and 1 Called Manders) also found themselves feuding with The Calling, stemming from when the latter beat the former and Alex Hammerstone at War Chamber. Additionally, Justice was supposed to take part in the Battle Riot, but an attack by The Calling forced Manders to take his place. As a result, MLW announced that The Second Gear Crew (Justice and Manders) will face The Calling's Delirious and Dr. Cornwallis in a tag team match on July 8.

== Results ==
No.	Results	Stipulations	Times
1^{FT}	Mr. Thomas (with O'Shay Edwards) defeated J Boujii	Singles match	2:45
2^{FT}	Jacob Fatu defeated Akira by disqualification	Singles match	0:36
3^{FT}	B3cca defeated Tiara James	Singles match	4:09
4^{FT}	Rickey Shane Page defeated Matthew Justice	Singles match	6:08
5^{FT}	Ichiban defeated TJ Crawford	Singles match	5:34
6^{FT}	Willie Mack defeated O'Shay Edwards, Ken Broadway, Nolo Kitano and Love, Doug	Five-way Scramble	9:12
7^{FT}	Gene Snisky (with Mister Saint Laurent) defeated Yoscifer El	Singles match	0:42
8^{FT}	Microman and The Mane Event (Jay Lyon and Midas Black) defeated Jesús Rodriguez and The FBI (Little Guido and Ray Jaz)	Trios match	5:42
9^{FT}	The Second Gear Crew (Matthew Justice and 1 Called Manders) defeated The Calling (Delirious and Dr. Cornwallis) and The Samoan SWAT Team (Lance Anoa'i and Juicy Finau)	Three-way tag team match	6:19
10^{FT}	Delmi Exo (c) defeated Paris Van Dale	Singles match for the MLW World Women's Featherweight Championship	2:29
11^{FT}	Microman vs. Sam Adonis ended in a no contest	Singles match	5:34
12	Jacob Fatu (c) defeated Calvin Tankman by pinfall	Singles match for the MLW National Openweight Championship	9:51
13	Delmi Exo (MLW) defeated Ava Everett (wXw) by pinfall	Winner Takes All match for the MLW World Women's Featherweight Championship and wXw Women's Championship	6:44
14	Tracy Williams defeated Timothy Thatcher by referee stoppage	Singles match	8:26
15	Mance Warner defeated Sam Adonis by pinfall	Country Whipping match	12:37
16	The Calling (Akira and Rickey Shane Page) defeated The Samoan SWAT Team (Lance Anoa'i and Juicy Finau) (c) by pinfall	Fans Bring the Weapons tag team match for the MLW World Tag Team Championship	11:18
17	Alex Kane (with The Bomaye Fight Club (Mr. Thomas and O'Shay Edwards)) defeated Alexander Hammerstone (c) by submission	Singles match for the MLW World Heavyweight Championship	22:28
(c) / – the champion(s) heading into the match; FT / – the match was taped for a future broadcast of Fusion
