= MLW Never Say Never =

Never Say Never
- Promotions: Major League Wrestling
- First event: Never Say Never (2017)

MLW Never Say Never is an annual professional wrestling event produced by Major League Wrestling (MLW) first held in 2017.

The first four events were television tapings for MLW Fusion, with the fourth event taped behind closed doors as a special episode. The fifth event was the first to air live, and MLW's first overall live broadcast since the 2019 Saturday Night SuperFight pay-per-view event. It would also be the first event to be produced as part of a partnership with Triller TV (formerly known as FITE), in-which MLW would produce live events for TrillerTV+ subscribers.

== Dates and venues ==
Aired Live

#	Event	Date	City	Venue	Main Event	Ref
1	Never Say Never (2017)	December 7, 2017	Orlando, Florida	GILT Nightclub	Darby Allin and Jimmy Havoc vs. John Hennigan and Shane Strickland	
2	Never Say Never (2018)	December 13, 2018	Miami, Florida	Scottish Rite Temple	Teddy Hart vs. Pentagón Jr.	
3	Never Say Never (2019)	July 25, 2019	Queens, New York City, New York	Melrose Ballroom	Jacob Fatu (c) vs. Tom Lawlor for the MLW World Heavyweight Championship	
4	Never Say Never (2021)	March 31, 2021	Orlando, Florida	GILT Nightclub	Jacob Fatu (c) vs. Calvin Tankman for the MLW World Heavyweight Championship	
5	MLW Never Say Never (2023)	July 8, 2023	Philadelphia, Pennsylvania	2300 Arena	Alexander Hammerstone (c) vs. Alex Kane for the MLW World Heavyweight Championship	
6	Never Say Never (2024)	July 12, 2024 (aired on August 10, 2024)	St. Petersburg, Florida	The Coliseum	Satoshi Kojima, Matt Riddle, and Akira vs. Contra Unit (Mads Krule Krügger, Minoru Suzuki, and Ikuro Kwon)	

== 2024 ==
Never Say Never (2024)
- Promotion: Major League Wrestling
- Date: July 12, 2024 (aired August 10, 2024)
- City: St. Petersburg, Florida
- Venue: The Coliseum

Never Say Never chronology
← Previous; 2023	Next → —

Never Say Never (2024) was a television special that aired on August 10, 2024 on BeIN Sports USA and MLW's YouTube channel. It featured matches that were taped during Blood & Thunder; which took place at The Coliseum in St. Petersburg, Florida on July 12, 2024.

No.	Results	Stipulations	Times
1^{D}	Gigi Rey defeated Gianna Gage	Singles match	—
2	Místico defeated Magnus by submission	2024 Opera Cup Tournament first round match	13:59
3	Bad Dude Tito Escondido (with Jesús Rodríguez and Salina de la Renta) defeated Danny Jones by pinfall	2024 Opera Cup Tournament first round match	6:18
4	Brett Ryan Gosselin defeated Jake Crist by pinfall	Singles match	2:49
5	A. J. Franci$ defeated Davey Boy Smith Jr. (with Mister Saint Laurent) by disqualification	Singles match	6:11
6	Delmi Exo (with Cesar Duran) defeated Renee Michelle by pinfall	Singles match	4:42
7	Alex Kane defeated Mr. Thomas by pinfall	2024 Opera Cup Tournament first round match	5:49
8	Paul Walter Hauser defeated Tom Lawlor by pinfall	MMA Cage match	14:17
9	Contra Unit (Mads Krule Krügger, Minoru Suzuki, and Ikuro Kwon) (with Janai Kai) defeated Satoshi Kojima, Matt Riddle, and Akira	Six-man tag team match	10:34
D / – this was a dark match
