= MLW Never Say Never (2019) =

2019 Major League Wrestling professional wrestling event

Never Say Never (2019)
- Promotion: Major League Wrestling
- Date: July 25, 2019
- City: New York, New York
- Venue: Melrose Ballroom

Event chronology
← Previous; Kings of Colosseum	Next → War Chamber

Never Say Never chronology
← Previous; 2018	Next → 2021

Never Say Never (2019) was a professional wrestling event produced by Major League Wrestling (MLW), which took place on July 25, 2019, at the Melrose Ballroom in New York City, New York. The event was a television taping for future episodes of Fusion on beIN Sports. It was the third event in the Never Say Never chronology.

Fourteen professional wrestling matches were taped at the event with most of the matches airing on future episodes of Fusion. In the main event, Jacob Fatu successfully defended the World Heavyweight Championship against Tom Lawlor. In other prominent matches on the card, L.A. Park defeated Jimmy Havoc in a New York City Street Fight, Teddy Hart retained the World Middleweight Championship against MJF and Alexander Hammerstone retained the National Openweight Championship against the debuting Savio Vega. The event also featured the MLW debut of Spirit Squad (Kenny and Mikey) as they competed against The Von Erichs (Marshall and Ross) in a losing effort.

== Production ==
=== Background ===
In July 2017, Major League Wrestling resumed promoting events for the first time since the promotion's original closure in 2004. The success of these events lead MLW to secure a television deal with beIN Sports for a new program, MLW Fusion, which debuted on April 20, 2018.

On April 9, 2019, it was announced on MLW's website that the third edition of Never Say Never would take place on July 25 at the Melrose Ballroom in New York City.

=== Storylines ===
On March 26, it was announced that LA Park would take on Jimmy Havoc in a New York City Street Fight at Battle Riot II. However, Havoc withdrew from the match due to his injury. The match was later set for Never Say Never.

On June 12, it was announced that Austin Aries would be returning to MLW at Never Say Never. It was later announced that Aries would take on Ace Austin at the event.

On June 18, it was announced that Savio Vega would make his MLW debut. Billed as the Caribbean Heavyweight Champion, Vega was supposed to take on Alexander Hammerstone for the latter's National Openweight Championship.

On June 21, it was announced that Timothy Thatcher would be making his MLW debut. It was announced on July 9 that Thatcher would be taking on Davey Boy Smith Jr. in the former's MLW debut at Never Say Never.

On June 30, it was announced that Zenshi would be making his MLW debut at Never Say Never.

At Kings of Colosseum, Jacob Fatu defeated Tom Lawlor to win the World Heavyweight Championship. On July 10, Lawlor invoked his rematch clause against Fatu with the rematch set for Never Say Never.

On July 11, it was announced that Bestia 666 and Rey Horus would compete in a match at Never Say Never.

The ongoing rivalry between The Hart Foundation and The Dynasty continued as it was announced that Teddy Hart would defend the World Middleweight Championship against MJF and Brian Pillman Jr. would take on Richard Holliday.

== Results ==
No.	Results	Stipulations	Times
1^{FT}	Low Ki defeated Jimmy Yuta	Singles match (Fusion – August 3)	0:32
2^{FT}	The Von Erichs (Marshall and Ross) defeated The Spirit Squad (Kenny and Mikey)	Tag team match (Fusion – August 3)	4:00
3^{FT}	Davey Boy Smith Jr. defeated Timothy Thatcher	Singles match (Fusion – August 3)	4:00
4^{FT}	Mance Warner defeated Ricky Martinez (with Salina de la Renta)	Singles match (Fusion – August 17)	2:04
5^{FT}	Injustice (Jordan Oliver, Kotto Brazil and Myron Reed) defeated Air Wolf, Gringo Loco and Zenshi	Six-man tag team match (Fusion – August 31)	10:04
6^{FT}	Brian Pillman Jr. defeated Richard Holliday	Singles match (Fusion – September 9)	7:09
7^{FT}	Bestia 666 (with Salina de la Renta) defeated Rey Horus	Singles match (Fusion – August 10)	9:38
8^{FT}	Contra Unit (Josef Samael and Simon Gotch) defeated Ariel Dominguez and Jay Sky	Tag team match (Fusion – August 10)	0:31
9^{FT}	Alexander Hammerstone (c) defeated Savio Vega	Singles match for the MLW National Openweight Championship (Fusion – August 10)	7:40
10^{FT}	Austin Aries defeated Ace Austin	Singles match (Fusion – August 17)	8:46
11^{FT}	Zenshi defeated El Hijo de LA Park	Singles match (Fusion – August 24)	5:57
12^{FT}	Teddy Hart (c) defeated MJF (with Aria Blake)	Singles match for the MLW World Middleweight Championship (Fusion – August 24)	12:01
13^{FT}	LA Park defeated Jimmy Havoc	New York City Street Fight (Fusion – August 17)	12:42
14^{FT}	Jacob Fatu (c) (with Josef Samael) defeated Tom Lawlor	Singles match for the MLW World Heavyweight Championship (Fusion – August 31)	15:14
(c) / – the champion(s) heading into the match; FT / – the match was taped for a future broadcast of Fusion
