= Brock Anderson =

American professional wrestler

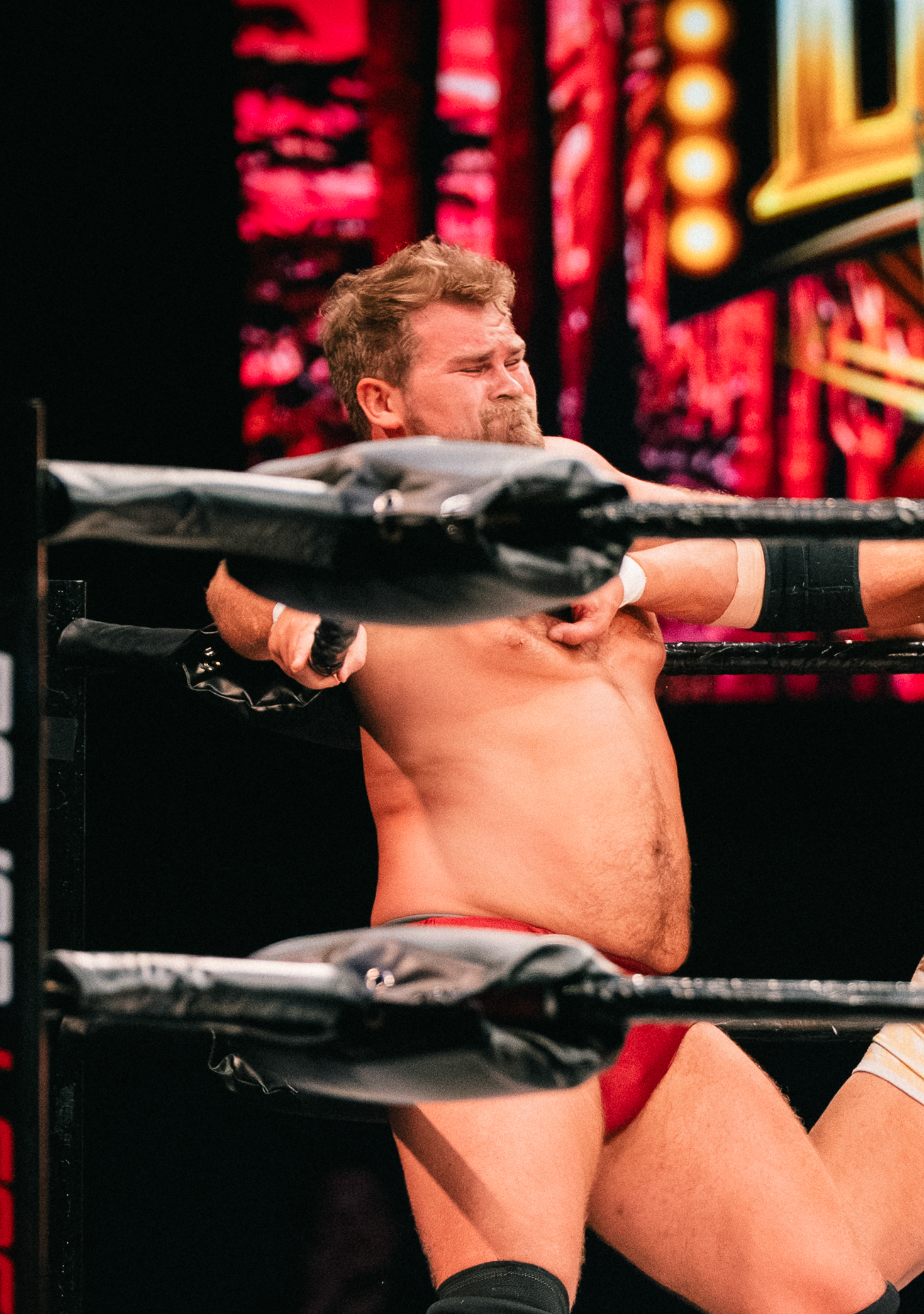
- Anderson in 2025

Personal information
- Born: Brock Alexander Lunde; February 28, 1997 (age 29) Charlotte, North Carolina, U.S.
- Education: East Carolina University
- Parents: Arn Anderson (father); Erin Lunde (mother)
- Family: Anderson

Professional wrestling career
- Ring name: Brock Anderson
- Billed height: 6 ft 0 in (183 cm)
- Billed weight: 209 lb (95 kg)
- Billed from: Charlotte, North Carolina
- Trained by: Arn Anderson; Q. T. Marshall; Glacier; Lodi
- Debut: June 6, 2021

Brock Alexander Lunde (born February 28, 1997), better known by the ring name Brock Anderson, is an American professional wrestler. He currently performs on the independent circuit. He is best known for his tenure in All Elite Wrestling (AEW) from 2021 to 2023. He is the son of WWE Hall of Fame wrestler Arn Anderson.

== Professional wrestling career ==
=== Education and training (2019–2021) ===
Lunde has stated that he had wanted to become a professional wrestler since the age of twelve. He wanted to begin his wrestling career immediately after high school, during which he was also a highly-ranked football player, but his parents encouraged him to go to college first. He graduated from East Carolina University in 2019 and began training as a professional wrestler in 2021.

=== All Elite Wrestling (2021–2023) ===
Prior to Lunde's first appearance, he had been spotted at All Elite Wrestling (AEW) events. On the March 29, 2021, episode of the podcast The Arn Show on the Ad Free Shows network, it was revealed by Lunde's father Arn Anderson that Lunde had signed a contract with AEW and had been training by Q. T. Marshall and Glacier at the Nightmare Factory, AEW's training facility. Lunde was also trained by professional wrestler Lodi.

Lunde first appeared on the June 11, 2021 (taped June 5) episode of AEW Dynamite. In an interview with Tony Schiavone, Lunde alongside his father and performer/executive vice-president of AEW Cody Rhodes, announced that he would be wrestling with the company as Brock Anderson as a new member of the Nightmare Family. Anderson made his professional wrestling debut on June 18, 2021 (taped June 6). He teamed with fellow Rhodes defeating Q. T. Marshall and Aaron Solow in a match on Dynamite. About his debut, Anderson stated that he was nervous but credited Cody Rhodes as a calming force. In response to the debut, Jim Cornette said that, despite many positives, Brock’s lack of experience showed and he needed more matches in front of smaller crowds before he should return to national television. He also thought Brock getting the pin on his debut was “a little gratuitous” and “too obvious”.

Since debuting, Anderson has also performed in matches on AEW Dark and AEW Dark: Elevation, including matches with and against Billy Gunn and his son Colten Gunn. In July 2022, he teamed with Brian Pillman Jr. to challenge the Rock 'n' Roll Express as part of Ric Flair's Last Match. The team of Anderson and Pillman went on to win the match by pinfall. Anderson's initial contract with the promotion was set to expire in May 2023. Later that year he took some time away from wrestling to improve his physique. He returned to action in June in noticeably better shape. On October 10, 2023, Anderson's profile was removed from the AEW active roster page.

=== Major League Wrestling (2024–present) ===
At MLW Never Say Never on August 10, 2024, it was revealed that Anderson, alongside C.W. Anderson, would be making his MLW debut at MLW Summer of the Beasts on August 29, 2024, forming a new tag team incarnation of The Andersons. At the event, Brock and C.W. Anderson appeared to assist Brett Ryan Gosselin and Bobby Fish in an attack on Paul London. The Andersons then won their debut match against Jay Lyon and Love, Doug at the event; post-match, they aligned themselves with Fish and Gosselin.

== Personal life ==
Lunde is the son of retired professional wrestler and WWE Hall of Famer Marty Lunde, who is best known as Arn Anderson. He had a brother named Barrett, who died on March 10, 2023 at age 37; his death was announced the next day.

In 2015, Lunde graduated from Providence High School. In high school Lunde played football, being ranked 94th among graduating linebackers in North Carolina and 904th in the United States. After high school Lunde went to college at East Carolina University and graduated in 2019.

== Filmography ==
=== Television ===
Year	Title	Role	Notes
2021	Rhodes To The Top	Himself	
