= Rickey Shane Page =

American professional wrestler (born 1984)

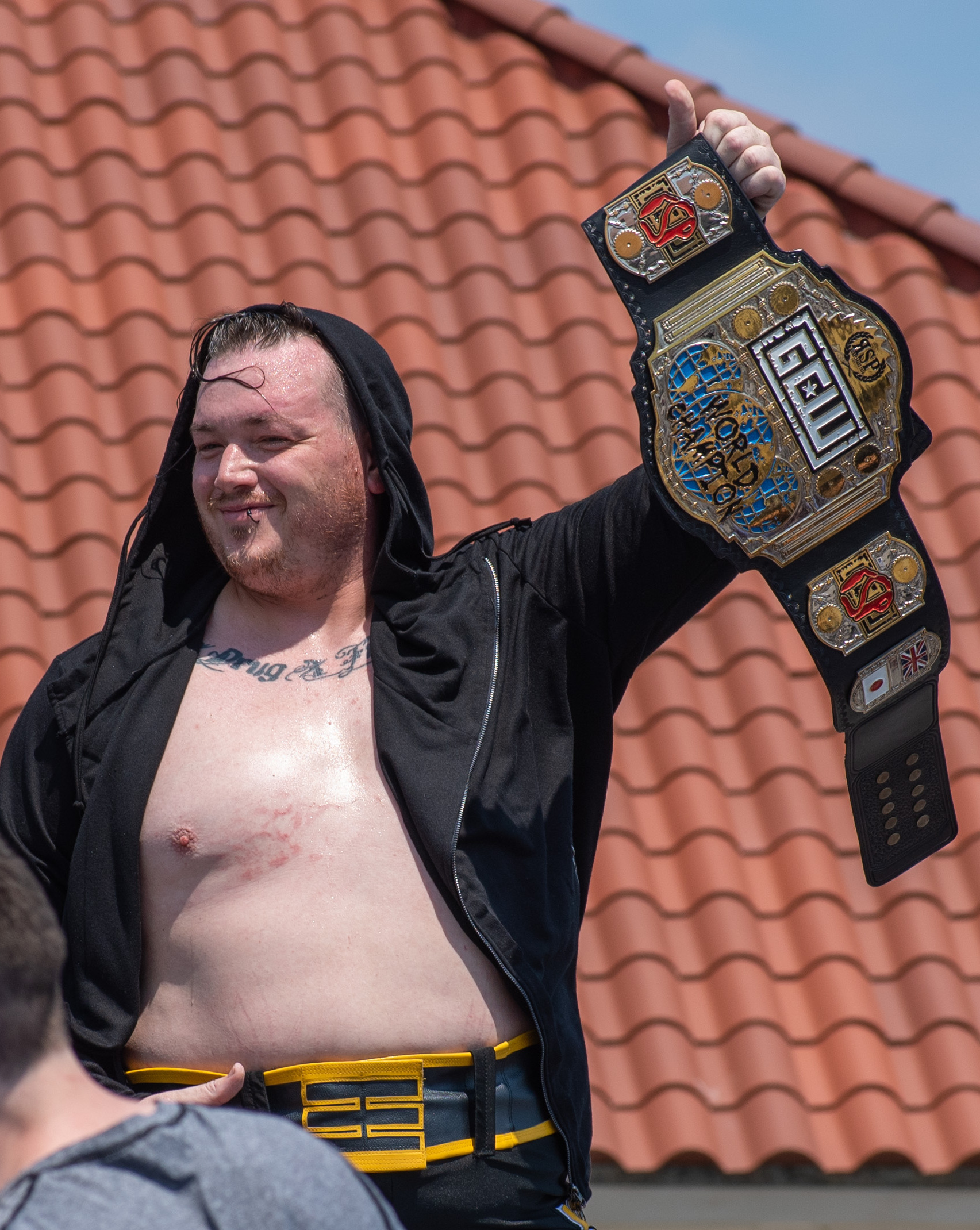
- Page as the GCW World Champion in July 2020

Personal information
- Born: Richard Page; March 1, 1984 (age 42) Lordstown, Ohio, U.S.

Professional wrestling career
- Ring name(s): Bob The Boy Band Reject Crash; Christian Faith; Judge Hugo Lexington Black; Rickey Crash; Rickey Shane Page; Retarded Rickey; RSP
- Billed height: 6 ft 5 in (1.96 m)
- Billed weight: 282 lb (128 kg)
- Billed from: Sandusky, Ohio
- Trained by: Chris Kole
- Debut: 2003

Rickey Shane Page (born March 1, 1984) is an American professional wrestler. He currently wrestles on the independent circuit.

Page started out as a backyard wrestler before making the transition to professional wrestling, where he was trained by Chris Kole, and debuted in 2003. He wrestled under a mask as Christian Faith on the independent circuit, and regularly teamed with Vincent Nothing, becoming multiple-time tag champions in different promotions. Despite the popularity of his partnership with Nothing, he began wrestling under his own name in 2011, and retired the Christian Faith character in 2015. Page is known for his work in Combat Zone Wrestling (CZW), where he was a one-time CZW Heavyweight Champion and the winner of the CZW Tournament of Death in 2016. The following year, he became IWA Mid-South's King of the Deathmatch, becoming one of five men to have won both CZW and IWA Mid-South's annual deathmatch tournaments. He is also known for his work in Game Changer Wrestling (GCW), where he is a one-time GCW World Champion.

== Professional wrestling career ==
=== Combat Zone Wrestling (2015–2018) ===
After making two appearances in November 2011, and February 2012 as a heel and in winning efforts, Page began making more frequent appearances for Combat Zone Wrestling (CZW) in 2015. This began at Tournament of Death 14, where he lost to Danny Havoc in the first round. Page and Havoc showed respect to one another after the match, establishing Page as a face. At Cage of Death, he faced Havoc again in a losing effort, and later at Seventeen with a spot on the roster on the line in another losing effort. He would continue to try and earn a spot on the roster by entering the 2015 Best of the Best tournament making it to the semi-finals, where he was defeated by Jonathan Gresham. He would eventually earn a spot on the roster by winning Tournament of Death 15, defeating Tim Donst in the first round, Conor Claxton in the semi-finals, and then CZW World Champion Matt Tremont in the finals. Page would spend the rest of the year teaming with Havoc and continuing their feuds with Tim Donst and Alex Colon respectively. They lost a tag team match to Donst and Colon at The Boss is Back, and eventually, all four would compete in the Tangled Web, with the opportunity for any match of their choosing. Havoc would go on to win the match, and selected a match with Page at Cage of Death, where Page was finally victorious.

Page earned a world title opportunity against Joe Gacy where he came up short, and lost his next two matches against Dave Crist and Maxwell Jacob Friedman. He would then win an eight man Ultimate Opportunity scramble match, where the winner would be awarded a coin that signified that they could cash in for a title shot for the World Championship any time they wanted. Page would continue to lose matches throughout the rest of the year until November, where he would cash in his opportunity for a world title match against Gacy, who had just defeated Shane Strickland for the title, despite claiming he would cash in his opportunity at Cage of Death in the namesake match. Page would then challenge both men to a three-way Cage of Death match where he came up victorious. Page defended the title against Tremont and Ethan Page, as well as in other promotions. He was defeated by Friedman at Best of the Best 17, ending his reign at 154 days. Page would also make it to the finals of Tournament of Death 17, before losing to Jimmy Lloyd. Page spent the remainder of the year feuding with Friedman, earning another shot at the title by defeating Mance Warner in the #1 Contendership tournament final, with their match supposed to take place inside the Cage of Death. However, due to Friedman suffering an injury, the title would be vacated. In order to determine a new champion, Page would again face Warner, this time inside the Cage of Death for the vacant title. Page would go on to lose the match in what would turn out to be his final appearance in the company.

=== Game Changer Wrestling (2018–2021) ===
On April 7, 2018, Page made his first appearance for Game Changer Wrestling (GCW) at Joey Janela's Spring Break 2 on WrestleMania weekend. He took part in the Clusterfuck Battle Royal, and was eliminated by Ethan Page, in a match eventually won by The Invisible Man. He returned a year later, as a heel, on September 22, 2019, at the Nick Gage Invitational. He blindsided Gage and then stole his championship belt before spray-painting his initials onto it (in the manner of what the New World Order did to the Big Gold Belt), and walking out of the building. Page then began unofficially defending the belt in other promotions around the world, which Gage cannot do because of his conviction. In October, Page returned to the United States to work a Horror Slam event that Gage was also booked for. He was ambushed by Gage and his allies, leaving his bag behind, which did not contain the stolen belt. On October 31, at Jimmy Lloyd's Halloween Fright Fest, Atticus Cogar aligned himself with Page, and after Gage's match with Ruckus, distracted him so Page could attack him from behind with a chair and then a broken off door. Gage caught up with Page and his 44.OH stablemates in an Uber, and kidnapped Cogar and Gregory Iron. On December 8, at Long. Live. GCW., Page appeared at the show and goaded Gage into an anytime, anywhere title shot. In the main event, Gage's almost two year long reign ended when he was defeated by AJ Gray, following interference from Cogar and Iron. In the aftermath of the match, Page used his title shot on an exhausted Gray, squashing him to win the GCW World Championship.

In January 2020, Page started wrestling non-title matches as GCW began to hold events across the country, and introduced the chokebreaker as his finisher, usually used by Gage, to further taunt his rival. This began on January 11, at I Can't Feel My Face, when Page faced veteran "Spyder" Nate Webb. Towards the end, Page suplexed Webb through a door and hit him with a super chokebreaker to win the match. He attempted to continue attacking Webb, and Gage appeared to brawl with him and 44.OH, until Killer Kross jumped Gage, beginning their match. On January 18, at Take A Picture, Page defeated Mance Warner. 44.OH began to beat down on Warner after the match, while Page set up a glass pane between two chairs. Gage made the save, but Page quickly left the ring, and allowed Iron to face off with Gage, to which Gage put him through the glass pane. In the days prior to Just Being Honest, Effy answered Page's open challenge. At the event, Page hit a chokebreaker for a near fall, which Effy kicked out of and then flipped him off, so Page hit him with several chokebreakers to win the match. After Gage's match against Matthew Justice, Page jumped him from behind mid promo, while he was thanking the crowd following the death of his brother, Justice Pain. Page immediately bailed when the rest of the wrestlers on the card came out to make the save, and Gage challenged Page to an anything goes deathmatch for the title in Atlantic City, New Jersey. On February 15, at Run Rickey Run, Page faced Gage in his first official defence of the title since winning it two months previously. In a match that saw constant interference from 44.OH, two referee bumps, co-owner Brett Lauderdale acting as referee and then refusing to count a pinfall, and Eric Ryan defecting to join 44.OH, Page finally defeated Gage with a chokebreaker through a stack of light tubes. After the match, the crowd pelted Page and 44.OH with garbage while they celebrated in the ring.

From late March to mid May, Page did not wrestle for GCW due to lockdowns arising from the ongoing COVID-19 pandemic, but he returned to the promotion on June 20, at The Wrld On GCW Part 2, held in Indianapolis, Indiana. He teamed with Cogar, defeating The Second Gear Crew (Mance Warner and Matthew Justice). On July 25, at Homecoming Part 1, after Page had defeated Homicide, SHLAK came out to brawl with the members of 44.OH who had earlier interfered in his match, before being hit with a lariat from Page. Gage came out from the back and told Page that he would put his career on the line for a title shot. In response, Page told Gage that if any of his crew pinned a member of 44.OH, he would get a anytime, anywhere title shot. The following day, at Homecoming Part 2, Team MDK defeated 44.OH, and despite Gage suffering from an achilles injury (having wrestled for Beyond that afternoon), he was able to pin Ryan to win the title shot. On August 28, Page participated in his first Tournament of Survival. After defeating Jimmy Lloyd and fellow stablemate Ryan, Page faced Alex Colon in the final, who had won the tournament the year before. Colon overcame recurring interference from 44.OH, and won the match by hitting a Spanish Fly off the top rope and through a light tube tower of which Page was underneath. In the autumn, Page continued wrestling non-title matches like he did at the start of the year, where he defeated Justice and Blake Christian, but lost to Orange Cassidy in an upset. On November 7, at the Nick Gage Invitational, 44.OH jumped Mance Warner, who had just won the tournament, by attacking him with light tubes. Gage came out to make the save and told Page that he would fight him there and then, but Page refused and put his title on the line against Warner. The next night at So Much Fun, Page defeated Warner, which would be his last defence of the year. On January 31, 2021, at Fight Forever: The Wrld On GCW Part III, Page defeated Christian, who had put his GCW career on the line. On March 7, at Take Kare, Page defeated Janela, and in doing so, earned the right to the Spring Break name. However, Gage appeared and challenged Page to a rematch between the two, at rSpring Break on April 9. At the event, Page hit a chokebreaker on Gage and then the referee, which allowed Cogar to interfere in the match. While Page and Cogar set up glass panes in the ring, Lauderdale made the save, smashing Cogar in the head with a stack of light tubes. Gage then piledrived Page through the glass, but Page kicked out. Gage quickly hit Page with a chokebreaker for the win, ending his reign at 488 days.

Following his loss to Gage, Page was "demoted" to GCW's sister promotion Jersey Championship Wrestling (JCW), where he started acting like a face and even changed his entrance music to the song he used in CZW ("We Can Roll" by Bad Rabbits). On July 24, at Homecoming Part 1 and during Gage's title match against Matt Cardona, Page came out make the save on Gage, who was being attacked by 44.OH. Page confronted Cogar who slapped him in the face; in response, he and Gage teamed up and beat down on 44.OH, resulting in a double chokebreaker on Cogar and Iron. Page put a stack of light tubes in front of Cardona, setting up Gage for a facewash. The two men shook hands, but as Gage turned away, Page lowblowed him. This allowed Cardona to hit Gage with two stacks of light tubes, followed by his finisher, Radio Silence, for the upset win. The next night saw Page and 44.OH interrupt Gage just as he was about to slice the forehead of Cardona's representative, "Smart" Mark Sterling. Initially outnumbered by 44.OH, Gage quickly received support from Colon, The Second Gear Crew, AJ Gray and Effy. A WarGames match between Team MDK and 44.OH would be announced to take place on September 4 which Team 44.0h! would go on to lose.

=== Major League Wrestling (2022–2024) ===
Page made his debut in the 2022 Battle Riot, eliminating KC Navarro, before being eliminated by Mads Krügger. In late 2022, he would then announce he had been signed to a contract at a Beyond Wrestling show, before being revealed as a member of “The Calling” a stable featuring AKIRA, and Raven during an episode of Underground in January 2023.

On July 8, 2023, Rickey Shane Page as The Calling alongside Akira defeated The Samoan SWAT Team's Lance Anoa'i and Juicy Finau for the MLW World Tag Team Championships at Never Say Never. They lost the titles at Fightland to The Second Gear Crew (Matthew Justice and 1 Called Manders). Shane Page lost the MLW National Openweight Championship to Bad Dude Tito at MLW Azteca Lucha, ending his reign at 252 days. On July 16, 2024, Rickey confirmed on his X account that he had left MLW.

=== Return to Combat Zone Wrestling (2025-present) ===
On February 22, 2025, during the 26th Anniversary show main event between Nick Gage and Alex Colon, Page made his return to Combat Zone Wrestling, saving his former rival Gage from an attack by Colon and Judge Joe Dred. After Gage won the bout, Gage and Page had a stare down as Page left the ring. On May 24, 2025, Page made his in-ring return, defeating Eric Ryan in a deathmatch at CZW Ante Up! Page was announced as the second entrant in Tournament of Death 22. Page and Nick Gage are scheduled to face off at CZW's Prelude to Violence in July 2026.

=== Personal life ===
Page is the co-founder of Beyond Wrestling. Page became a father to a baby girl in February 2025.

== Championships and accomplishments ==
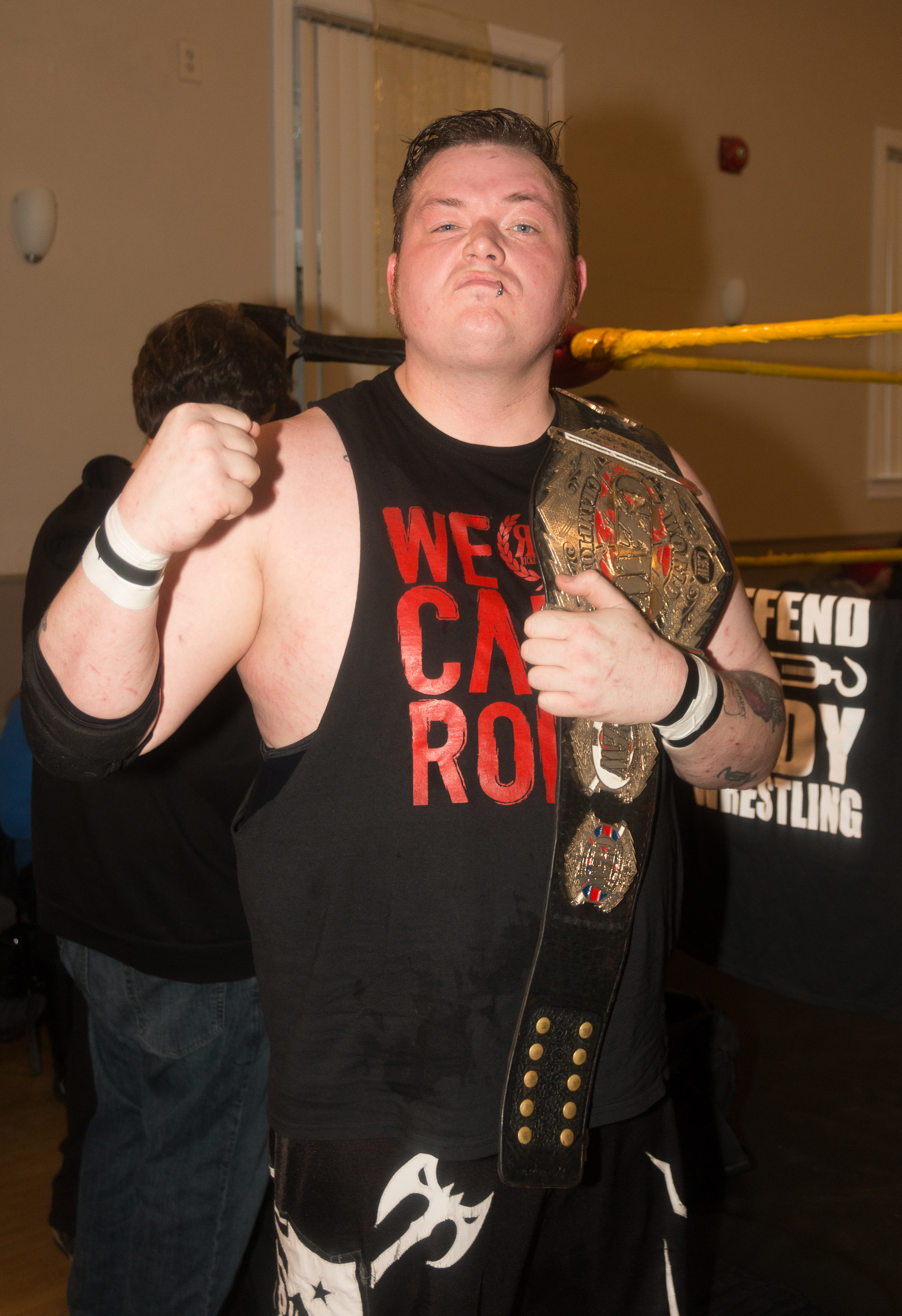
In Combat Zone Wrestling, Page is a former CZW World Heavyweight Champion.

- Absolute Intense Wrestling
  - AIW Absolute Championship (1 time)
  - AIW Tag Team Championship (3 times) – with Vincent Nothing (2), John Thorne (1)
- All American Wrestling
  - AAW Heritage Championship (1 time)
- Alpha-1 Wrestling
  - A1 Alpha Male Championship (2 times)
  - A1 Zero Gravity Championship (1 time)
  - A1 Tag Team Championship (1 time) – with Gregory Iron
  - King Of Hearts (2017)
- Cleveland All-Pro Wrestling
  - CAPW Tag Team Championship (1 time) – with Vincent Nothing
- Ruthless Pro Wrestling
  - RPW Tag Team Championship (1 time) – with Vincent Nothing
- Combat Zone Wrestling
  - CZW World Heavyweight Championship (1 time)
  - CZW Tournament of Death 15
- TNT Extreme Wrestling
  - DOA Tournament (2025)
- Game Changer Wrestling
  - GCW World Championship (1 time)
- H2O Wrestling: Hardcore Hustle Organization
  - H2O Heavyweight Championship (1 time)
- IWA Mid-South
  - IWA Mid-South King of the Deathmatch (2017)
- Insanity Pro Wrestling
  - IPW Tag Team Championship (1 time) – with Vincent Nothing
- Major League Wrestling
  - MLW National Openweight Championship (1 time)
  - MLW World Tag Team Championship (1 time) – with Akira
- Mega Championship Wrestling
  - MCW United States Tag Team Championship (1 time) – with Vincent Nothing
- Ohio Hatchet Wrestling
  - OHW Tag Team Championship (1 time) – with Vincent Nothing
- Pro Wrestling Illustrated
  - Ranked No. 119 of the top 500 singles wrestlers in the PWI 500 in 2024
- The Wrestling Revolver
  - Revolver World Tag Team Championship (2 times) – with Steve Maclin (2), Alex Colon (2), Dark Pledge (1)
- Vicious Outcast Wrestling
  - VOW Anarchy Championship (1 time)
