= St. Petersburg Coliseum =

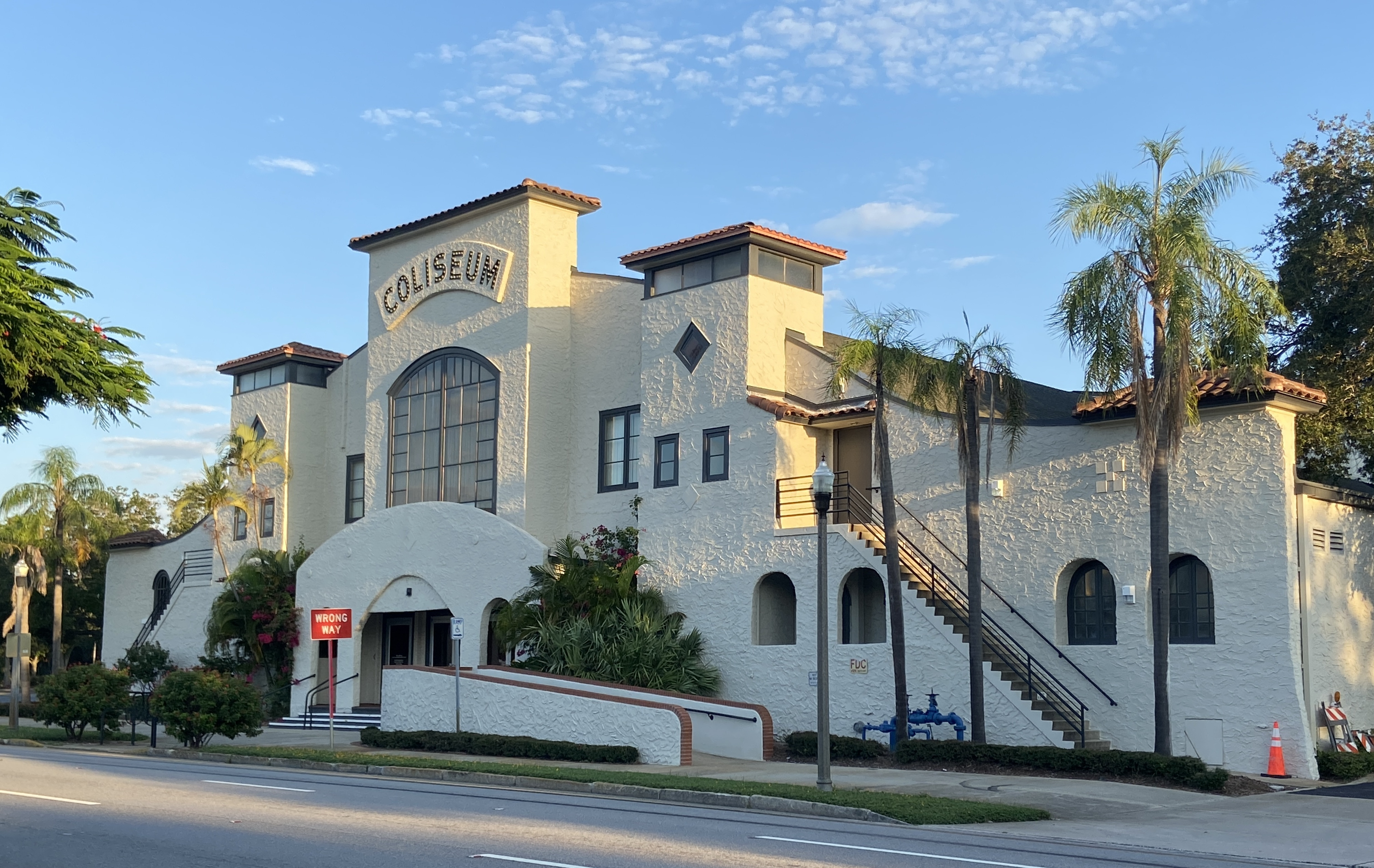
- Interactive map of St. Petersburg Coliseum
- Address: 535 4th Ave N
- Location: St. Petersburg, Florida
- Coordinates: 27°46′36.3936″N 82°38′27.9636″W
- Owner: City of St. Petersburg

Construction
- Opened: November 20, 1924
- Architect: T.H. Eslick

Website
- Official website

The St. Petersburg Coliseum, also known as The Coliseum, is an events venue located in St. Petersburg, Florida. The venue opened on November 20, 1924, and designed by T.H. Eslick.

During its early years, the venue was originally used as a dancehall and was advertised as the “Best Ballroom in the South” and a “Palace of Pleasures”. In 1989, the city of St. Petersburg purchased the venue for $824,500 and closed the building to undergo a $1 million renovation which included upgrades to the air conditioning system, an exterior paint job, interior changes, electrical system upgrades, and a fire-sprinkler system. The venue reopened in October of the same year. In 1994, the venue was registered in the St. Petersburg Registry of Historic Places as a historic landmark.
