= Ikuro Kwon =

Korean-American professional wrestler

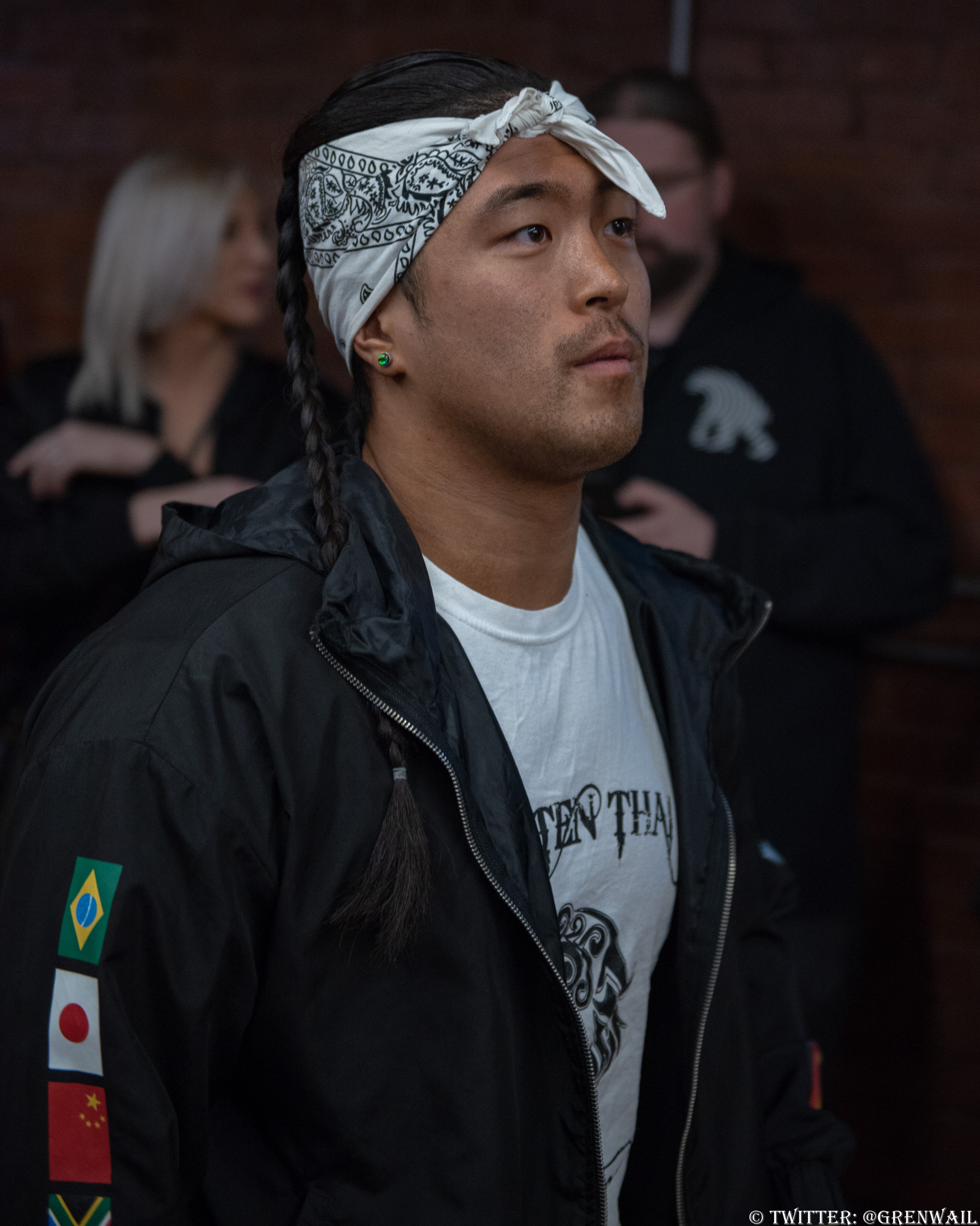
- Kwon in March 2019

Personal information
- Born: Seoul, South Korea

Professional wrestling career
- Ring names: Ikuro Kwon; Tristen Thai
- Billed height: 5 ft 9 in (175 cm)
- Billed weight: 180 lb (82 kg)
- Trained by: Cono Cappuccia; Grim Reefer
- Debut: September 9, 2017

Tristen Thai is a South Korean-born American professional wrestler. He is signed to Major League Wrestling (MLW), where he performs under the ring name Ikuro Kwon and is a member of Contra Unit. He also makes appearances on the independent circuit and Consejo Mundial de Lucha Libre (CMLL) due to the organizations' partnership with MLW.

== Professional wrestling career ==
=== American independent circuit (2017–present) ===
Thai began his wrestling career in September 2017. He also wrestled in Combat Zone Wrestling (CZW) from 2018 to 2019. It was around this time that he formed a tag team with Gabriel Skye dubbed Above the Rest. The duo went on to win the Remarkable Tag Team Championship in November 2023.

=== Major League Wrestling (2019–2022) ===
Kwon was introduced by Contra Unit as their fourth member on the August 3 episode of Fusion, who spit mist into Marshall Von Erich's eyes. He took part in the titular match at War Chamber, where his stable would lose to Low Ki, Tom Lawlor and Marshall and Ross Von Erich to settle the rivalry. Kwon then took part in Contra Unit's feud with Salina de la Renta's stable Promociones Dorado and later The Hart Foundation. He remained with the stable until it the latter would seemingly dissolve at War Chamber after losing the titular match to the Hammerheads. This was also heavily implied to be the case by MLW's YouTube channel, which stated Kwon had renounced Contra and left. This would be ignored, however in future episodes of Fusion, which would have Kwon providing backup for Krügger, both men having Contra logos in their entrance videos and commentators referring to Contra in the present tense along with referencing Krügger and Kwon looking for new members.

=== Return to MLW (2024–present) ===
At War Chamber on March 29, 2024, Kwon returned to MLW and assisted Contra Unit in attacking The Second Gear Crew (Matthew Justice and 1 Called Manders) and CozyMax (Shigeo Okumura and Satoshi Kojima). On June 1, 2024, at Battle Riot VI, Suzuki joined the Contra Unit teaming with Mads Krule Krügger and Kwon to defeat Kojima, Matt Riddle, and Akira in a six-man tag team match. Suzuki and Kwon would then defeat CozyMax to win the MLW World Tag Team Championships at Summer of the Beasts on August 29. On October 31, 2024, Fightful reported that Kwon had signed a contract with MLW.

== Championships and accomplishments ==
- Expect The Unexpected
  - ETU Key To The East Championship (1 time, current)
- Major League Wrestling
  - MLW World Tag Team Championship (1 time) – with Minoru Suzuki
- Pro Wrestling Illustrated
  - Ranked No. 356 of the top singles wrestlers in the PWI 500 in 2026
- Remarkable Wrestling
  - Remarkable Riot Championship (2 times)
  - Remarkable Tag Team Championship (1 time) – with Gabriel Skye
