= MLW World Middleweight Championship =

Professional wrestling championship

- The MLW World Middleweight Championship belt

Details
- Promotion: Major League Wrestling (MLW)
- Date established: June 28, 2018
- Current champion: Templario
- Date won: May 1, 2026
Statistics
- First champion: Maxwell Jacob Friedman
- Most reigns: Myron Reed (3 reigns)
- Longest reign: Myron Reed (424 days)
- Shortest reign: Shun Skywalker (42 days)
- Oldest champion: Tajiri (51 years, 23 days)
- Youngest champion: Maxwell Jacob Friedman (22 years, 126 days)
- Heaviest champion: Maxwell Jacob Friedman (216 lb (98 kg))
- Lightest champion: Myron Reed (154 lb (70 kg))

The MLW World Middleweight Championship is a professional wrestling championship created and promoted by the American professional wrestling promotion Major League Wrestling (MLW). The title was unveiled on July 18, 2018, it is contested in MLW's middleweight division by wrestlers at a maximum weight of 205 lb (93 kg). The current champion is Templario, who is in his second reign. He won the title by defeating Kushida at CMLL Viernes Espectacular: CMLL vs. MLW in Mexico City, Mexico on May 1, 2026.

== History ==
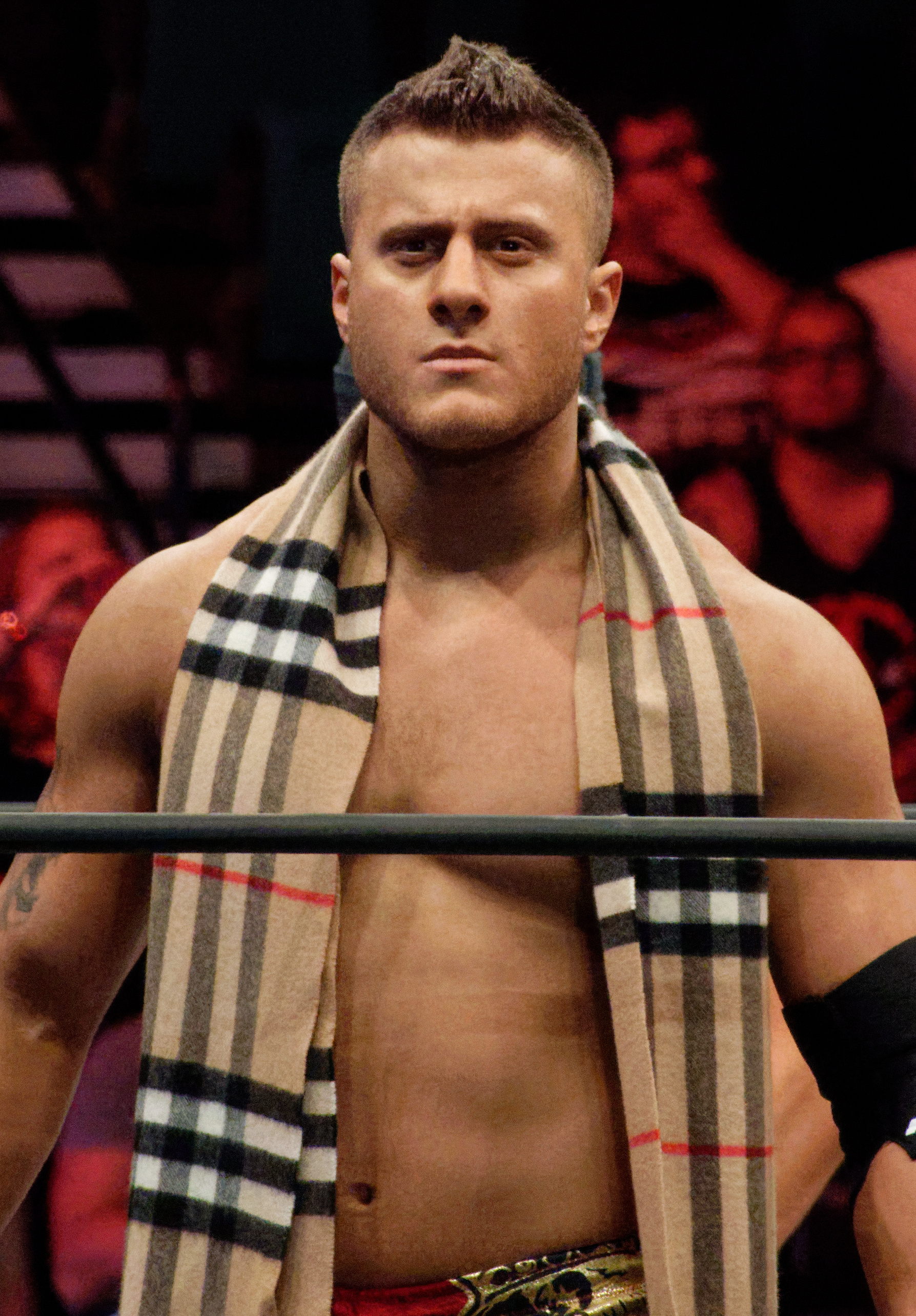
Inaugural champion Maxwell Jacob Friedman.

On June 28, 2018, Major League Wrestling (MLW) announced the creation of the MLW World Middleweight Championship, for their middleweight division instead of the "cruiserweight" division, which is more common in American professional wrestling. It was announced that the title holds a weight limit of 205 lb (93 kg). Also announced was an singles match between Maxwell Jacob Friedman and Joey Ryan to crown the first champion. The title match was later advertised on July 6 during episode 12 of MLW Fusion. The title was unveiled on July 18. The following day, Maxwell Jacob Friedman defeated Joey Ryan to become the inaugural MLW World Middleweight Championship (air date July 27, 2018). The title would be vacated on December 7, after Friedman was sidelined with an elbow injury. Teddy Hart would defeat El Hijo de L.A. Park, Dezmond Xavier, Gringo Loco and Kotto Brazil in a five-way ladder match on December 14 at MLW Fusion Live to win the title.

== Reigns ==
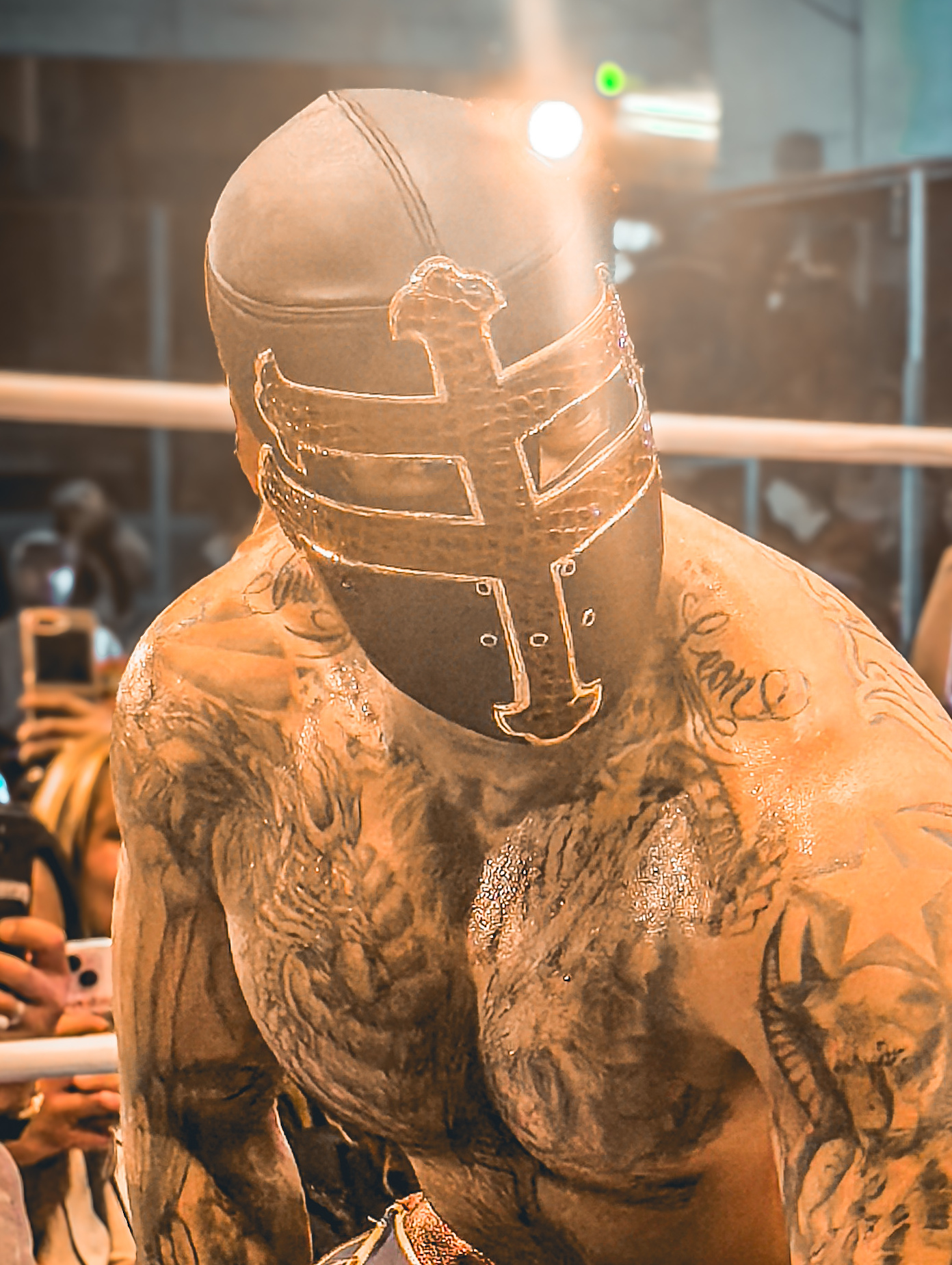
Two-time and current champion Templario

Key
| No. | Overall reign number |
| Reign | Reign number for the specific champion |
| Days | Number of days held |
| + | Current reign is changing daily |

| No. | Champion | Championship change | | | Reign statistics | | Notes | Ref. |
| No. | Champion | Date | Event | Location | Reign | Days | Notes | Ref. |
|---|---|---|---|---|---|---|---|---|
Major League Wrestling (MLW)
| 1 | Maxwell Jacob Friedman | July 19, 2018 | Battle Riot I | New York City, New York | 1 | 141 | Friedman defeated Joey Ryan to become the inaugural champion. The episode aired on tape delay on July 27, 2018. | |
| — | Vacated | December 7, 2018 | — | — | — | — | Friedman vacated the championship after an elbow injury. | |
| 2 | Teddy Hart | December 14, 2018 | Fusion Live | Miami, Florida | 1 | 330 | Hart defeated Dezmond Xavier, El Hijo de L.A. Park, Gringo Loco and Kotto Brazil in a five-way ladder match to win the vacant championship. | |
| 3 | Myron Reed | November 9, 2019 | Blood and Thunder | Orlando, Florida | 1 | 424 | Aired on the November 9 episode of Fusion via tape delay. | |
| 4 | Lio Rush | January 6, 2021 | Kings of Colosseum | Orlando, Florida | 1 | 119 | | |
| 5 | Myron Reed | May 5, 2021 | Fusion Live | Orlando, Florida | 2 | 150 | | |
| 6 | Tajiri | October 2, 2021 | Fightland | Philadelphia, Pennsylvania | 1 | 111 | This was a four-way match also involving Aramis and Arez. | |
| 7 | Myron Reed | January 21, 2022 | Blood and Thunder | North Richland Hills, Texas | 3 | 240 | This was a four-way match also including Bandido and Matt Cross. | |
| 8 | Shun Skywalker | September 18, 2022 | Super Series | Norcross, Georgia | 1 | 42 | | |
| 9 | Lince Dorado | October 30, 2022 | Fightland | Philadelphia, Pennsylvania | 1 | 158 | | |
| 10 | Akira | April 6, 2023 | War Chamber | Queens, New York City, New York | 1 | 191 | This was a Three-way match also including Lio Rush. | |
| 11 | Rocky Romero | October 14, 2023 | Slaughterhouse | Philadelphia, Pennsylvania | 1 | 138 | This was a Winner Takes All match, with Romero's NWA World Historic Welterweight Championship also on the line. | |
| 12 | Místico | February 29, 2024 | Intimidation Games | New York City, New York | 1 | 401 | | |
| — | Vacated | April 5, 2025 | — | — | — | — | Místico vacated the championship after announcing his intention to move up to the heavyweight division. | |
| 13 | Templario | September 13, 2025 | Fightland | North Richland Hills, Texas | 1 | 138 | Defeated Ikuro Kwon to win the vacant title. | |
| 14 | Kushida | January 29, 2026 | Battle Riot VIII | Kissimmee, FL | 1 | 92 | Aired on tape delay on February 5, 2026. | |
| 15 | Templario | May 1, 2026 | CMLL Viernes Espectacular: CMLL vs. MLW | Mexico City, Mexico | 2 | 194+ | | |

== Combined reigns ==
As of November 11, 2026.

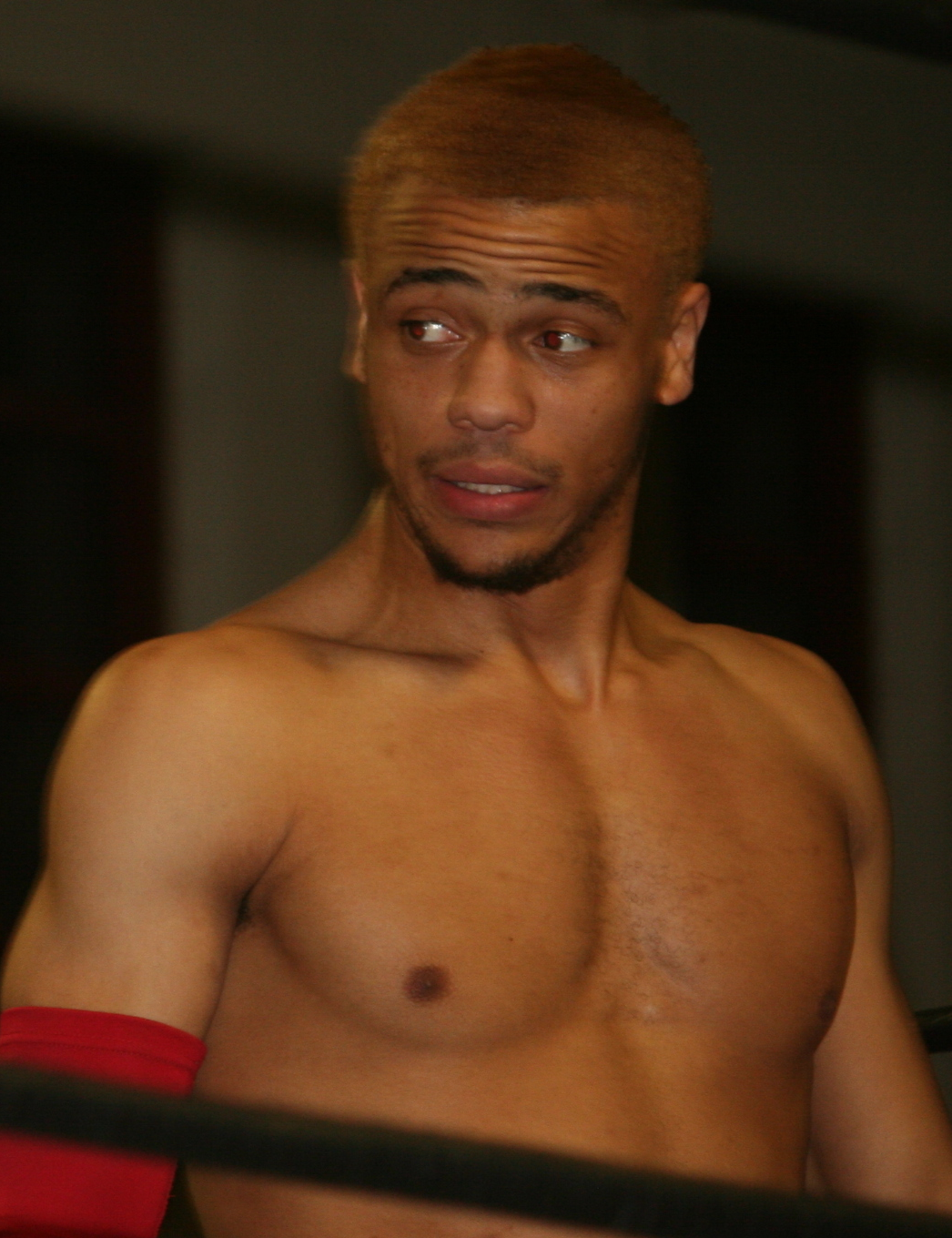
Record-setting three-time and most combined days as MLW World Middleweight champion at 814, Myron Reed.

| † | Indicates the current champions |

| Rank | Wrestler | No. of reigns | Combined days |
|---|---|---|---|
| 1 | Myron Reed | 3 | 814 |
| 2 | Místico | 1 | 401 |
| 3 | Templario † | 2 | 332+ |
| 4 | Teddy Hart | 1 | 330 |
| 5 | Akira | 1 | 191 |
| 6 | Lince Dorado | 1 | 158 |
| 7 | Maxwell Jacob Friedman | 1 | 141 |
| 8 | Rocky Romero | 1 | 138 |
| 9 | Lio Rush | 1 | 119 |
| 10 | Tajiri | 1 | 111 |
| 11 | Kushida | 1 | 92 |
| 12 | Shun Skywalker | 1 | 42 |
