= Janai Kai =

American professional wrestler (born 1994)

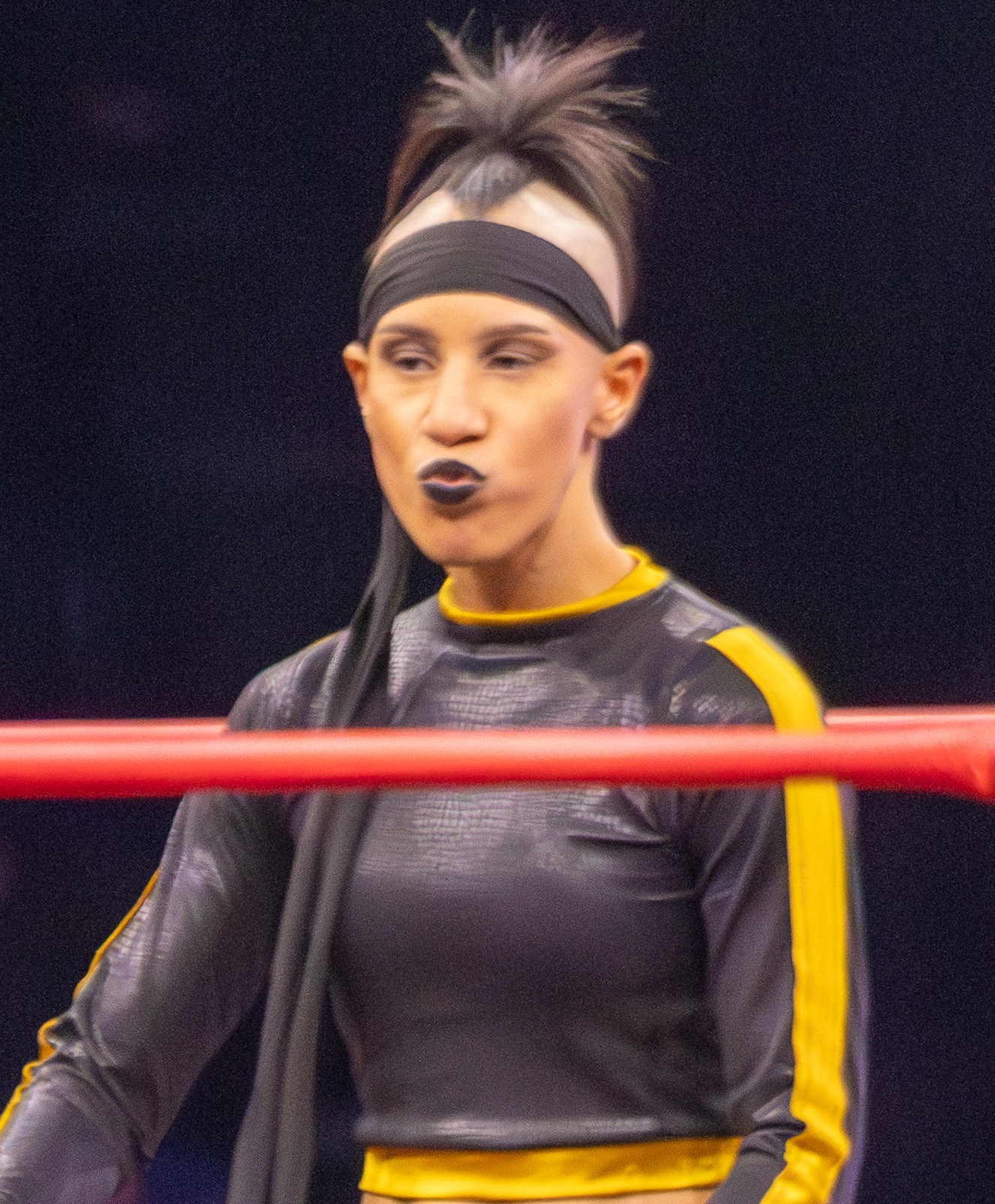
- Kai at Supercard of Honor 2026

Personal information
- Born: Janai Ruiz; September 25, 1994 (age 31) Washington, D.C., United States

Professional wrestling career
- Ring name(s): Gaia Terra; Janai Kai
- Billed height: 1.68 m (5 ft 6 in)
- Billed weight: 57 kg (126 lb)
- Trained by: Mecha Wolf 450; Santana Garrett; Thunder Rosa
- Debut: 2018

Janai Ruiz (born September 25, 1994) is an American professional wrestler. She was previously signed to Major League Wrestling (MLW), where she performed under the ring name Janai Kai and was a member of Contra Unit. She is also a former one-time and longest reigning MLW World Women's Featherweight Champion. She is best known for her tenure with the professional wrestling promotion Game Changer Wrestling and various others from the American independent scene.

== Professional wrestling career ==
=== American independent circuit (2018–present) ===
Ruiz made her professional wrestling debut in Pro Wrestling 2.0, at a house show named PW2.0 And Justice For All which took place on July 3, 2018, where she teamed up with her "Diamond Dynasty" teammates Robyn Reid and Salem, and Sofia Castillo in a losing effort to The Dream Team (Gabrielle Arce, Lacey Lane, Santana Garrett and Tessa Blanchard). In Ring of Honor, she made her first appearance at ROH Women's Division Wednesday #32 on December 1, 2021, where she fell short to Trish Adora. Ruiz made her first AEW appearance at AEW Dynamite #17 on December 3, 2021, where she fell short to Jade Cargill. At Warrior Wrestling 22, an event promoted by Warrior Wrestling on May 28, 2022, she unsuccessfully challenged Athena for the Warrior Wrestling Women's Championship. At Major League Wrestling's MLW Slaughterhouse event from October 14, 2023, Ruiz defeated Delmi Exo to win the MLW World Women's Featherweight Championship.

==== Game Changer Wrestling (2021–present) ====
Ruiz competed in one of Game Changer Wrestling's signature events, the GCW Bloodsport, in which she made her debut in GCW Josh Barnett's Bloodsport 6 on April 8, 2021, where she fell short to Karen Tran in singles competition. At Barnett's Bloodsport 8 on March 31, 2022, Ruiz fell short to Masha Slamovich.

She also worked in other events promoted by the company. At The Wrld on GCW on January 23, 2022, she competed in a 20-person Pabst Blue Ribbon kickoff battle royal won by Big Vin and also involving notable opponents such as Psycho Clown, Ruckus, B-Boy, Lufisto, Dark Sheik and Thunder Rosa. In the second part of the sixth Joey Janela's Spring Break event, she competed in the signature Clusterfuck Battle Royal, bout won by The Second Gear Crew (AJ Gray, Mance Warner and Matthew Justice) which also involved notable opponents such as Billie Starkz, Blake Christian, Jimmy Wang Yang, Maven, Edith Surreal and many others. Another signature pay-per-view she competed in is the GCW Cage Of Survival, making her first appearance at the second edition from June 4, 2023, where she fell short to Maki Itoh. At JCW Big Ass Extreme Birthday Bash on July 9, 2023, she unsuccessfully faced Utami Hayashishita in singles competition.

=== Japanese independent circuit (2023–present) ===
==== Gleat (2023) ====
Ruiz made her debut in the Japanese promotion Gleat at GLEAT Ver. 6 ~ 2nd Anniversary on July 1, 2023, where she teamed up with Aoi, Michiko Miyagi and Risa Sera to defeat Itsuki Aoki, Rydeen Hagane, Unagi Sayaka and Yukari Hosokawa. One month later, it was revealed that Ruiz alongside Aoi, Miyagi and Sera formed the "Diamond Egoist" villainous stable and had their first match as a group at GLEAT Ver. Mega on August 4, 2023, where they fell short to Dash Chisako, Kyoko Inoue, Unagi Sayaka and Yukari Hosokawa in an eight-woman tag team match. At GLEAT G PROWRESTLING Ver. 60 ~ Max Voltage on September 20, 2023, she teamed up with stablemate Miyagi and Hiragi Kurumi in a losing effort against Kairi, Nanae Takahashi and Yukari Hosokawa.

==== Tokyo Joshi Pro-Wrestling (2023) ====
Ruiz made her first appearance in Tokyo Joshi Pro-Wrestling on the finals night of the 2023 Max Heart Tournament from February 11, where she teamed up with Hikari Noa to defeat Yuki Arai and Rika Tatsumi. She briefly moved to title scene at TJPW City Circuit Winter ~ Nagoya Performance on February 18, where she unsuccessfully challenged Miu Watanabe for the International Princess Championship.

=== Major League Wrestling (2023–2025) ===
On October 14, 2023, at MLW Slaughterhouse Janai Kai defeated Delmi Exo via submission to become the MLW World Women's Featherweight Championship holder. On May 18, 2024, at MLW Fury Road Janai Kai was revealed as the newest member of Contra Unit. On May 19, 2025 Kai announced her departure from MLW.

== Championships and accomplishments ==
- Combat Fights Unlimited
  - Shoot To Thrill Tournament (2021)
- TitleMatchNetwork.com
  - Ladies Night Out Championship (1 time)
- Major League Wrestling
  - MLW World Women's Featherweight Championship (1 time)
- Pro Wrestling Illustrated
  - Ranked No. 468 of the top 500 singles wrestlers in the PWI 500 of 2021
  - Ranked No. 37 of the top 250 female wrestlers in the PWI Women's 250 in 2024
- REAL Pro Wrestling
  - RPW Women's Championship (1 time)
