= Bad Dude Tito =

American professional wrestler (born 1983)

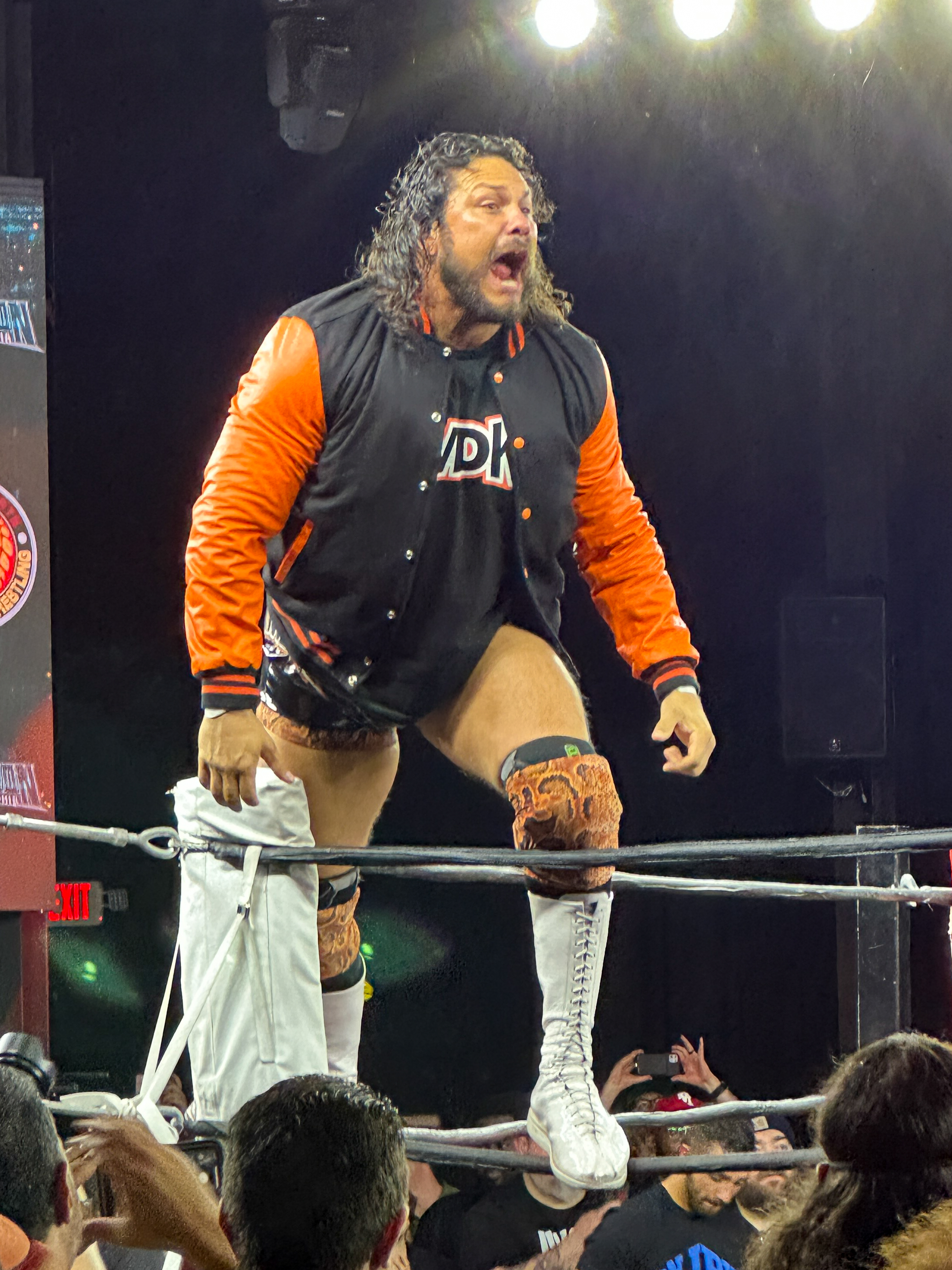
- Escondido in 2023

Personal information
- Born: October 4, 1983 (age 43) Whittier, California

Professional wrestling career
- Ring names: Bad Dude Tito; Papacito Negro; Tito Escondido
- Billed height: 6 ft 1 in (1.85 m)
- Billed weight: 230 lb (100 kg)
- Billed from: Los Angeles, California, U.S.
- Trained by: Santino Bros. Wrestling Academy
- Debut: 2011

Tito Escondido (born October 4, 1983), better known by his ring name Bad Dude Tito, is an American professional wrestler. He currently performs as a freelancer as a member of The Mighty Don't Kneel (TMDK).

== Professional wrestling career ==
=== New Japan Pro-Wrestling (2021–present) ===
On the January 22, 2022 episode of NJPW Strong, Tito made his NJPW debut where he lost to Juice Robinson. On the February 12 episode of NJPW Strong, he teamed up with Jonah where they lost to FinJuice (David Finlay and Juice Robinson). On the March 6, episode of NJPW Strong, Shane Haste interfered in the tag team match between FinJuice and the pairing of Jonah and Tito. He attacked Robinson while the referee was distracted, allowing Tito to hit a frog splash on Robinson for the win, reforming TMDK in the process. At Windy City Riot, TMDK and Tito were defeated by FinJuice and their partner, revealed to be Brody King. On May 14, at Capital Collision, TMDK and Tito defeated the United Empire, with Mikey Nicholls pinning Kyle Fletcher for the win. After the match, Tito, who had been tagging with Jonah since the start of the year, officially joined TMDK.

On June 20, Jonah was announced as being part of G1 Climax 32. Tito accompanied Jonah, with both wrestlers being used in undercard tag team matches throughout the tournament.

=== Impact Wrestling (2023) ===
At Sacrifice, as part of a partnership between Impact Wrestling and NJPW, Haste and Tito faced Impact World Tag Team Champions Bullet Club (Ace Austin and Chris Bey) in a losing effort. They lost to Bullet Club again at Multiverse United in a four-way tag team match which also involved Aussie Open (Kyle Fletcher and Mark Davis) and the Motor City Machine Guns (Alex Shelley and Chris Sabin).

=== Major League Wrestling (2024) ===
During The Burning Crush, which aired on February 17, 2024, it was announced that Tito would face Matt Riddle at Intimidation Games. At the event on February 29, Tito was unsuccessful at winning the NJPW World Television Championship against Riddle. On April 20 at War Chamber II, Tito (accompanied by Salina de la Renta) unsuccessfully challenged Satoshi Kojima for the MLW World Heavyweight Championship. On May 11 at MLW Azteca Lucha, Tito defeated Rickey Shane Page to win the MLW National Openweight Championship. On June 22 at Anniversary '24, Tito made his first title defence, defeating Jake Crist. On November 9 at Lucha Apocalypto, Tito was defeated by Matthew Justice in a falls count anywhere match, ending his reign at 182 days.

=== Consejo Mundial de Lucha Libre (2024) ===
It was announced on May 1, 2024 on CMLL Informa that Tito and Che Cabrera (Wolf Zaddies) were the first participants of FantasticaMania México 2024 and subsequently began a tour. At the event on June 21, Tito and Cabrera were defeated by Los Depredadores (Magnus and Rugido).

== Championships and accomplishments ==
- Alternative Wrestling Show
  - AWS Heavyweight Championship (1 time)
  - AWS Tag Team Championship (2 times) – with Rico Dynamite (1) and Che Cabrera (1)
- Alpha Omega Wrestling
  - AOW Heavyweight Championship (1 time)
  - AOW Tag Team Championship (2 times) – with Rico Dynamite (1) and The Red-Headed Stepchild (1)
- Rival Pro Wrestling
  - Rival Pro Championship (1 time, current)
- Championship Wrestling from Hollywood
  - CWFH Heritage Heavyweight Championship (1 time)
  - CWFH Heritage Tag Team Championship (1 time) – with Rico Dynamite
  - Red Carpet Rumble (2016)
- Empire Wrestling Federation
  - EWF Tag Team Championship (1 time) – with Che Cabrera
- Pro Wrestling Illustrated
  - Ranked No. 284 of the top 500 singles wrestlers in the PWI 500 in 2024
- Major League Wrestling
  - MLW National Openweight Championship (1 time)
- Finest City Wrestling
  - FCW Heavyweight Championship (1 time)
- Santino Bros. Wrestling
  - SBW Submission Championship (1 time)
  - SBW Tag Team Championship (1 time, inaugural)–with Che Cabrera
  - SBW Tag Team Title Tournament (2024) – Che Cabrera
- FIST COMBAT
  - FIST Tag Team Championship (1 time)– with Che Cabrera
- SoCal Pro Wrestling
  - SCP Tag Team Championship (1 time) – with Che Cabrera
- United Wrestling Network
  - UWN Tag Team Championship (1 time) – with Shane Haste
