= Akira (American wrestler) =

American professional wrestler

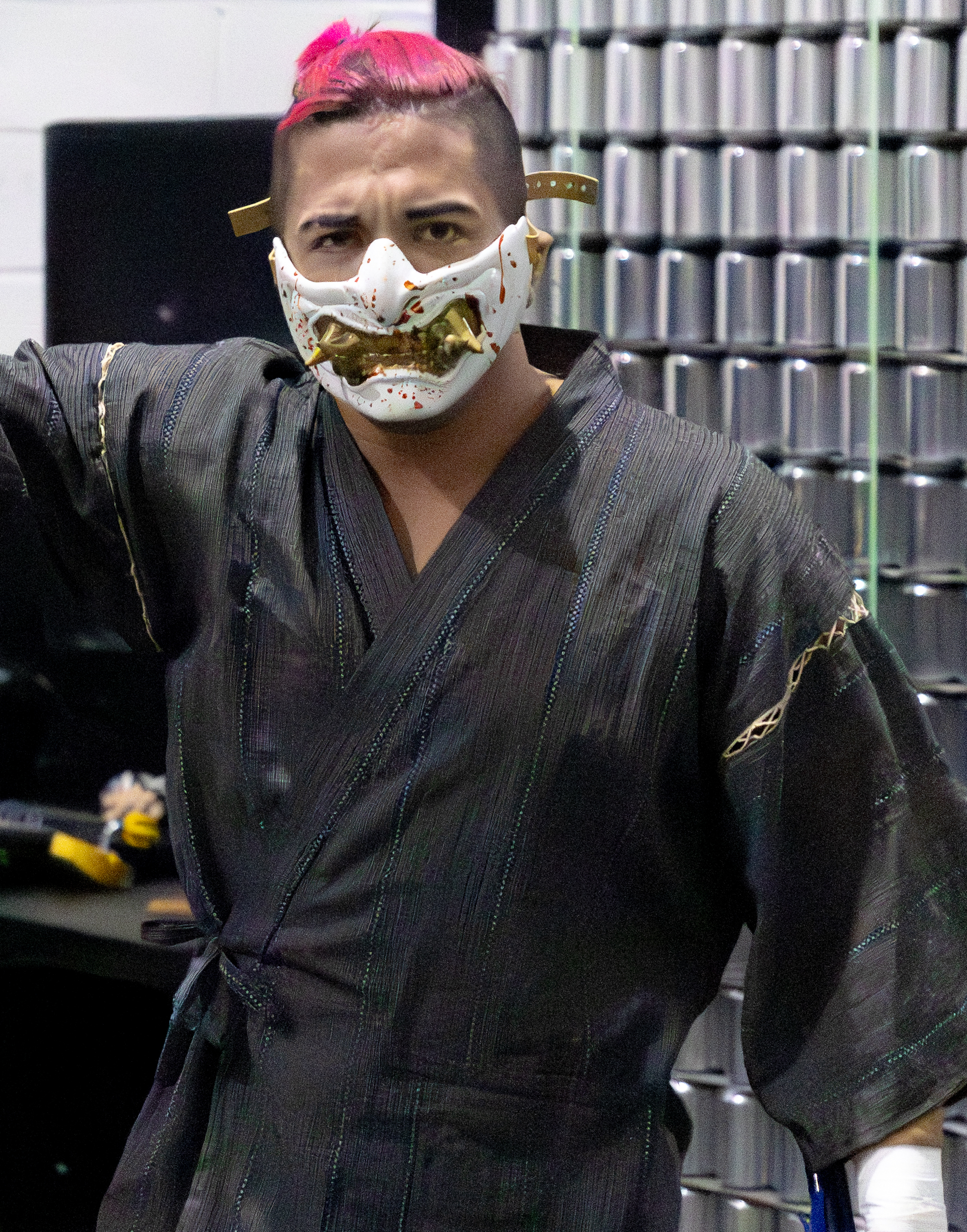
- Akira in November 2025

Personal information
- Born: Alexander James Atkisson; October 19, 1993 (age 33) Bringhurst, Indiana

Professional wrestling career
- Ring names: Akira; Akira Tsurugi; Akira Way; Great Akira; MaidKira
- Billed height: 5 ft 11 in (1.80 m)
- Billed weight: 190 lb (86 kg)
- Trained by: John Wayne Murdoch; Reed Bentley; Blake Reed
- Debut: January 4, 2018

Alexander James Atkisson (born October 19, 1993), known by his ring name Akira (stylised in all caps), is an American professional wrestler. He is currently performing as a freelancer – predominantly for Big Japan Pro Wrestling (BJW), where he is a former one-time BJW Deathmatch Heavyweight Champion. He is best known for his time in Major League Wrestling (MLW), where he is a former MLW World Tag Team Champion and a former MLW World Middleweight Champion.

== Professional wrestling career ==
=== Game Changer Wrestling (2021–present) ===
On October 9, 2021, at GCW Fight Club, Akira teamed up with Alex Colon and G-Raver and faced The Second Gear Crew (AJ Gray, Mance Warner and Matthew Justice) in a losing effort. On May 1, 2022, at GCW Life Goes On, he and John Wayne Murdoch faced Allie Katch and Effy for the GCW Tag Team Championship but lost. On June 5, at Cage of Survival, Akira competed in the Seven Way Scramble match for the AJ Gray's GCW Extreme Championship, the latter in whom successfully defended the title. On July 10, at Settlement Series Part 1, Akira would win his first match in GCW when he defeated Janai Kai.

On September 5, 2026, at Tournament of Death, Akira defeated Eran Ashe for the CZW World Heavyweight Championship in an exploding barbed wire match to begin his second reign as the champion.

=== Major League Wrestling (2023–2025) ===
On January 14, 2023, Akira signed a contract with Major League Wrestling. In the weeks that followed, various members of the MLW roster would be mysteriously assaulted in the backstage area, with the only sign of the attacker(s) being a calling card with the initials "AO." On the February 28 episode of MLW Underground Wrestling, the mysterious attackers would make their first in-person appearance, attacking Lince Dorado, Microman, and Mister Saint Laurent. The following week, a video package aired revealing Akira as one of the attackers, as part of The Calling, a stable which include leader Raven and Rickey Shane Page. On the March 21 episode of Underground Wrestling, after MLW World Heavyweight Champion Alexander Hammerstone successfully defended his title against Jacob Fatu, The Calling attacked Hammerstone in which Akira took part. On the March 28 episode of Underground Wrestling, Akira made his MLW in-ring debut, defeating Mike Law in a hardcore match.

At War Chamber, Akira defeated Dorado and Lio Rush to win the MLW World Middleweight Championship in a triple threat match. He also took part in the War Chamber match as part of The Calling who defeated Hammerstone and The Second Gear Crew. On July 8, at Never Say Never, Akira and Page defeated The Samoan SWAT Team (Lance Anoa'i and Juicy Finau) to win the MLW World Tag Team Championship. On October 14, at Slaughterhouse, After lost the middleweight title to NWA World Historic Welterweight Champion Rocky Romero, after which he began to butt heads with Page.

Still feuding with the Second Gear Crew, the SGC's Matthew Justice and 1 Called Manders challenged Akira and Page for the MLW World Tag Team Championship in a tables match. However, that ended in a no contest when Justice and Akira went through a stack of tables at the same time. The two teams continued to brawl afterward, with Mance Warner and The Calling's minions joining in. The SGC challenged Akira and Page to a ladder match for the titles at Fightland, which was accepted and made official by MLW on November 6. On that event, with tensions mounting between Akira and Page, they lost the World Tag Team Championship to the SGC. After the match, Page and the rest of The Calling attacked Akira, kicking him out of the group. On the season finale of Fusion, Akira challenged Page for the latter's MLW National Openweight Championship, but quickly lost the match, after which he was attacked by The Calling in a post-match assault.

On January 6, 2024, Akira faced Page for the National Openweight Championship once again, this time in a Taipei Deathmatch, but lost the match when Sami Callihan interfered, leading to a feud with the latter.

On June 16, 2025, Akira announced that he was officially a free agent.

=== Combat Zone Wrestling (2026–present) ===
On June 27, 2026, he defeated Eran Ashe at CZW Tangled Web to capture the CZW World Heavyweight Championship. After dropping the title back to Ashe 2 weeks later, AKIRA defeated him yet again in an Exploding Barbed Wire Death Match at Tournament of Death XXIII to regain the title on September 5, 2026.

== Personal life ==
On September 23, 2025, Akira's former partner, TNA wrestler Masha Slamovich, was accused of domestic violence against him after his friend posted alleged texts and photos that showcased Slamovich verbally, physically, and emotionally abusing Akira. Slamovich issued a statement where she apologized for her actions and was pulled from various shows by multiple promotions.

He is part of the LGBTQ community as listed by Outsports.

Akira streams on Twitch under the username TheAkiraWay. He is a vocal fan of Final Fantasy games and Godzilla Films.

== Championships and accomplishments ==
- Asylum Wrestling Revolution
  - AWR Revolutionary Championship (1 time)
  - Asylum Deathmatch Tournament (2021)
- Big Japan Pro Wrestling
  - BJW Deathmatch Heavyweight Championship (1 time)
  - King of Deathmatch World GP (2024)
- Circle 6
  - Sicest of The Six (2023)
- Combat Zone Wrestling
  - CZW World Heavyweight Championship (2 times, current)
- Fédération Montérégienne de Lutte
  - FML FrissonsTV Championship (1 time, inaugural)
  - FML FrissonsTV Title Tournament (2022)
- Girl Fight Wrestling
  - Tag Team Tournament (2019) – with Charlie Kruel
- IWA Deep South
  - Shoot Style Tournament (2020)
- IWA East Coast
  - Masters of Pain (2021)
- Major League Wrestling
  - MLW World Middleweight Championship (1 time)
  - MLW World Tag Team Championship (1 time) – with Rickey Shane Page
- Northern Federation of Wrestling
  - NFW Championship (1 time, inaugural)
  - NFW Title Tournament (2022)
- Paradigm Pro Wrestling
  - PPW Heavy Hitters Championship (1 time)
- Primos Premier Pro Wrestling
  - Slave to the Deathmatch (2024)
- Pro Wrestling Illustrated
  - Ranked No. 129 of the top 500 singles wrestlers in the PWI 500 in 2023
