= Matthew Justice =

American professional wrestler (born 1988)

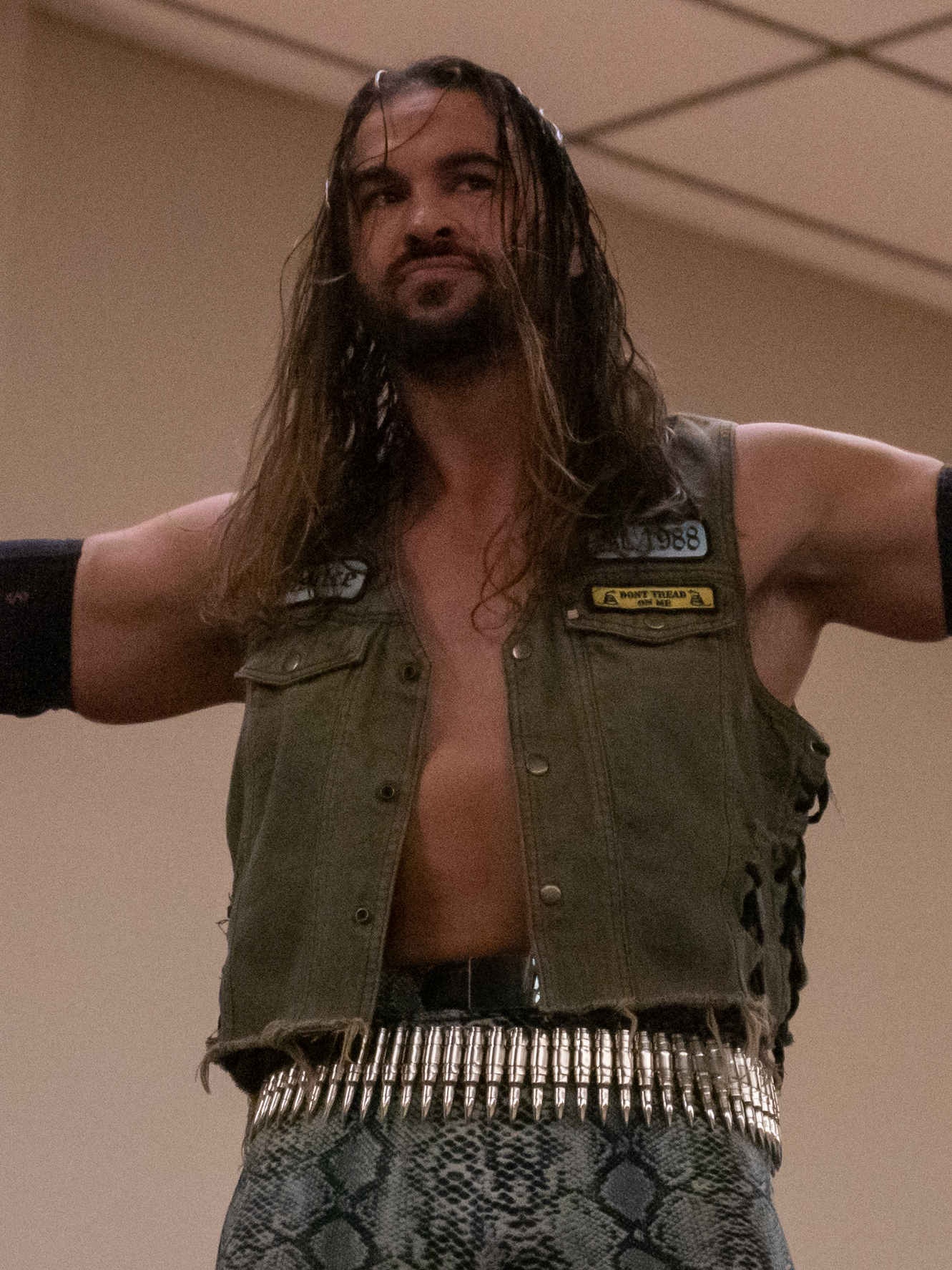
- Justice in October 2019

Personal information
- Born: Matthew Hannan; March 23, 1988 (age 38) Middlefield, Ohio, U.S.

Professional wrestling career
- Ring name(s): Mack Hetfield; Matthew Justice; Matt Justice; Matthew Busch; Mike Stevens
- Billed height: 6 ft 1 in (1.85 m)
- Billed weight: 221 lb (100 kg)
- Billed from: Venice Beach, California
- Trained by: J.T. Lightning
- Debut: 2006

Matthew Hannan (born March 23, 1988) is an American professional wrestler, primarily performing on the independent circuit and for Major League Wrestling (MLW), where he is former one-time MLW World Tag Team Champion (with 1 Called Manders), under the ring name Matthew Justice. He is also former one-time MLW National Openweight Champion.

== Early life ==
Hannan grew up in Streetsboro, Ohio. As a child, he enjoyed watching professional wrestling. His father, Tom Hannan, was the coach for the football team at Crestwood High School, but Justice was not interested in sports. He would play in local bands, but was looking for a different calling.

== Professional wrestling career ==
During his junior and senior years of high school, Hannan began professional wrestling when he found out about a training school in Cleveland run by a local veteran of the ring, J.T. Lightning. The school was about 25 miles from where Hannan lived so he started going there a few days a week.

His ring name, Matthew Justice, originated from his first name and "Justice" from Hannan's love for the heavy metal band Metallica's album ...And Justice for All. The nickname "One Man Militia" came from Hannan's friend and lifting partner.

He would perform in shows throughout Northeast Ohio. He would later graduate from Streetsboro High School in 2007.

He notes wrestler Rob Van Dam as an idol and the main reason that he became a wrestler.

=== Pro Wrestling Ohio / Prime Wrestling (2007–present) ===
Hannan debuted in Pro Wrestling Ohio in an interview segment. He soon teamed with Charles "White Socks" Johnson under the team name "Socks of Justice". The two defeated the team of Brian Bender and Ernie Ballz (The Clash). Later, Johnson was assaulted backstage by Bender and Ballz having Justice duel against both competitors unsuccessfully in a 2-on-1 handicap match. Johnson returned a week later as Socks of Justice defeated The Clash in a tag team match. Socks of Justice disbanded for Justice defeated Jimmy DeMarco on his own.

Eventually, Justice formed another tag team with Morty Rackem, calling themselves "Pirate Justice". The team defeated The Clash and V-Squared (Virus and Virus Grande) on multiple occasions. At the first annual Wrestlelution, Pirate Justice unsuccessfully became the first ever PWO Tag Team Champions against Jake Crist and Vincent Nothing and V-Squared. A few weeks later, Justice defeated Benjamin Boone and unsuccessfully faced against Michael Montecarlo.

Going into 2009, Justice was defeated by Bill Collier, Super Hentai, and Benjamin Boone. Pirate Justice later lost to the team of Greg Valentine and Jim Neidhart for the PWO Tag Team Titles. At Wrestlelution 2, Justice defeated Rackem in a Pirate Rules match. Later in 2011, prior to his departure, Justice would be defeated by Bobby Beverly for the PWO Television Title.

Justice returned to PWO on December 13, 2011. The following week, Justice defeated Benjamin Boone. Justice would seek revenge on The Dead Wrestling Society, leading up to him being defeated by Kirst at Wrestlelution 5.

On the February 10, 2013 edition of Prime Wrestling, Hannan returned once again being announced as the third man in a six-man tag team match at the upcoming Internet pay-per-view, Pressure Rising.

At Pressure Rising, Justice turned heel on Prime Wrestling Commissioner, Justin LaBar, Matt Cross, and Gregory Iron as he pretended to suffer a knee injury during the match, making it a 3-on-1 handicap match, only to later come out and assault Cross with LaBar's stolen laptop to allow Vic Travagliante to become the new permanent Commissioner.

On the April 21, 2013 edition of Prime Wrestling, Justice defeated Facade for the Prime Television Championship due to an interference by Justice's girlfriend, Marti Belle. The two had a celebratory kiss afterward. At Wrestlelution 6 on October 20, Justice lost the Prime Television Title to Matt Cross.

=== World Wrestling Entertainment / WWE (2010–2011) ===
On the May 10, 2010 edition of Raw at the Mellon Arena in Pittsburgh, Pennsylvania, Hannan lost in a dark match against Dos Caras, Jr. Hannan made his WWE television debut as a jobber on the June 13, 2010 episode of WWE Superstars where he faced the team of Vance Archer and Curt Hawkins under the ring name Matthew Busch. Hannan once again appeared on the January 28, 2011 edition of WWE Smackdown, again facing off against Alberto Del Rio in an exhibition Royal Rumble match under the ring name Mike Stevens.

On March 18, 2011, Hannan signed a WWE developmental contract, and was assigned to their developmental territory Florida Championship Wrestling (FCW) located in Tampa, Florida under the ring name Mack Hetfield. After spending six months in Florida, he was released in September 2011.

=== Major League Wrestling (2023–present) ===
As Matthew Justice he has been working for the company Major League Wrestling (MLW), and on November 18, 2023, at Fightland he won the MLW World Tag Team Champion with 1 Called Manders. In May 2024, legendary wrestling manager Bill Alfonso became his manager. On November 9, 2024, at Lucha Apocalypto Matthew Justice won the MLW National Openweight Championship by defeating Bad Dude Tito.

=== Consejo Mundial de Lucha Libre (2025–present) ===
On May 2, 2025, Matthew Justice debuted in Consejo Mundial de Lucha Libre, losing to Último Guerrero for the MLW National Openweight Championship at the Arena México.

== Other media ==
Hannan has also appeared as an extra in three feature films: Abduction, starring Taylor Lautner and Sigourney Weaver; Warrior, starring Tom Hardy and Nick Nolte; and Jack Reacher, starring Tom Cruise.

Hannan is also featured in the Cleveland, Ohio based alternative metal band Mushroomhead's music video for their single "Come On" from the album Beautiful Stories for Ugly Children. The video aired on MTV2's Headbangers Ball.

== Championships and accomplishments ==
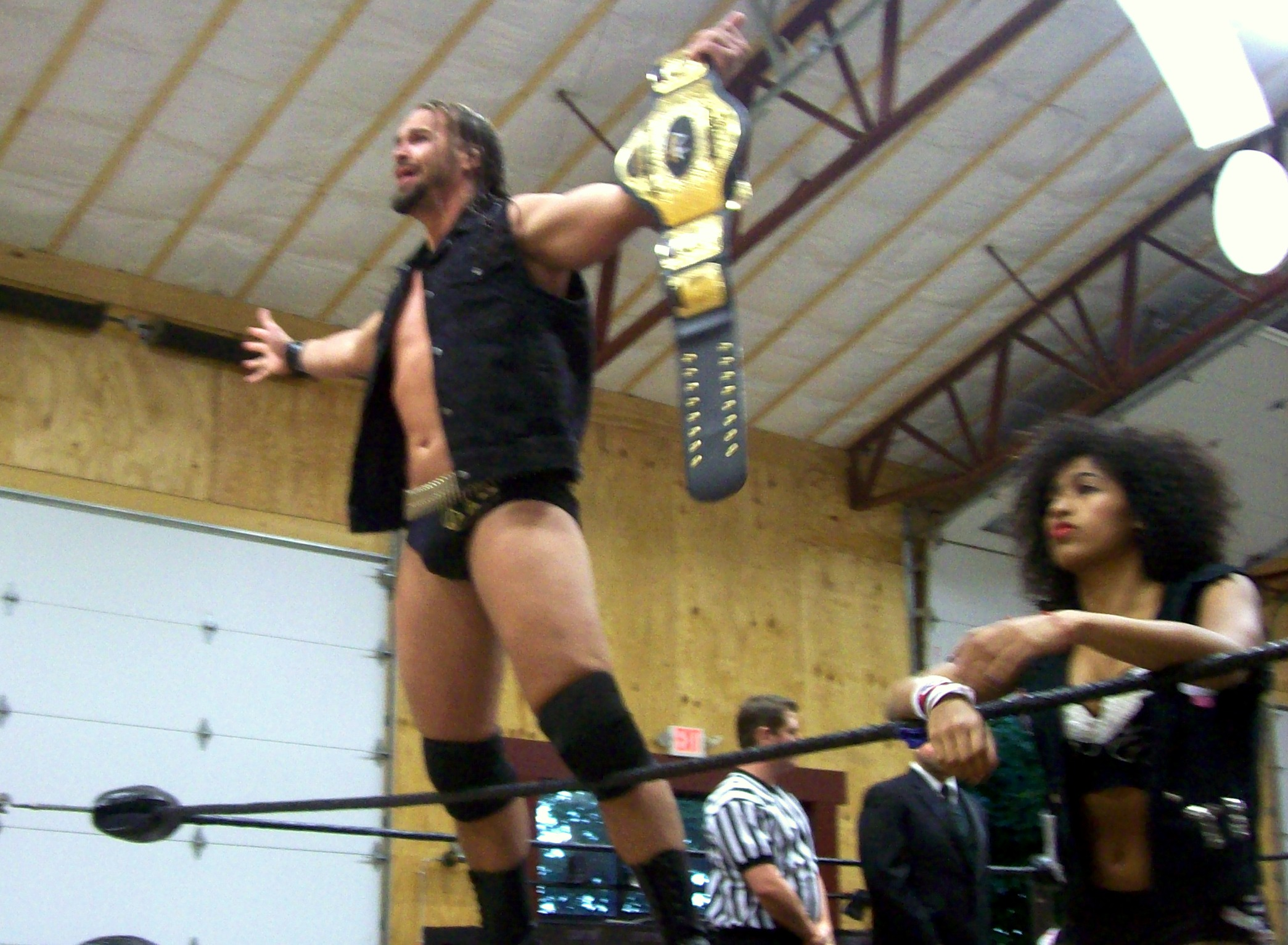
Justice and girlfriend Marti Belle making their entrance at Prime Wrestling show in June 2013

- Absolute Intense Wrestling
  - AIW Absolute Championship (1 time)
  - AIW Intense Championship (2 time)
  - AIW Tag Team Championship (1 time) – with John Thorne
  - JT Lightning Invitational Tournament (2019)
- AAW Wrestling
  - AAW Tag Team Championship (1 time) – with 1 Called Manders
- Blackcraft Wrestling
  - Blackcraft Heavyweight Championship (1 time, final)
- Championship Wrestling Experience
  - CWE Tag Team Championship (1 time) – with Gregory Iron
- Circle 6 Wrestling
  - Circle 6 World Championship (1 time)
- DEFY Wrestling
  - DEFY Tag Team Championship (1 time) – with Mance Warner
- Firestorm Pro Wrestling
  - Firestorm Pro Tag Team Championship (1 time) – with Nickie Valentino
- Game Changer Wrestling
  - GCW Tag Team Championship (1 time) – with Mance Warner
  - Clusterfuck Battle Royal (2022 - with Mance Warner & AJ Gray)
- Horror Slam Wrestling
  - Horror Slam Tag Team Championship (1 time) – with Mance Warner
- International Wrestling Cartel
  - IWC Super Indy Championship (2 time)
- Major League Wrestling
  - MLW National Openweight Championship (1 time)
  - MLW World Tag Team Championship (1 time) – with 1 Called Manders
- Metalmania PDX
  - Metalmania Heavy Metal Championship (1 time)
- NWA East / Pro Wrestling eXpress
  - NWA East/PWX Tag Team Championship (1 time) – with Gregory Iron
- New York Wrestling Connection
  - NYWC Tag Team Championship (2 times) – with Jesse Vane
- Paradigm Pro Wrestling
  - PPW Tag Team Championships (1 time) – with Bobby Beverly
- Pro Wrestling Illustrated
  - Ranked No. 352 of the top 500 singles wrestlers in the PWI 500 in 2021
- Pro Wrestling Ohio / Prime Wrestling
  - Prime Television Championship (1 time)
  - PWO Tag Team Championships (1 time) – with Mitty Rackem
- Pro Wrestling eXpress
  - PWX Television Championship (1 time)
  - PWX Three Rivers Championship (1 time)
- The Wrestling Revolver
  - Revolver World Tag Team Championship (1 time) – with Mance Warner and 1 Called Manders
- Vicious Outcast Wrestling
  - Natural Cup Tournament (2014)
