= Contra Unit =

- The stable's logo

Stable
- Leader: Josef Samael (manager)
- Members: See below
- Former members: See below
- Debut: February 2, 2019
- Years active: 2019–present

Contra Unit (often simply called Contra) is a villainous professional wrestling stable led and managed by Josef Samael. They perform in Major League Wrestling (MLW).

The stable was formed at the SuperFight event on February 2, 2019, when Jacob Fatu and Josef Samael made their MLW debut and formed their alliance with Simon Gotch by attacking his opponent Ace Romero. The group made its televised debut at Intimidation Games and dominated MLW roster throughout the year, becoming the top villainous group of the company. The group cemented its dominance over MLW when Fatu won the World Heavyweight Championship at Kings of Colosseum on July 6, 2019. Ikuro Kwon was added to the group as its fourth member in August.

Following a storyline where Contra took over and shut down MLW in May 2020 and were subsequently ousted from power in October of the same year, they were joined by a masked man known as The Black Hand of Contra on November 18, who was then renamed "Mads Krügger" on the December 2 episode of Fusion. The group would then add Daivari to their ranks at the 2021 Kings of Colosseum. The group would lose Gotch and Daivari and then seem to disband at War Chamber 2021 after losing Fatu and Samael, with Kwon announcing his renouncement from the group.

At SuperFight on January 3, 2024, Krügger made his return to MLW, along with Contra Unit's Sentai Death Squad, attacking Jacob Fatu after his match with Yuji Nagata and hitting him with a Baklei bottle, reviving Contra in MLW.

== History ==
=== Background and formation (2019) ===
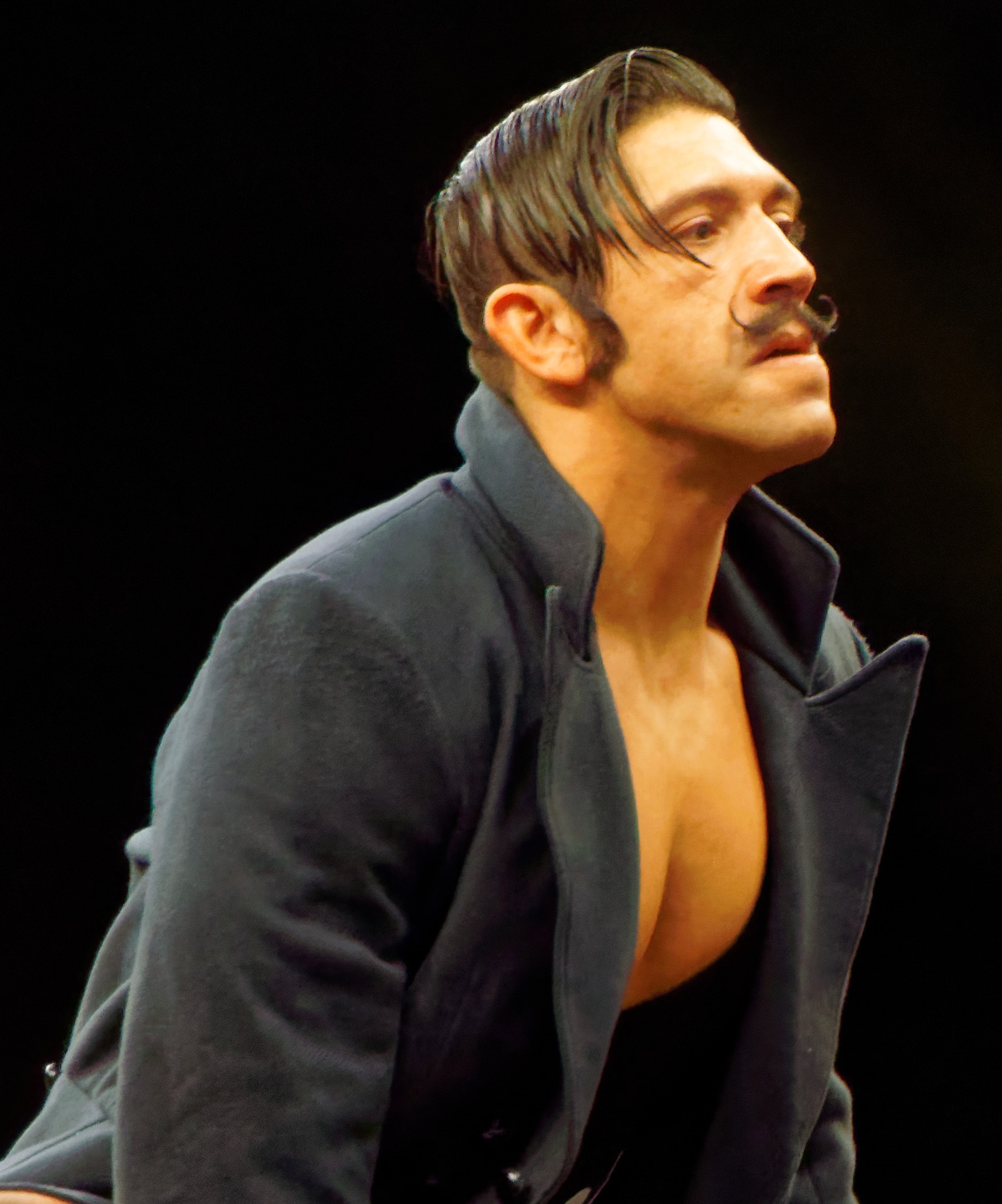
Simon Gotch

Jacob Fatu and The Almighty Sheik were previously a part of a stable called the "Warbeast" with Brody King and Kevin Sullivan and competed on the independent circuit winning many tag team titles in various promotions. In January 2019, Warbeast members Fatu and Sheik signed a contract with Major League Wrestling and MLW announced on its website that Jacob Fatu would make his MLW debut at SuperFight. Sheik was repackaged as Josef Samael and he and Fatu made their MLW debut in a non-televised match by defeating local wrestlers Chico Adams and Kwame Nas at SuperFight. Later at the event, the duo allied themselves with Simon Gotch by destroying his opponent Ace Romero, during which Gotch proclaimed that the group as "global merchants of violence" and named it "Contra" and waved a self-designated Contra flag. The pair made its televised debut at Intimidation Games by destroying Tom Lawlor after he retained the MLW World Heavyweight Championship against Low Ki in a Steel cage match. Contra Unit led another attack on Ace Romero during Romero's match against Simon Gotch on the March 9 episode of Fusion. The next week, on Fusion, Fatu and Samael had their first televised match in MLW against Chico Adams and Vertigo Rivera, where they got themselves disqualified after Samael brutalized them with his spike. Fatu entered the titular match at the Battle Riot II on April 5, where Contra poured gas on various participants, which led to them being disqualified from the match. Later that night, Contra attacked Tom Lawlor again during a post-event press conference.

Contra Unit planned a hostile takeover of MLW, continuing its dominance and rise as Fatu ended Barrington Hughes' undefeated streak in MLW in a quick match on the May 11 episode of Fusion. Fatu and Samael would go on to defeat Hughes and Romero in a tag team match on the May 25 episode of Fusion. Later at that episode, Contra Unit destroyed Low Ki as well as Tom Lawlor for the third time after Lawlor's successful title defense against Avalanche.

=== Ascension to the top and MLW takeover (2019–2020) ===
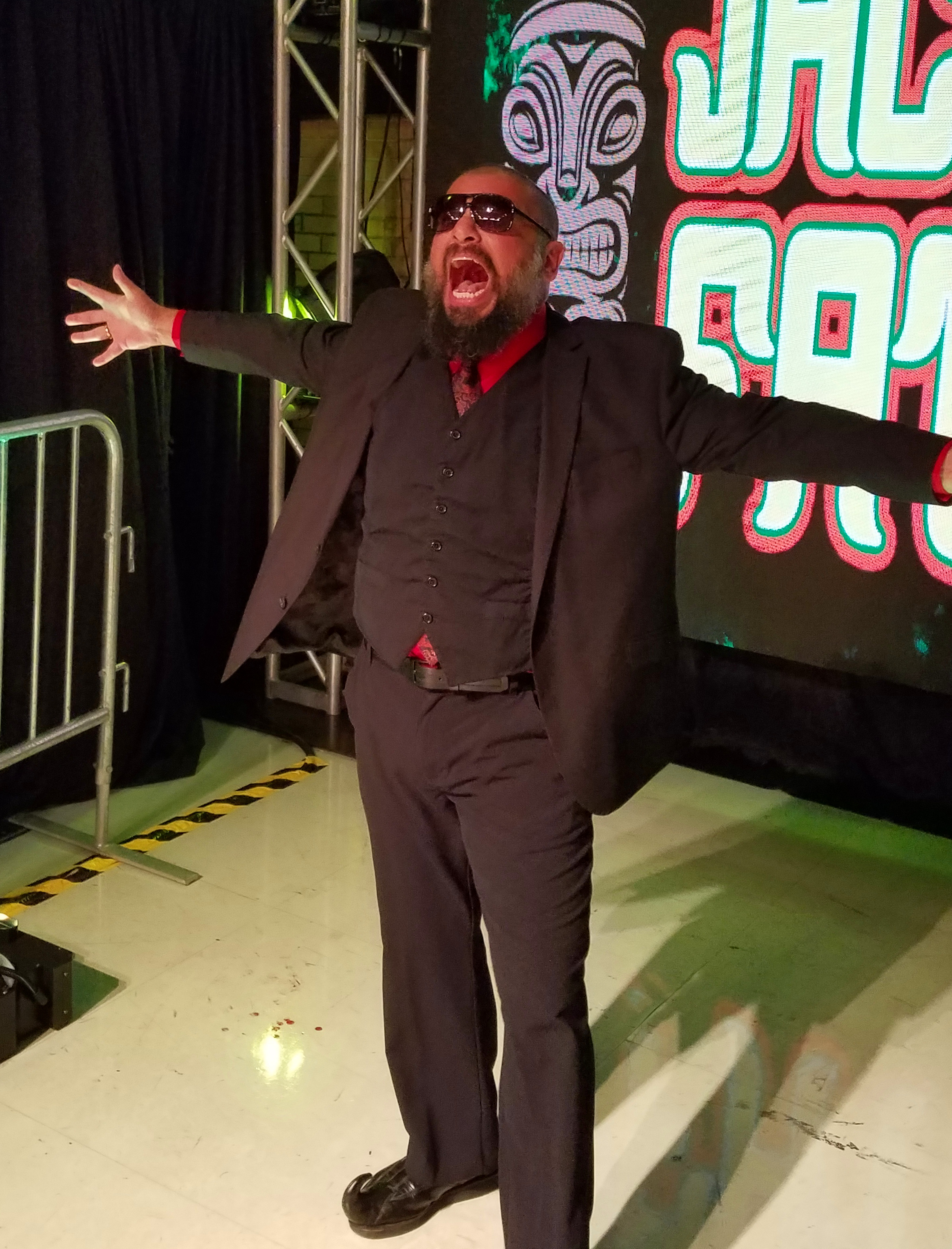
Josef Samael

Lawlor enlisted the help of Marshall and Ross Von Erich for a rivalry with Contra Unit, as the team of Lawlor and Von Erichs defeated Contra Unit in a six-man tag team match. The rivalry between Lawlor and Contra Unit intensified, which set up a match between Fatu and Lawlor for the World Heavyweight Championship at Kings of Colosseum on July 6, which Fatu won, thus capturing the title and cementing Contra Unit's dominance over MLW.

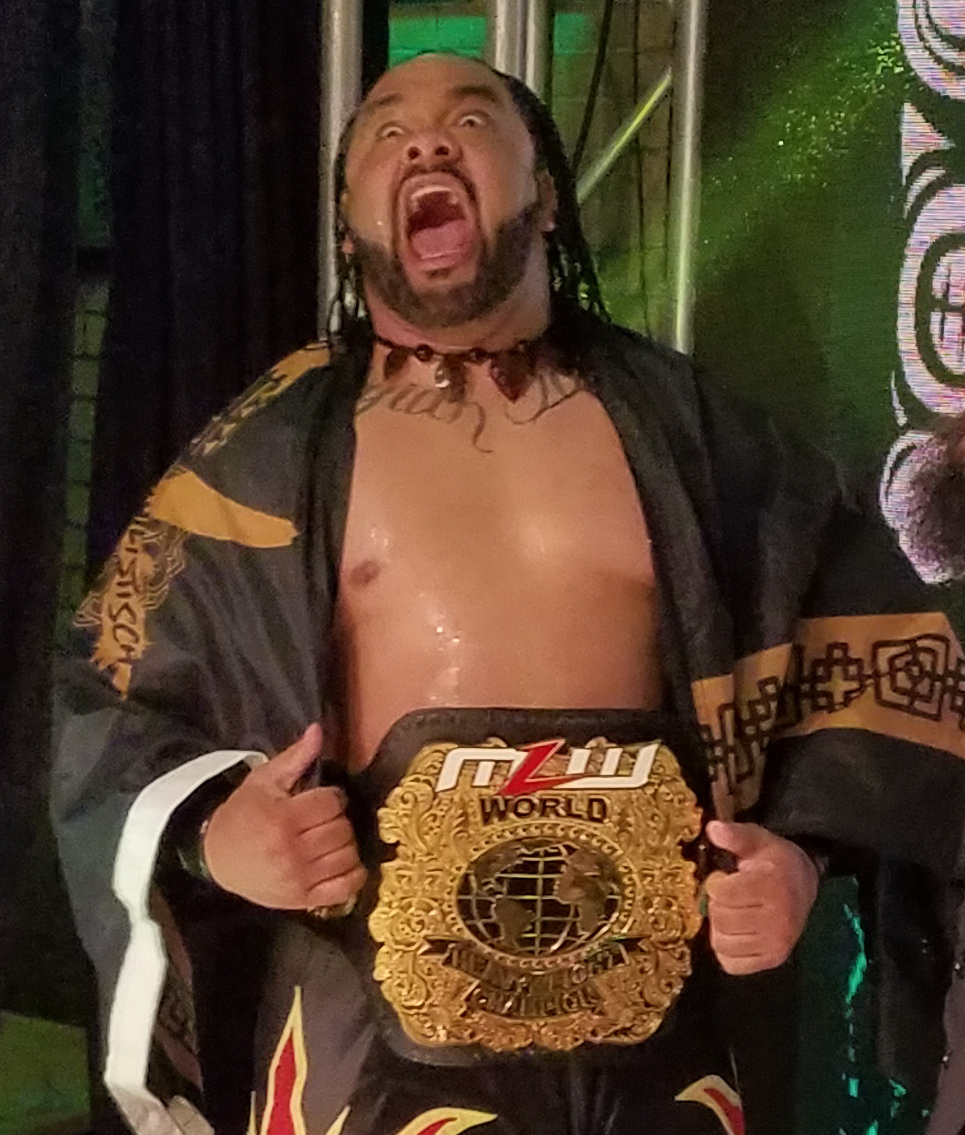
Jacob Fatu

The rivalry continued between Contra Unit and the team of Lawlor and Von Erichs, leading up to a War Chamber match at the namesake event. Contra Unit introduced a fourth member Ikuro Kwon on the August 3 episode of Fusion, who spit mist into Marshall Von Erich's eyes. Low Ki would soon join Lawlor and Von Erichs in the rivalry by helping them fend off and destroyed by Contra Unit after Fatu successfully defended the World Heavyweight Championship against Lawlor in a rematch on the August 31 episode of Fusion. Contra Unit would lose to Low Ki, Lawlor and Von Erichs in the titular match at War Chamber to settle the rivalry.

Contra Unit's next rival was against Salina de la Renta's stable Promociones Dorado, which began after LA Park decided to cash in his Golden Ticket opportunity by winning the Battle Riot against Jacob Fatu for the World Heavyweight Championship at MLW's first-ever pay-per-view Saturday Night SuperFight on November 2. In the warm-up to the match, Promociones Dorado members LA Park, Bestia 666 and Mecha Wolf defeated Kwon, Gotch and Samael in a six-man tag team match on the final episode of Fusion before the pay-per-view. However, Fatu retained the title against Park at Saturday Night SuperFight.

Contra would plant the seeds of a potential rivalry with The Hart Foundation after Josef Samael threw a fireball on Teddy Hart, thus costing the latter, the World Middleweight Championship against Myron Reed on the November 11 episode of Fusion. Hart would subsequently depart MLW while Contra would then resume their feud with the Von Erichs as Fatu issued a World Heavyweight Championship opportunity to Marshall Von Erich. However, Marshall was mysteriously destroyed and his brother Ross Von Erich challenged Fatu instead but was defeated after Tom Lawlor betrayed Ross. Contra would wreak havoc in Japan in November, leading to a six-man tag team match on the January 1, 2020 episode of Fusion, in which Fatu, Kwon and Gotch defeated Strong Hearts (Cima, El Lindaman and Shigehiro Irie). The rival with the Strong Hearts would conclude with Fatu retaining the World Heavyweight Championship against Cima on the March 7 episode of Fusion.

Hart Foundation would begin feuding with Contra to avenge Contra's destroy on Teddy Hart, which led to Davey Boy Smith, Jr. defeating Gotch in a No Holds Barred match on the February 1 episode of Fusion and Fatu retained the World Heavyweight Championship against Brian Pillman Jr. on the February 8 episode of Fusion. On the May 10 episode of Fusion, Contra destroyed several MLW wrestlers in the backstage area and took over MLW's headquarters, thus taking over the promotion and "shutting it down" (storyline explanation for MLW's hiatus due to the COVID-19 pandemic). Injustice member Kotto Brazil was one of the wrestlers injured in the assault which ended his MLW career as an explanation for his legitimate departure from the promotion.

=== Expansion, departures and returns (2020–present) ===
Contra was ousted from power in October and MLW resumed events on the November 18 episode of Fusion, where Fatu retained the World Heavyweight Championship against Davey Boy Smith, Jr. Alexander Hammerstone confronted Fatu after the match and was attacked by the debuting The Black Hand of Contra, who was later revealed to be Mads Krügger. On the December 9 episode of Fusion, Fatu and Gotch challenged The Von Erichs for the World Tag Team Championship and the match ended in a no contest after Injustice member Jordan Oliver and Violence is Forever interfered in the match and attacked all the competitors. Oliver would soon begin challenging Gotch to a match to avenge the attack on Kotto Brazil in May, setting up a match between Gotch and Oliver at Kings of Colosseum on January 6, 2021. However, Gotch faked injury and the match was cancelled. However, later at the event, Contra attacked Injustice after Myron Reed lost the World Middleweight Championship to Lio Rush. The debuting Daivari would get involved in the attack thus becoming the newest member of Contra Unit. Krügger would challenge Hammerstone for the National Openweight Championship at the event and the match ended in a double count-out.

Gotch and Oliver had a match on the January 20 episode of Fusion, which Gotch won via referee stoppage. On the February 3 episode of Fusion, Hammerstone defended the National Openweight Championship against Krügger in a Baklei Brawl, which Hammerstone won to retain but it was revealed to be a fake Krügger as the real Krügger attacked Hammerstone after the match. Fatu retained the World Heavyweight Championship against Oliver on the March 3 episode of Fusion and Contra attacked Injustice after the match but Calvin Tankman made the save and challenged Fatu to a match for the title. In the meanwhile, Daivari and Gotch competed against Los Parks and Injustice in a three-way match for the World Tag Team Championship on the March 17 episode of Fusion, where Los Parks retained the titles. At Never Say Never, Gotch lost to Oliver and Daivari lost to Reed while Fatu retained the World Heavyweight Championship against Tankman due to outside interference by Daivari. On October 2 at Fightland Fatu lost the world title to Alexander Hammerstone, ending his record setting reign at 819 days. The stable would seemingly dissolve at War Chamber after losing the titular match to the Hammerheads. This was also heavily implied to be the case by MLW's YouTube channel, which stated Kwon had renounced Contra and left, Fatu going on his own way and Krügger vowing revenge, along with Josef Samael being released and removed from MLW's Roster page on MLW.com. This would be ignored, however in future episodes of Fusion, which would have Kwon providing backup for Krügger, both men having Contra logos in their entrance videos and commentators referring to Contra in the present tense along with referencing Krügger and Kwon looking for new members.

==== Return to MLW (2024–present) ====
At SuperFight on January 3, 2024, Krügger made his return to MLW, along with Contra Unit's Sentai Death Squad, attacking Jacob Fatu after his match with Yuji Nagata and hitting him with a Baklei bottle. At War Chamber on March 29, 2024, Ikuro Kwon returned to MLW and assisted Contra Unit in attacking The Second Gear Crew (Matthew Justice and 1 Called Manders) and CozyMax (Shigeo Okumura and Satoshi Kojima). On May 18, 2024, at Fury Road, Janai Kai was revealed to have joined Contra Unit. On June 1, 2024, at Battle Riot VI, Suzuki joined the Contra Unit teaming with Krügger and Kwon to defeat Satoshi Kojima, Matt Riddle, and Akira in a six-man tag team match. Suzuki and Kwon would then defeat CozyMax to win the MLW World Tag Team Championships at Summer of the Beasts on August 29. At One Shot on December 5, 2024, Kwon and Suzuki lost the MLW World Tag Team Championship to CozyMax and at the same event, Krügger defeated the debuting Babathunder. After the match, Krügger invited Babathunder to join Contra Unit, which he accepted.

On January 11, 2025, at Kings of Colosseum, Krügger defeated Matthew Justice, Mr. Thomas, Brett Ryan Gosselin and Akira to win the Gravity Gramble contract for a future MLW World Heavyweight Championship match at any time of his choosing. On January 25 at Reloaded, Suzuki lost to Tom Lawlor, which was Suzuki's last appearance in MLW and as a member of Contra Unit. On April 5 at Battle Riot VII, Kwon and Krügger entered the Battle Riot match but were eliminated by Alex Hammerstone and Rob Van Dam and eventual winner Matt Riddle respectively, thus failing to win the MLW World Heavyweight Championship in the process. On May 20, Kai left MLW and thus was silently removed from Contra Unit. At War Chamber on June 6, Krügger and Babathunder defeated Filthy Bros (Matt Riddle and Tom Lawlor) in a Chicago Street Fight, which was Babathunder's final appearance in MLW. On August 9 at Blood and Thunder, Kwon was knocked out of the Opera Cup in the first round by Místico. At Fightland on September 14, Kwon failed to win the MLW World Middleweight Championship against Templario while Krügger defeated previous champion Riddle and Donovan Dijak to win the MLW World Heavyweight Championship after cashing his Gravity Gramble contract. On October 4 at Slaughterhouse, Krügger defeated C.W. Anderson, Brock Anderson, Mr. Thomas, Matthew Justice and Chris Adonis in a Chamber of Horrors match to retain the MLW World Heavyweight Championship. At Symphony of Horrors on October 25, Krügger and Riddle failed to win the MLW World Tag Team Championship from The Skyscrapers (Donovan Dijak and Bishop Dyer). On November 20 at MLW x Don Gato Tequila: Lucha de los Muertos, Kwon failed to win the MLW World Middleweight Championship in a three-way match against defending champion Templario and Guerrero Maya Jr., while Krügger retained the MLW World Heavyweight Championship in a Bunkhouse match against Brock Anderson. On December 29, Krügger left Contra Unit.

On January 29, 2026, at Battle Riot VIII, Kushida joined Contra Unit after turning heel on Templario, Simon Gotch and Babathunder returned for one night only to attack Mads Krule Krügger, and Kananga joined Contra Unit. On the June 6 episode MLW Fusion, Okumura joined Contra Unit. On the July 18 episode of Fusion, Big Damo joined Contra Unit. On the August 1 episode of Fusion, Samael made his return to MLW, attacking Krügger before rejoining Contra Unit revealing himself as the mysterious Serpent, who is the supposed mastermind of Contra Unit. On the August 15 episode of Fusion, Kananga was repackaged under the new ring name Jumbo and removed all association with Contra, marking his departure. On the September 24, 2026 episode of Fusion, Masha was introduced as the newest member of Contra.

== Members ==
Contra Unit
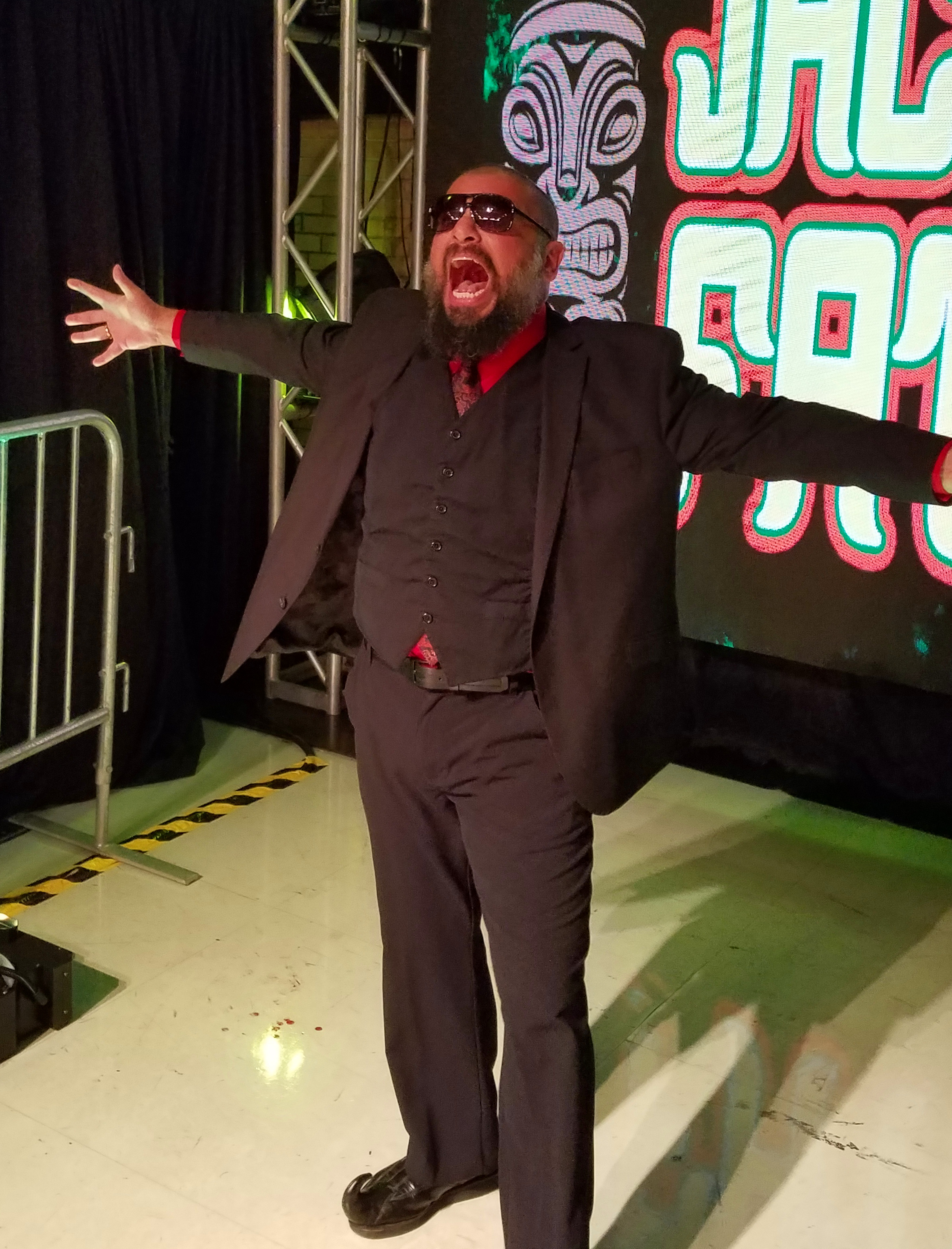
Josef Samael (III/M)

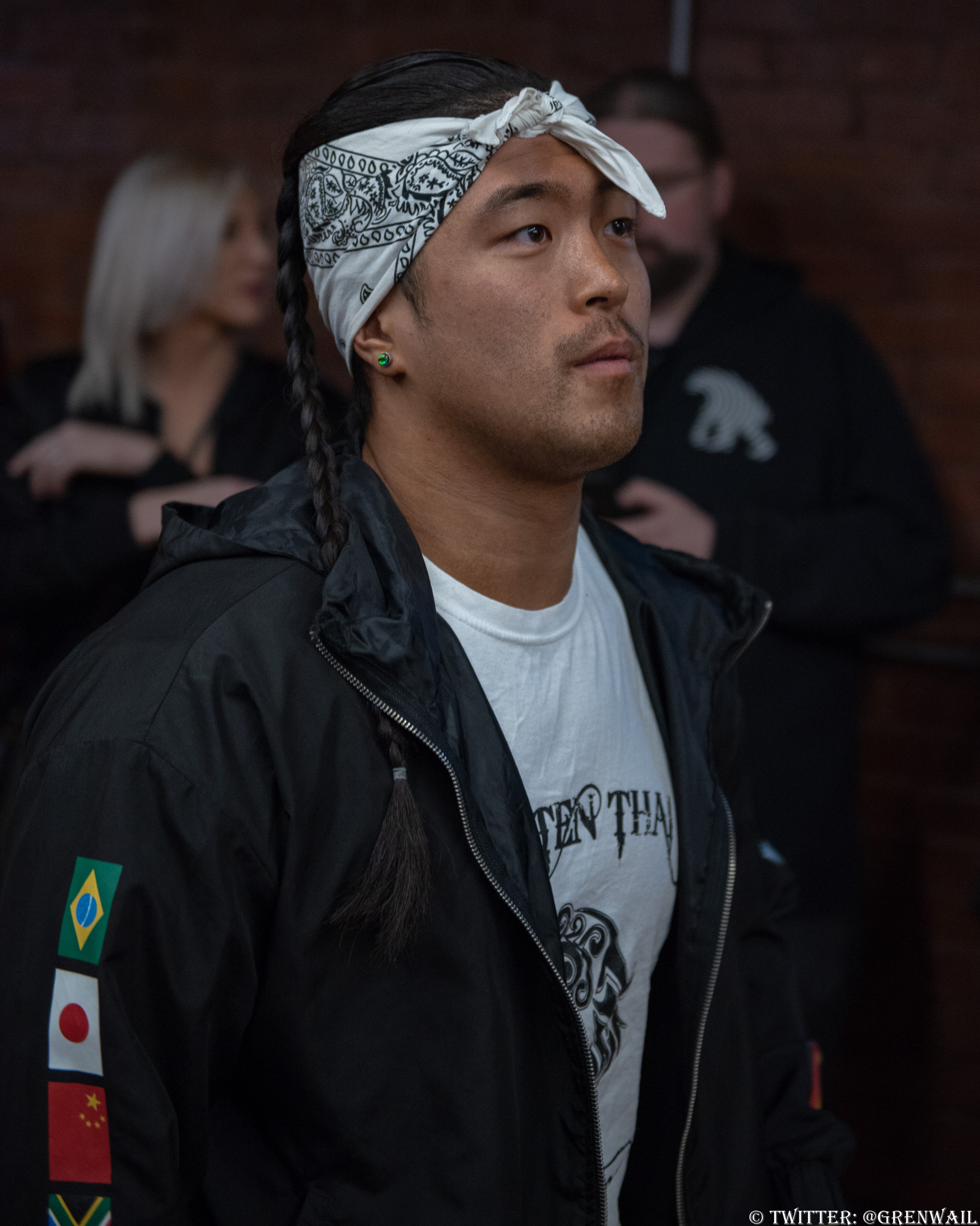
Ikuro Kwon

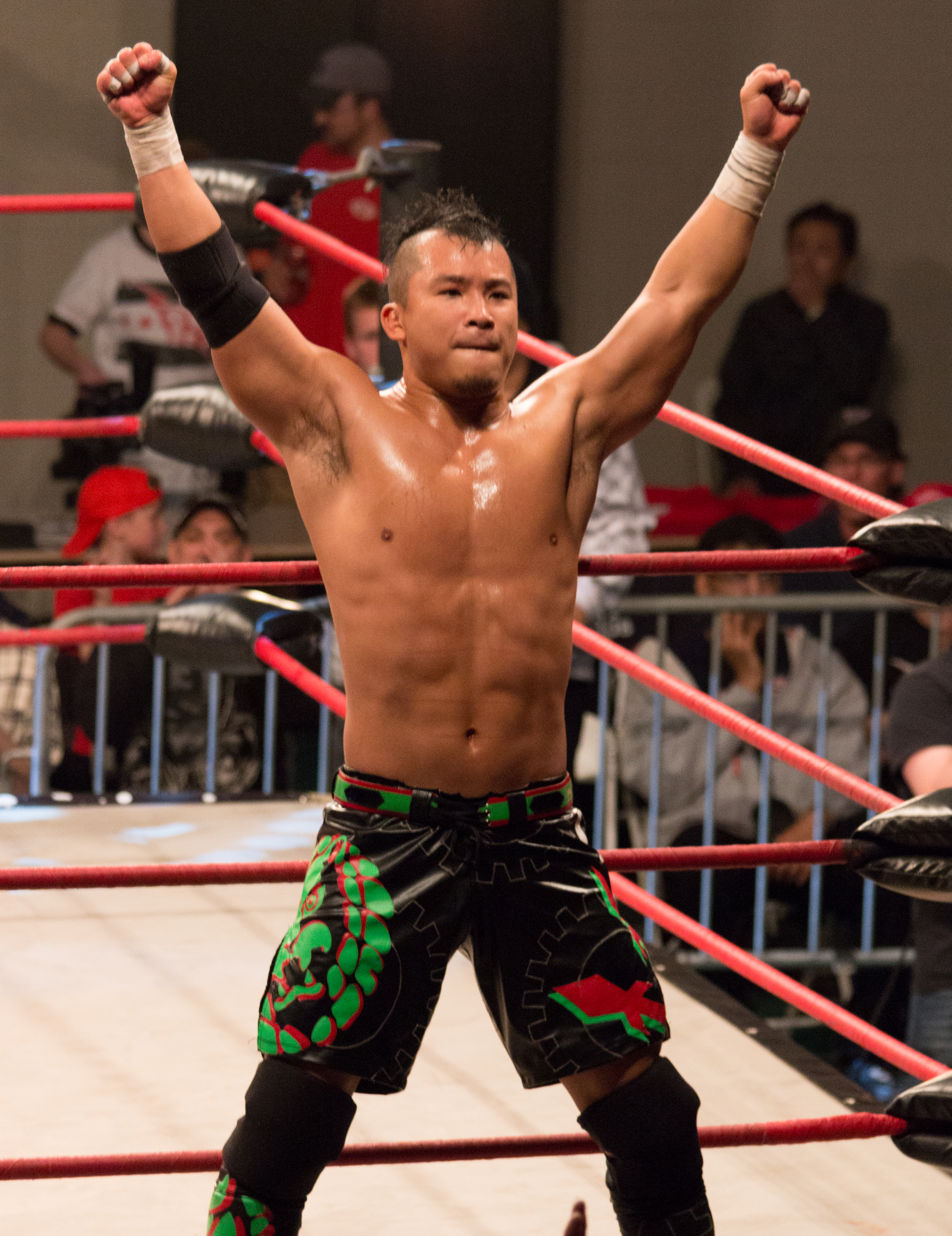
Kushida

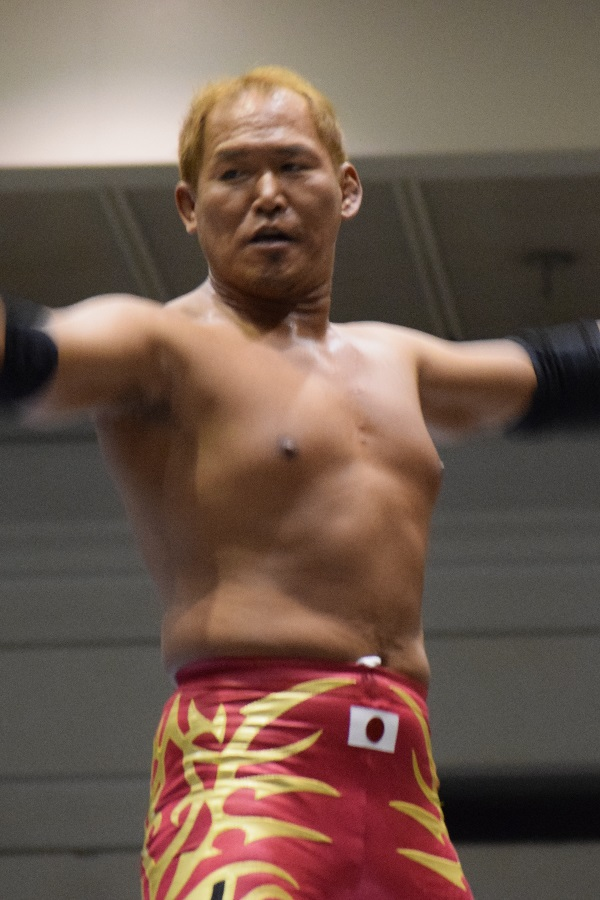
Okumura

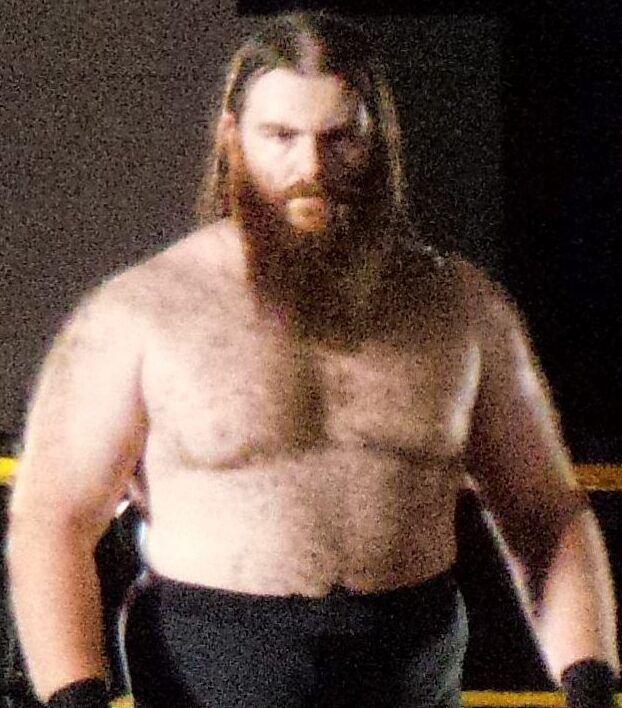
Big Damo

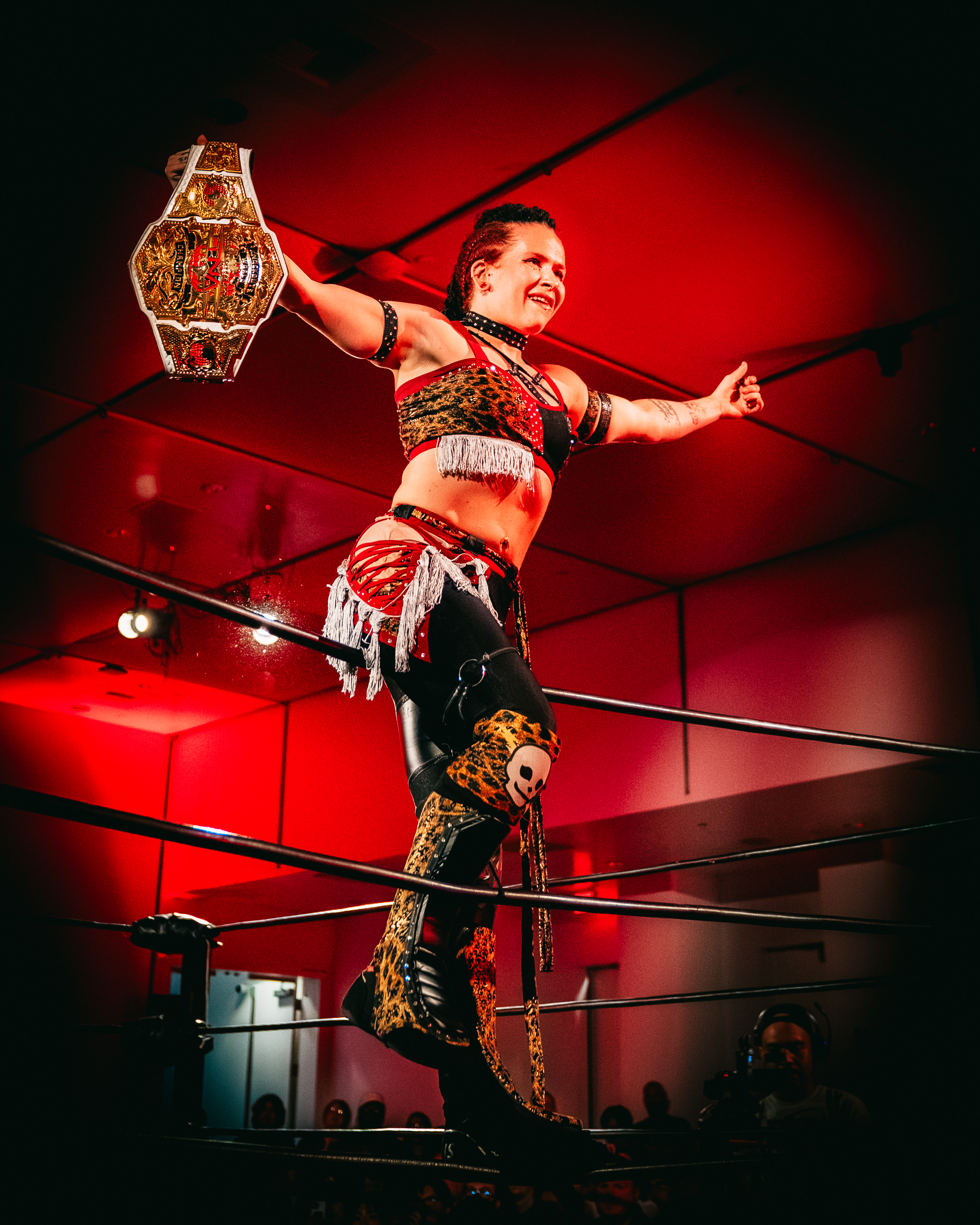
Masha

*	Founding member(s)
I-III	Leader(s)
M	Manager

=== Current ===
Member		Joined
Josef Samael	*III/M	February 2, 2019 (Note: Samael left the stable on November 6, 2021 and returned on August 1, 2026.)
Sentai Death Squad		July 10, 2021
Ikuro Kwon		August 3, 2019 (Note: Kwon left the stable on December 14, 2021 and returned on March 29, 2024.)
Kushida		January 29, 2026
Okumura		June 6, 2026
Big Damo		July 18, 2026
Brick Savage		August 22, 2026
Masha		September 24, 2026

=== Former ===
Member		Joined	Left
Simon Gotch	*	February 2, 2019	January 31, 2021
Daivari		January 6, 2021	June 12, 2021
Jacob Fatu	*I	February 2, 2019	November 6, 2021
Janai Kai		May 18, 2024	May 20, 2025
Minoru Suzuki		June 1, 2024	January 25, 2025
Babathunder		December 5, 2024	June 7, 2025
Mads Krule Krügger	II	November 18, 2020	December 29, 2025
Kananga		January 29, 2026	August 15, 2026

== Sub-groups ==
=== Current ===
Affiliate	Members	Tenure	Type
J-Unit	Ikuro Kwon; Okumura	2026–present	Tag team

=== Former ===
Affiliate	Members	Tenure	Type
Warbeast	Jacob Fatu; Josef Samael	2019–2021	Tag team

== Championships and accomplishments ==
- All Pro Wrestling
  - APW Tag Team Championship (1 time) - Samael and Fatu
- Major League Wrestling
  - MLW World Heavyweight Championship (2 times) – Fatu (1), Krügger (1)
  - MLW World Women's Featherweight Championship (2 times, current) – Kai (1), Masha (1, current)
  - MLW World Tag Team Championship (1 time) – Kwon and Suzuki
  - MLW World Middleweight Championship (1 time) – Kushida
- IndependentWrestling.TV
  - Independent Wrestling World Championship (1 time) - Mads Krügger
- PCW Ultra
  - PCW Ultra Tag Team Championship (1 time) - Samael and Fatu
- Pro Wrestling Illustrated
  - Ranked Jacob Fatu No. 306 of the top 500 singles wrestlers in the PWI 500 in 2019
