= MLW x Don Gato Tequila: Lucha de los Muertos =

2025 Major League Wrestling event

- Promotional poster for the event
- Promotion: Major League Wrestling
- Date: November 20, 2025
- City: Charleston, South Carolina
- Venue: Charleston Music Hall

Event chronology
← Previous; Slaughterhouse	Next → Battle Riot VIII

Lucha de los Muertos chronology
← Previous; First	Next → 2026

MLW x Don Gato Tequila: Lucha de los Muertos (also promoted as simply MLW x Don Gato Tequila) was a professional wrestling event produced by Major League Wrestling (MLW) that took place on November 20, 2025, at the Charleston Music Hall in Charleston, South Carolina. The event aired live on BeIN Sports USA and streamed live on MLW's YouTube channel.

The event featured an appearance from Arn Anderson, the returns of Killer Kross and Scarlett Bordeaux, and the debuts of the Good Brothers (Doc Gallows and Karl Anderson) and Isla Dawn.

== Production ==
=== Background ===
Over the summer, MLW introduced the character of "Don Gato," a famous luchador-turned-tequila entrepreneur. Retiring from wrestling after his mentor's death, Don Gato was involved in a pyramid scheme, taking the money that he made from both the scheme and selling his car with him to Las Vegas. Initially finding little success, Don Gato became "inspired" by the complimentary tequila before finally winning it big. Don Gato would return to his home state of Jalisco, buying a plot of land to use for agave farming, and began his tequila business. Don Gato Tequila would eventually become a major sponsor of MLW, with actor Danny McBride joining Don Gato as his spokesman.

On August 11, 2025, MLW announced a collaborative event with McBride and Don Gato Tequila entitled "MLW x Don Gato: Lucha de los Muertos." The event would take place at the Charleston Music Hall in Charleston, South Carolina on November 20, 2025, marking MLW's first event in the state of South Carolina.

=== Storylines ===
The card consisted of matches that result from scripted storylines, where wrestlers portrayed villains, heroes, or less distinguishable characters in scripted events that built tension and culminate in a wrestling match or series of matches, with results predetermined by MLW's writers. Storylines were played out at MLW events, and across the league's social media platforms.

The event would play host to the finals of the 2025 Opera Cup, which began at Blood and Thunder on August 9. The first round continued in September at both Fightland and Fury Road, and the quarterfinals were held the following month at Slaughterhouse. The semifinals were held at Symphony of Horrors, where Volador Jr. and Místico defeated Satoshi Kojima and Austin Aries, respectfully, to advance to the finals.

At Slaughterhouse, Mads Krule Krügger defended the MLW World Heavyweight Championship in a Chamber of Horrors match, a cage match that could only end when a wrestler placed one of their opponents in an electric chair and electrocuted them. Involved in the match were The Andersons (Brock Anderson and C. W. Anderson), the latter of which was the unfortunate victim of the chair due to Krügger, who retained his title. Three weeks later, at Symphony of Horrors, a remorseful Brock vowed to avenge C. W. by challenging Krügger to a Bunkhouse match for the MLW World Heavyweight Championship. Later that night, while Krügger was backstage fighting with MLW World Tag Team Champions The Skyscrapers (Donovan Dijak and Bishop Dyer), Brock ran in and hit Krügger from behind with a chair. Though ineffective, MLW President Cesar Duran intervened and granted Brock his title match at Lucha de los Muertos. Brock's father Arn Anderson, who was previously announced to make an appearance, would be in his son's corner for the match.

At Slaughterhouse, Shotzi Blackheart hosted the debut edition of her talk show segment, "The Graveyard Shift." However, after the segment ended in chaos, the video wall began playing a vignette from Priscilla Kelly (formerly Gigi Dolin in WWE and Blackheart's old tag team partner), who lamented MLW giving Blackheart much attention while she had none drawn to her. At the following event, Symphony of Horrors, after Blackheart competed in a match, she was attacked backstage by a hooded figure. Believing it to be Kelly, Blackheart demanded a match with her from Cesar Duran and Vice President of Wrestling Relations Salina de la Renta. MLW would later announce the match was made official for Lucha de los Muertos.

== Results ==
No.	Results	Stipulations	Times
1^{P}	Cody Fluffman defeated Drew Aldean by pinfall	Singles match	3:18
2	Scarlett Bordeaux defeated Isla Dawn by pinfall	Singles match	4:24
3	The Good Brothers (Doc Gallows and Karl Anderson) defeated The Skyscrapers (Donovan Dijak and Bishop Dyer) (c) by disqualification	Tag team match for the MLW World Tag Team Championship	6:24
4	Diego Hill (with Blue Panther) defeated Okumura and Stigma by pinfall	Three-way Lightning match	4:52
5	El Galeón Fantasma (Barboza and Difunto) defeated Los Panthers (Blue Panther and Blue Panther Jr.), Los Felinos (El Felino and Felino Jr.), and Los Atlantis (Atlantis and Atlantis Jr.) by pinfall	"Gato's Gauntlet" four-way tag team match	7:16
6	Shotzi Blackheart defeated Priscilla Kelly by pinfall	Singles match	5:21
7	Templario (c) defeated Guerrero Maya Jr. and Ikuro Kwon by pinfall	Three-way match for the MLW World Middleweight Championship; Don Gato was the special guest enforcer.	4:43
8	Mads Krule Krügger (c) defeated Brock Anderson (with Arn Anderson and C.W. Anderson) by pinfall	Bunkhouse match for the MLW World Heavyweight Championship	7:32
9	Místico defeated Volador Jr. by submission	2025 Opera Cup Finals	10:53
10	Killer Kross (with Scarlett Bordeaux) defeated Matt Riddle by submission	Singles match	10:41
(c) / – the champion(s) heading into the match; P / – the match was broadcast on the pre-show

=== Opera Cup tournament brackets (2025) ===
First round Blood and Thunder (August 9); Fightland (September 13); Fury Road (September 27)
Místico	Pin
Ikuro Kwon	7:47
Último Guerrero	Pin
Esfinge	11:05
Austin Aries	Pin
Kushida	12:28
Paul London	Pin
Okumura	4:29
Volador Jr.	Pin
Titán	15:57
Blue Panther Jr.	6:11
Zandokan Jr.^{1}	Pin
Satoshi Kojima	Pin
Bobby Fish	8:50
Bishop Dyer	Pin
Anthony Greene	7:43

Quarterfinals; Slaughterhouse (October 4)
Místico	Sub
Último Guerrero	10:11
Austin Aries	Pin
Paul London	9:07
Volador Jr.	Pin
Star Jr.^{1}	6:21
Satoshi Kojima	Pin
Bishop Dyer	11:06

Semifinals; Symphony of Horrors (October 25)
Místico	Pin
Austin Aries	15:57
Volador Jr.	Pin
Satoshi Kojima	6:53

Final; MLW x Don Gato Tequila: Lucha de los Muertos (November 20)
Místico	Sub
Volador Jr.	10:53

1 Zandokan Jr. was forced to withdraw due to a knee injury, so as an alternate, Star Jr. took his place.
