= Azteca Lucha (2025) =

2025 Major League Wrestling and Consejo Mundial de Lucha Libre event

- Promotional poster of the event
- Promotion(s): Major League Wrestling; Consejo Mundial de Lucha Libre
- Date: May 10, 2025
- City: Cicero, Illinois
- Venue: Cicero Stadium
- Attendance: 1,500-2,000

Event chronology
← Previous; MLW + CMLL: CMLL vs. MLW	Next → MLW: Summer of the Beasts; CMLL: CMLL vs. AEW & ROH

Azteca chronology
← Previous; 2024	Next → —

Azteca Lucha (2025) is a professional wrestling live streaming event produced by Major League Wrestling (MLW) and Consejo Mundial de Lucha Libre (CMLL), which took place on May 10, 2025, at the Cicero Stadium in Cicero, Illinois. It was the fourth event under the MLW Azteca chronology and streamed live on MLW's YouTube channel. The event featured various wrestlers from partner promotion Consejo Mundial de Lucha Libre (CMLL).

Additional matches were taped for War Chamber, which was aired as a TV special on June 7 on BeIN Sports USA and YouTube.

== Production ==
=== Background ===
The concept MLW's Azteca events are based on story elements from the defunct Lucha Libre promotion and former television drama, Lucha Underground. On November 7, 2024, MLW announced that it would be holding Azteca Lucha on May 10, 2025, at the Cicero Stadium in Cicero, Illinois.

=== Storylines ===
The card consisted of matches that result from scripted storylines, where wrestlers portray villains, heroes, or less distinguishable characters in scripted events that built tension and culminate in a wrestling match or series of matches, with results predetermined by MLW's writers.

At Battle Riot VII, Místico was originally set to defend the MLW World Middleweight Championship against Templario. However, the match was postponed due to Místico suffering a triceps injury. At the event, Místico declared that he would relinquish his title due to his injury, handing the belt to MLW president Cesar Duran. This segment would be interrupted by Ikuro Kwon of Contra Unit, who spat mist in Duran's face and stole the title belt. Per MLW's website, an infuriated Místico wanted a match with both Templario and Kwon, so Duran signed a three-way match between all three men at Azteca Lucha.

MLW World Heavyweight Champion Matt Riddle and World Titan Federation (WTF) talent Donovan Dijak had been embroiled in a feud for several months, stemming from One Shot in December, where Riddle defeated Dijak to protect his Battle Riot title opportunity. At Battle Riot VII, Riddle – now champion – and training partner Tom Lawlor were interviewed by WTF promoter Saint Laurent, only to be ambushed by Dijak and new WTF signee Bishop Dyer, leading to both men being severely injured. All four men would compete in the titular match contested for Riddle's world title, where Riddle, despite injured ribs, won and retained the title after eliminating Dijak and Rob Van Dam in succession. On April 30, Saint Laurent challenged Riddle on behalf of Dijak for a world title match at Azteca Lucha. The match was made official not too long after.

== Results ==
Azteca Lucha
No.	Results	Stipulations	Times
1	Los Depredadores (Magnus and Rugido) (c) defeated Los Divinos Laguneros (Blue Panther Jr. and Dark Panther) by pinfall	Tag team match for the MLW World Tag Team Championship	13:21
2	Alex Hammerstone defeated Satoshi Kojima by pinfall	Singles match	12:18
3	Atlantis and Esfinge defeated Guerrero Maya Jr. and Hechicero by pinfall	Tag team match	11:44
4	Último Guerrero (c) defeated Bárbaro Cavernario and Zandokan Jr. by pinfall	Three-way match for the MLW National Openweight Championship	10:24
5	Matt Riddle (c) defeated Donovan Dijak (with Saint Laurent) by submission	Singles match for the MLW World Heavyweight Championship	14:29
6	Místico defeated Templario and Ikuro Kwon by pinfall	Three-way match	11:29
(c) / – the champion(s) heading into the match

War Chamber (June 7)
No.	Results	Stipulations	Times
1	Contra Unit (Babathunder and Mads Krule Krügger) defeated Filthy Bros (Matt Riddle and Tom Lawlor) by pinfall	Chicago Street Fight	8:51
2	Myron Reed defeated Ariel Dominguez by pinfall	Lightning match	3:53
3	Los Divinos Laguneros (Blue Panther Jr. and Dark Panther) defeated CozyMax (Satoshi Kojima and Okumura) by countout	Tag team match	7:14
4	Shoko Nakajima (c) defeated Delmi Exo by pinfall	Singles match for the MLW World Women's Featherweight Championship	11:04
5	The Bomaye Fight Club (Alex Kane and Mr. Thomas), Matthew Justice, and Paul London defeated The Rogue Horsemen (Bobby Fish, Brett Ryan Gosselin, Brock Anderson, and C. W. Anderson) by pinfall	War Chamber match	24:35
(c) / – the champion(s) heading into the match
