= Battle Riot VIII =

2026 Major League Wrestling event

- Promotional poster featuring various wrestlers
- Promotion: Major League Wrestling
- Date: January 29, 2026 (aired February 5, 2026 and May 30, 2026)
- City: Kissimmee, Florida
- Venue: Osceola Heritage Park Events Center
- Attendance: 700‒800

Event chronology
← Previous; MLW x Don Gato Tequila: Lucha de los Muertos	Next → Lucha Apocalypto

Battle Riot chronology
← Previous; VII	Next → —

Battle Riot VIII was a professional wrestling event produced by Major League Wrestling (MLW) that took place on January 29, 2026, at the Osceola Heritage Park Events Center in Kissimmee, Florida. As the name implies, it was the eighth event in the Battle Riot chronology. The event aired on tape delay on February 5 on BeIN Sports USA and streamed on MLW's YouTube channel.

Several matches were also taped for the new season of MLW Fusion, which premiered on May 30, 2026.

== Production ==
=== Background ===
Battle Riot is an annual event produced by Major League Wrestling that was first held in 2018 as a television taping for MLW Fusion. The event is named after the Battle Riot match, a multi-competitor match type in which wrestlers are eliminated until one is left and declared the winner. The match begins with two participants in the ring, who are then eliminated by either pin, submission, or going over the top rope and having both feet touch the venue floor. The declared winner of the Battle Riot match receives a "golden ticket", which they can redeem for a future MLW World Heavyweight Championship title shot anytime and anywhere; however, this year, the World Heavyweight Championship will be on the line in this Battle Riot.

On November 13, 2025, MLW announced that Battle Riot VIII would take place on January 29, 2026, at the Osceola Heritage Park Events Center in Kissimmee, Florida. On January 26, MLW announced that the event will air on tape delay on February 5.

=== Storylines ===
The card consisted of matches that result from scripted storylines, where wrestlers portrayed villains, heroes, or less distinguishable characters in scripted events that built tension and culminate in a wrestling match or series of matches, with results predetermined by MLW's writers. Storylines were played out at MLW events, and across the league's social media platforms.

Following an overwhelming response from fans online, MLW announced on January 19 that current MLW World Heavyweight Champion Mads Krule Krügger would defend his title in the Battle Riot match. This marks only the second consecutive time that the title would be on the line in the match.

== Results ==
No.	Results	Stipulations	Times
1^{FT}	Shotzi Blackheart defeated Priscilla Kelly by pinfall	Singles match (Fusion – May 30)	7:02
2^{FT}	Scarlett Bordeaux defeated Aleah James by pinfall	Singles match (Fusion – May 30)	2:52
3^{FT}	Austin Aries defeated Trevor Lee by pinfall	Singles match (Fusion – May 30)	15:08
4^{FT}	The Good Brothers (Doc Gallows and Karl Anderson) defeated The Coffey Brothers (Joe Coffey and Mark Coffey) (with Wolfgang) by pinfall	Tag team match (Fusion – May 30)	5:27
5^{FT}	Diego Hill defeated Adam Brooks by pinfall	Singles match (Fusion – May 30)	12:16
6^{FT}	Zamaya defeated Carolina Cruz by pinfall	Singles match (Fusion – May 30)	4:06
7^{FT}	Alex Hammerstone defeated Bishop Dyer by pinfall	Singles match (Fusion – May 30)	9:05
8	Kushida defeated Templario (c) by pinfall	Singles match for the MLW World Middleweight Championship	12:55
9	Killer Kross won by last eliminating Alex Hammerstone and Matt Riddle	40-man Battle Riot match for the MLW World Heavyweight Championship	1:07:15
(c) / – the champion(s) heading into the match; FT / – the match was taped for a future broadcast of Fusion

=== Battle Riot match entrances and eliminations ===
Draw	Entrant	Order	Eliminated by	Method of elimination	Elimination(s)
1	Killer Kross	–	Winner	–	7
2	Matt Riddle	39	Killer Kross	Over the top rope	4
3	Ben Bishop	1	Matt Riddle	Submission	0
4	Doc Gallows (Note: Gallows entered the match twice: once as himself and once under his old gimmick of Festus.)	2	Killer Kross	Over the top rope	0
5	Cha Cha Charlie	3	Mads Krule Krügger	Over the top rope	0
6	Joe Coffey	12	Matt Riddle	Over the top rope	1
7	Diego Hill	10	Mads Krule Krügger	Over the top rope	0
8	Mads Krule Krügger (c)	17	Sentai Death Squad	Over the top rope	5
9	Matthew Justice	4	Josh Bishop	Over the top rope, through a table	0
10	Paul Walter Hauser	7	Paul London	Pinfall	1
11	Josh Bishop	20	Killer Kross and Matt Riddle	Over the top rope	1
12	Paul London	9	Paul Walter Hauser (Note: Hauser had already been eliminated.)	Over the top rope	1
13	Anthony Greene	8	Joe Coffey	Over the top rope	0
14	Don Gato	6	Stallion Rogers	Over the top rope (Note: Rogers and Don Gato eliminated each other.)	1
15	Stallion Rogers	5	Don Gato	Over the top rope	1
16	Austin Aries	35	Alex Hammerstone	Over the top rope	3
17	Alan Angels	11	Cody Fluffman	Pinfall	0
18	Adam Brooks	26	Austin Aries	Over the top rope	0
19	Cody Fluffman	13	Trevor Lee	Over the top rope	1
20	Kushida	16	Mads Krule Krügger	Over the top rope	0
21	Trevor Lee	27	Austin Aries	Over the top rope	1
22	Ikuro Kwon	14	Mads Krule Krügger	Over the top rope	0
23	Wolfgang	21	Alex Hammerstone	Over the top rope	0
24	Babathunder (Note: The original #24 entrant was Davey Boy Smith Jr., but he was attacked by the Sentai Death Squad and replaced by Babathunder before he could compete.)	18	Himself	Over the top rope (Note: Babathunder and the Sentai Death Squad member eliminated themselves to attack Mads Krule Krügger)	0
25	Simon Gotch (Note: The original #25 entrant was Satoshi Kojima, but he was attacked by the Sentai Death Squad and replaced by Simon Gotch before he could compete.)	15	Mads Krule Krügger	Over the top rope	0
26	Sentai Death Squad	19	Himself	Over the top rope	1
27	Jesús Rodriguez	28	Matt Riddle	Over the top rope	0
28	Karl Anderson	23	Donovan Dijak	Over the top rope	0
29	Sidney Akeem	30	Alex Hammerstone	Over the top rope	0
30	Alex Hammerstone	38	Killer Kross	Over the top rope	6
31	Ricky Martinez	24	Festus	Over the top rope	0
32	Ariel Dominguez	22	Alex Hammerstone	Over the top rope	0
33	Festus	25	Alex Hammerstone	Over the top rope	1
34	Donovan Dijak	36	Killer Kross	Over the top rope	3
35	Bishop Dyer	37	Killer Kross	Over the top rope	2
36	LJ Cleary	29	Alex Hammerstone	Over the top rope	0
37	Madman Fulton	34	Donovan Dijak and Bishop Dyer	Over the top rope	0
38	Onix Caballero	31	Austin Aries	Over the top rope	0
39	Mr. Thomas	32	Donovan Dijak and Bishop Dyer	Over the top rope	0
40	Mark Coffey	33	Killer Kross	Over the top rope	0
