= Opera Cup (2025) =

2025 Major League Wrestling tournament

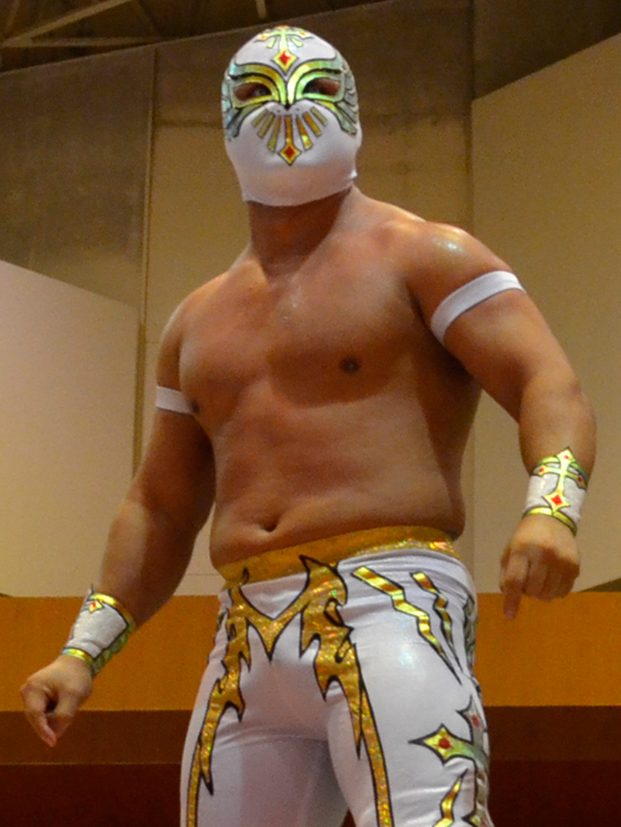
- The 2025 winner Místico
- Venue: First Round: Melrose Ballroom (June 26); NYTEX Sports Centre (September 13); Quarterfinals: Thunder Studios Arena (October 4); Semifinals: Thunder Studios Arena (October 4); Finals: Charleston Music Hall (November 20)
- Location: First Round: Queens, New York (June 26); North Richland Hills, Texas (September 13); Quarterfinals: Long Beach, California (October 4); Semifinals: Long Beach, California (October 4); Finals: Charleston, South Carolina (November 20)
- Start date: June 26, 2025
- End date: November 20, 2025
- Competitors: Anthony Greene; Austin Aries; Bishop Dyer; Blue Panther Jr.; Bobby Fish; Esfinge; Ikuro Kwon; Kushida; Okumura; Paul London; Satoshi Kojima; Star Jr. (alternate); Titán; Último Guerrero; Volador Jr.; Zandokan Jr.

Champion
- Místico

Opera Cup (2025) was the fifth Opera Cup professional wrestling tournament produced by Major League Wrestling (MLW). The first round started on June 26, 2025, at Summer of the Beasts, which aired on tape delay on August 9 as part of Blood and Thunder. The first round would continue on September 13 at Fightland and Fury Road, which aired on September 27. The quarterfinals and semifinals were held at Slaughterhouse and Symphony of Horrors, both of which took place on October 4; the latter show was taped and aired on October 25. The finals were held at MLW x Don Gato Tequila: Lucha de los Muertos on November 20.

== Production ==
=== Background ===
The Opera House Cup was annually held as a professional wrestling tournament for nearly fifty years in various cities in the United States until its discontinuation in 1948. Stu Hart won the final tournament and kept possession of the Opera Cup trophy since then. On July 21, 2019, Major League Wrestling announced that it would be holding an event on December 5 at the Melrose Ballroom in Queens, New York City, New York which would be a set of television tapings of MLW's television program Fusion. On July 24, it was reported that Stu Hart's grandson and MLW wrestler Teddy Hart would be donating an inherited "family heirloom" to MLW. On July 30, MLW.com announced that the family heirloom was Stu Hart's Opera Cup trophy and MLW would be bringing back the Opera Cup tournament on the December 5 supercard, naming it Opera Cup.

At Summer of the Beasts, the brackets for the Opera Cup were revealed, featuring sixteen participants, much like the previous year. The first round would be taped that same night and later aired on August 9 as part of Blood and Thunder.

== Results ==
First round (June 26, aired August 9)
No.	Results	Stipulations	Times
1	Bishop Dyer (with Saint Laurent) defeated Anthony Greene by pinfall	Singles match	7:43
2	Satoshi Kojima defeated Bobby Fish by pinfall	Singles match	8:50
3	Místico defeated Ikuro Kwon by pinfall	Singles match	7:47

First round (September 13)
No.	Results	Stipulations	Times
1	Último Guerrero defeated Esfinge by pinfall	Singles match	11:05
2	Zandokan Jr. (with El Galeón Fantasma (Barboza and Difunto)) defeated Blue Panther Jr. by pinfall	Singles match	6:11

First round (September 13, aired September 27)
No.	Results	Stipulations	Times
1	Paul London defeated Okumura (with Satoshi Kojima)	Singles match	4:29
2	Volador Jr. defeated Titán by pinfall	Singles match	15:57
3	Austin Aries defeated Kushida by pinfall	Singles match	12:28

Quarterfinals (October 4)
No.	Results	Stipulations	Times
1	Volador Jr. (with Magnus and Rugido) defeated Star Jr. by pinfall	Singles match	6:21
2	Satoshi Kojima (with Okumura) defeated Bishop Dyer (with Donovan Dijak) by pinfall	Singles match	11:06
3	Austin Aries defeated Paul London by pinfall	Singles match	9:07
4	Místico defeated Último Guerrero by submission	Singles match	10:11

Semifinals (October 4, aired October 25)
No.	Results	Stipulations	Times
1	Volador Jr. (with Los Depredadores (Magnus and Rugido)) defeated Satoshi Kojima (with Okumura) by pinfall	Singles match	6:53
2	Místico defeated Austin Aries by pinfall	Singles match	15:57

Finals (November 20)
No.	Results	Stipulations	Times
1	Místico defeated Volador Jr. by submission	Singles match	10:53

== Tournament brackets ==
First round Blood and Thunder (August 9); Fightland (September 13); Fury Road (September 27)
Místico	Pin
Ikuro Kwon	7:47
Último Guerrero	Pin
Esfinge	11:05
Austin Aries	Pin
Kushida	12:28
Paul London	Pin
Okumura	4:29
Volador Jr.	Pin
Titán	15:57
Blue Panther Jr.	6:11
Zandokan Jr.^{1}	Pin
Satoshi Kojima	Pin
Bobby Fish	8:50
Bishop Dyer	Pin
Anthony Greene	7:43

Quarterfinals; Slaughterhouse (October 4)
Místico	Sub
Último Guerrero	10:11
Austin Aries	Pin
Paul London	9:07
Volador Jr.	Pin
Star Jr.^{1}	6:21
Satoshi Kojima	Pin
Bishop Dyer	11:06

Semifinals; Symphony of Horrors (October 25)
Místico	Pin
Austin Aries	15:57
Volador Jr.	Pin
Satoshi Kojima	6:53

Final; MLW x Don Gato Tequila: Lucha de los Muertos (November 20)
Místico	Sub
Volador Jr.	10:53

1 Zandokan Jr. was forced to withdraw due to a knee injury, so as an alternate, Star Jr. took his place.
