= Slaughterhouse (2025) =

2025 Major League Wrestling event

- Promotion: Major League Wrestling
- Date: October 4, 2025
- City: Long Beach, California
- Venue: Thunder Studios Arena

Event chronology
← Previous; Fightland	Next → MLW x Don Gato Tequila: Lucha de los Muertos

Slaughterhouse chronology
← Previous; 2024	Next → 2026

Slaughterhouse (2025) was a professional wrestling event produced by Major League Wrestling (MLW) that took place on October 4, 2025, at the Thunder Studios Arena in Long Beach, California. It was the third event in the Slaughterhouse chronology. The event aired live on BeIN Sports USA and streamed live on MLW's YouTube channel.

Additional matches were taped for "Symphony of Horrors", which aired as a television special on October 25 on BeIN Sports USA and YouTube.

== Production ==
=== Background ===
Slaugherhouse is an event produced by Major League Wrestling (MLW) that was first held in 2023. Its name originated from a 2019 special episode of the promotion's television series, MLW Fusion, called "Jimmy Havoc's Slaughterhouse".

On April 15, 2025, MLW announced that a third Slaughterhouse event would take place on October 4, 2025, at Thunder Studios Arena in Long Beach, California.

=== Storylines ===
The card consisted of matches that result from scripted storylines, where wrestlers portrayed villains, heroes, or less distinguishable characters in scripted events that built tension and culminate in a wrestling match or series of matches, with results predetermined by MLW's writers. Storylines were played out at MLW events, and across the league's social media platforms.

== Results ==
Slaughterhouse
No.	Results	Stipulations	Times
1	Mads Krule Krügger (c) defeated CW Anderson, Matthew Justice, Mr. Thomas, Chris Adonis, and Brock Anderson	Chamber of Horrors match for the MLW World Heavyweight Championship	5:22
2	Volador Jr. (with Los Depredadores (Magnus and Rugido)) defeated Star Jr. by pinfall	2025 Opera Cup quarterfinal match	6:21
3	Satoshi Kojima (with Okumura) defeated Bishop Dyer by pinfall	2025 Opera Cup quarterfinal match	11:06
4	Austin Aries defeated Paul London by pinfall	2025 Opera Cup quarterfinal match	9:07
5	Matt Riddle defeated Alex Hammerstone by pinfall	Singles match	12:03
6	Shoko Nakajima (c) defeated Himawari by pinfall	Singles match for the MLW World Women's Featherweight Championship	12:22
7	Místico defeated Último Guerrero by submission	2025 Opera Cup quarterfinal match	10:22
(c) / – the champion(s) heading into the match

Symphony of Horrors (October 25)
No.	Results	Stipulations	Times
1	Blue Panther (c) defeated Atlantis and Rugido by pinfall	Three-way match for the MLW National Openweight Championship	7:36
2	Shotzi Blackheart defeated Brittnie Brooks by pinfall	Lightning match	7:15
3	Diego Hill defeated Ikuro Kwon, Magnus, Okumura, and Stigma by pinfall	Five-way Scramble match	5:27
4	Mads Krule Krügger and Matt Riddle defeated The Skyscrapers (Bishop Dyer and Donovan Dijak) (c) by disqualification	Tag team match for the MLW World Tag Team Championship	1:42
5	Templario (c) defeated Virus by pinfall	Singles match for the MLW World Middleweight Championship	9:11
6	Volador Jr. (with Los Depredadores (Magnus and Rugido)) defeated Satoshi Kojima (with Okumura) by pinfall	2025 Opera Cup semifinal match	6:53
7	Místico defeated Austin Aries by pinfall	2025 Opera Cup semifinal match	15:57
(c) / – the champion(s) heading into the match
