= Fightland (2025) =

2025 Major League Wrestling event

- Promotional poster
- Promotion: Major League Wrestling
- Date: September 13, 2025
- City: North Richland Hills, Texas
- Venue: NYTEX Sports Centre
- Attendance: 2,400

Event chronology
← Previous; Summer of the Beasts	Next → Slaughterhouse

Fightland chronology
← Previous; 2024	Next → 2026

Fightland (2025) was a professional wrestling livestreaming event produced by Major League Wrestling (MLW) that took place on September 13, 2025, at the NYTEX Sports Centre in North Richland Hills, Texas. It was the seventh event in the Fightland chronology. The event aired live on BeIN Sports USA and stream live on MLW's YouTube channel.

Additional matches were taped for Fury Road, which aired as a television special on September 27 on BeIN Sports USA and YouTube.

== Production ==
=== Background ===
Fightland is a recurring event produced by Major League Wrestling (MLW) that was first held in 2018 as a television taping for MLW's weekly program, MLW Fusion.

On January 9, 2025, MLW announced that Fightland would take place on September 13, 2025, at the NYTEX Sports Centre in North Richland Hills, Texas.

=== Storylines ===
The card consisted of matches that result from scripted storylines, where wrestlers portray villains, heroes, or less distinguishable characters in scripted events that built tension and culminate in a wrestling match or series of matches, with results predetermined by MLW's writers. Storylines are played out at MLW events and across the league's social media platforms.

Matt Riddle and Donovan Dijak have been embroiled in a feud stemming back One Shot, when Riddle defeated Dijak to defend his Battle Riot "Golden Ticket" for an MLW World Heavyweight Championship match. Riddle would go on to become champion at Kings of Colosseum, later crossing paths again with Dijak at Battle Riot VII in the titular match, in which Riddle was defending his title. The two men were part of the final three before Riddle eliminated Dijak and later Rob Van Dam to win and retain his title. The two met again for the title in a singles match the following month at Azteca Lucha, which Riddle would win again. A third match between the two was supposed to take place at Blood and Thunder, but it never started as Riddle was attacked by Mads Krule Krügger backstage. Frustrated, Dijak's manager Saint Laurent confronted MLW President Cesar Duran and Vice President of Wrestling Relations Salina de la Renta backstage about Dijak's opportunity. Duran would then have the title match between Riddle and Dijak set for Fightland.

At Battle Riot VII, Místico was meant to defend the MLW World Middleweight Championship against Templario, but due to Místico suffering a triceps injury, the match was held off. During the event, Místico was interviewed on the stage, where, due to the nature of his injury as well as his desire to move to the heavyweight division, he would relinquish the title. However, just as he was handing the title belt to Cesar Duran, Contra Unit's Ikuro Kwon would ambush Místico, spray black mist in the face of Duran, and steal the belt. This soon led to a three-way match at Azteca Lucha between Místico, Templario, and Kwon, which Místico won. Soon after the match, though, an irate Kwon again attacked Místico, this time stealing his mask Kwon, now branding himself "The Lucha Hunter," vowed to put down any luchador that came into MLW as he continued to parade around with the title belt, despite not being the official champion. At Blood and Thunder, MLW announced that Kwon and Templario would face off for the vacant MLW World Middleweight Championship at Fightland.

At Summer of the Beasts, Último Guerrero was set to defend the MLW National Openweight Championship against Alex Hammerstone. However, Matthew Justice, the man Guerrero beat for the title, came out and declared that, since he never had his rematch, Cesar Duran had inserted Justice into the match. Guerrero would still retain his title, though, pinning Justice to win. This soon led to a confrontation between Hammerstone and Justice, which later turned into a massive brawl. Both men continued to attack each other verbally following the event, with Hammerstone mocking Justice's wrestling style, while Justice berated Hammerstone for leaving MLW a year prior. At Blood and Thunder, it was announced that the two men would battle in a Texas Deathmatch at Fightland.

At Blood and Thunder, Cesar Duran and Salina de la Renta received a collection of keys and a bottle of "Don Gato" tequila. Duran took it as an invitation to see Don Gato himself, as he and de la Renta began to prepare for their meeting. In a set of vignettes during the show, actor Danny McBride was seen in Don Gato's mansion, explaining the origin of Don Gato to a friend of his. Supposedly a famous luchador, Don Gato stepped away from competition following his mentor's death. During a trip to Las Vegas, Don Gato was "inspired" by the complimentary tequila being served in the casinos, and after winning it big, returned to Mexico and started his tequila business. On September 8, MLW announced that Don Gato himself would appear live at Fightland.

==== Opera Cup ====
Several matches were also announced for Fightland as part of the first round in the 2025 Opera Cup. The first match was announced on August 18, between Consejo Mundial de Lucha Libre wrestlers Volador Jr. and Titán, the former making his MLW debut. Two days later on August 20, Austin Aries, who had been serving as color commentator since Battle Riot VII, was announced to return to in-ring competition as he would face Kushida as part of the TV taping portion. On August 25, MLW National Openweight Champion Último Guerrero was announced to face Esfinge in the first round on the taping portion. Three days later, Blue Panther Jr. and Zandokan Jr. were announced for the first round on the main card. On September 9, the final first round match was announced for the taping portion, as Paul London would face Okumura.

== Results ==
Fightland
No.	Results	Stipulations	Times
1	Último Guerrero defeated Esfinge by pinfall	2025 Opera Cup tournament first round match	11:05
2	Zandokan Jr. (with El Galeón Fantasma (Barboza and Difunto)) defeated Blue Panther Jr. by pinfall	2025 Opera Cup tournament first round match	6:11
3	Shoko Nakajima (c) defeated Yuki Kamifuku by pinfall	Singles match for the MLW World Women's Featherweight Championship	9:46
4	Alex Hammerstone defeated Matthew Justice by pinfall	Texas Deathmatch	16:21
5	Templario defeated Ikuro Kwon (with Sentai Death Squad) by pinfall	Singles match for the vacant MLW World Middleweight Championship	6:14
6	Mads Krule Krügger defeated Matt Riddle (c) and Donovan Dijak (with Saint Laurent) by pinfall	Three-way match for the MLW World Heavyweight Championship (Note: The match was originally started between Riddle and Dijak until Krügger came out and cashed-in his Gravity Gramble contract and turned the match into a three-way match.); This was Krügger's "Gravity Gramble" cash-in match.	13:13
(c) / – the champion(s) heading into the match

Fury Road (September 27)
No.	Results	Stipulations	Times
1	Atlantis, Blue Panther, and Diego Hill defeated El Galeón Fantasma (Zandokan Jr., Barboza, and Difunto) by pinfall	Trios match	15:11
2	Paul London defeated Okumura (with Satoshi Kojima) by pinfall	2025 Opera Cup tournament first round match	4:29
3	Volador Jr. defeated Titán by pinfall	2025 Opera Cup tournament first round match	15:57
4	Shotzi Blackheart defeated Alejandra Quintanilla by pinfall	Singles match	6:43
5	Satoshi Kojima (with Okumura) defeated Mr. Thomas by pinfall	Lightning match	4:33
6	Austin Aries defeated Kushida by pinfall	2025 Opera Cup tournament first round match	12:28
