= Summer of the Beasts (2025) =

2025 Major League Wrestling event

- Promotional poster
- Promotion: Major League Wrestling
- Date: June 26, 2025
- City: Queens, New York
- Venue: Melrose Ballroom
- Attendance: 500

Event chronology
← Previous; Azteca Lucha	Next → Fightland

Summer of the Beasts chronology
← Previous; 2024	Next → 2026

Summer of the Beasts (2025) was a professional wrestling event produced by Major League Wrestling (MLW) that took place on June 26, 2025, at the Melrose Ballroom in Queens, New York. It was the second event in the Summer of the Beasts chronology. The event aired live on BeIN Sports USA (the first time MLW aired live on television since 2019) and streamed live on MLW's YouTube channel.

Additional matches were taped for Blood and Thunder, which aired as a TV special on August 9 on BeIN Sports USA and YouTube.

== Production ==
=== Background ===
Summer of the Beasts is a professional wrestling supercard event produced by Major League Wrestling. The first event was broadcast on August 29, 2024.

On February 2, 2025, MLW announced that the second edition of the Summer of the Beasts would take place on June 26, 2025, at the Melrose Ballroom in Queens, New York.

=== Storylines ===
The card consisted of matches that result from scripted storylines, where wrestlers portray villains, heroes, or less distinguishable characters in scripted events that built tension and culminate in a wrestling match or series of matches, with results predetermined by MLW's writers. Storylines are played out across the league's social media platforms.

== Results ==
Summer of the Beasts
No.	Results	Stipulations	Times
1	The Skyscrapers (Donovan Dijak and Bishop Dyer) (with Saint Laurent) defeated Los Depredadores (Magnus and Rugido) (c) by pinfall	Tag team match for the MLW World Tag Team Championship	9:06
2	Brock Anderson defeated Anthony Greene by pinfall	Singles match	7:53
3	Yuki Kamifuku defeated Wakana Uehara by pinfall	Singles match	7:11
4	Kushida defeated Diego "Divebomb" Hill by pinfall	Singles match	9:03
5	Último Guerrero (c) defeated Alex Hammerstone and Matthew Justice by pinfall	Three-way match for the MLW National Openweight Championship	8:34
6	Matt Riddle (c) defeated Kenta by pinfall	Singles match for the MLW World Heavyweight Championship	17:18
(c) / – the champion(s) heading into the match

Blood and Thunder (August 9)
No.	Results	Stipulations	Times
1	Mads Krule Krügger defeated Ariel Dominguez, C. W. Anderson, Matthew Justice, Mr. Thomas (with Faye Jackson), and Okumura by pinfall	Six-way scramble match	5:06
2	Neón vs. Paul London ended in a time-limit draw	Lightning match	10:00
3	Bishop Dyer (with Saint Laurent) defeated Anthony Greene by pinfall	2025 Opera Cup Tournament first round match	7:43
4	Satoshi Kojima defeated Bobby Fish by pinfall	2025 Opera Cup Tournament first round match	8:50
5	Shotzi Blackheart defeated Ava Everett by submission	Singles match	8:14
6	Místico defeated Ikuro Kwon by pinfall	2025 Opera Cup Tournament first round match	7:47
