= Star Jr. =

Mexican pro wrestler (b. 1993)

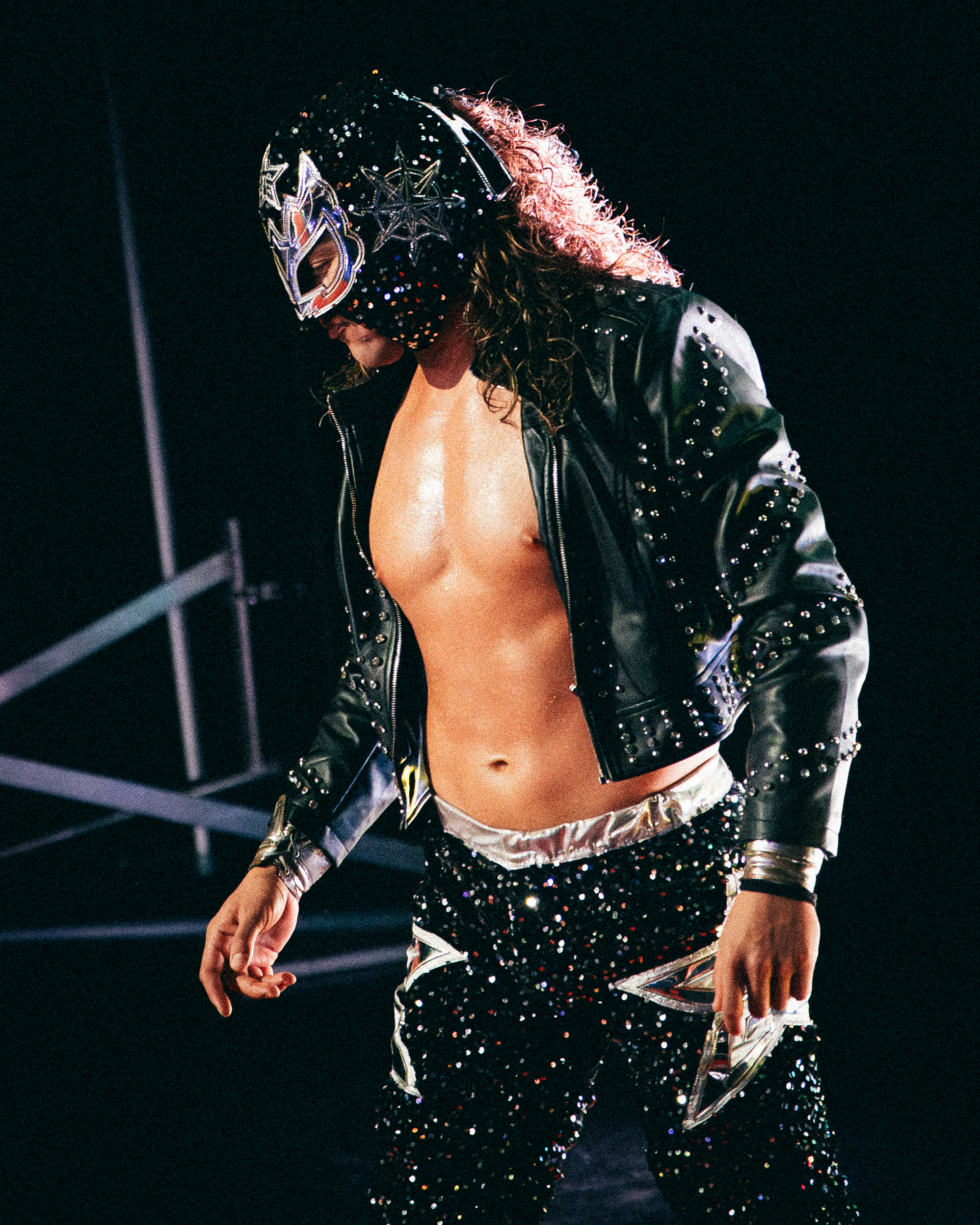
- Star Jr. in April 2025

Personal information
- Born: Isaías Hernández López; November 15, 1993 (age 32) Mexico City, Mexico
- Family: Isaías Hernández Muñoz (Father)

Professional wrestling career
- Ring name(s): Apolo Múñoz; Tigre Mágico II; Star Boy Jr. Star Jr.
- Billed height: 180 cm (5 ft 11 in)
- Billed weight: 85 kg (187 lb)
- Trained by: Dr. Cerebro; Franco Colombo; Star Boy; Tigre Mágico; Tony Rivera; Virus
- Debut: August 15, 2010

Isaías Hernández López (born November 15, 1993), best known by his ring name Star Jr., is a Mexican professional wrestler signed to Consejo Mundial de Lucha Libre (CMLL).

Star Jr. is a second-generation wrestler, being the son of Isaías Hernández Muñoz, better known under the ring name Star Boy. Prior to joining CMLL, he worked under the ring names Star Boy Jr., Apolo Múñoz (after his father) and Tigre Mágico II (after one of his trainers). He is a two-time CMLL World Trios Champion and won the 2019 Torneo Gran Alternativa and 2024 La Copa Junior VIP tournaments. He has also wrestled in the United States for Major League Wrestling (MLW) and All Elite Wrestling (AEW), and in Japan for New Japan Pro-Wrestling (NJPW).

== Early life ==
Isaías Hernández López was born in Mexico City on November 15, 1993, the son of professional wrestler Isaías Hernández Muñoz, who worked under the ring name Star Boy. His identity was previously not a matter of public record, a tradition in Mexico where the private lives of masked wrestlers are kept a secret from the wrestling fans.

== Professional wrestling career ==
=== Early career (2010–2014) ===
The wrestler later known as Star Jr. made his in-ring debut on August 15, 2010, revealing in interviews that he used the ring names Apolo Múñoz, a tribute to his father Isaías Hernández Muñoz, and Tigre Mágico II, which he used while teaming with trainer Tigre Mágico. By 2012, he was known as Star Boy Jr., inspired by his father's ring name, "Star Boy".

Star Boy Jr. debuted for International Wrestling Revolution Group (IWRG) on March 18, representing trainer Tony Rivera's team in the Copa Higher Power tournament and defeating "Gym IWRG". At Guerra del Golfo ("Gulf War") on April 15, he and Galaxy lost to Guerrero Mixtico Jr. and Matrix Jr. after Galaxy dislocated his shoulder, forcing the match to end early. Afterward, Star Boy Jr. wrestled in the second match of the night as a replacement for Tritón; he and Chicano defeated Pacto Negro and The Mummy. Two days later, Star Boy Jr. was one of sixteen wrestlers risking their mask or hair on the outcome of a steel cage Lucha de Apuestas ("bet match") as part of a high-profile storyline feud between "Gym Rivera" and '"Gym IWRG"; he escaped the cage, keeping his mask safe. On May 6, he and Sauroman lost to Alan Extreme and Polifacetico at Caravana de Campeones ("Carnival of Champions").

=== Consejo Mundial de Lucha Libre (2014–present) ===
Star Boy Jr., under the shortened ring name "Star Jr.", made his Consejo Mundial de Lucha Libre (CMLL) debut on January 6, 2014, teaming with Robin and Meyer to defeat El Rebelde, Espíritu Maligno and King Jaguar. On February 7, Star Jr. was one of 14 "rookies" paired with a veteran for the Torneo Gran Alternativa ("Great Alternative Tournament"), where he and Atlantis lost to Hechicero and Último Guerrero in the first round. On March 25, Star Jr., alongside Cachorro, Cavernario, Dragon Lee, Guerrero Negro Jr., Hechicero, Soberano Jr. and Super Halcón Jr., won a torneo cibernetico elimination match to qualify for that year's En Busca de un Ídolo ("In Search of an Idol") tournament. The first round consisted of a round-robin tournament where he wrestled against all other participants, after which each wrestler was given points by a panel of judges and from an online poll. Star Jr. was eliminated from the tournament with 406 points, ranking in fifth place overall. Following this, Star Jr. formed the tag team Los Principes del Ring ("The Princes of the Ring") with Soberano Jr., being involved in a feud with veteran wrestlers Cholo and Ramstein that led to a Lucha de Apuestas on January 6, 2015, where the losers were forced to unmask and reveal their real names. Star Jr. and Soberano Jr. defeated Cholo and Ramstein, both of whom abided to the stipulation. Three months later, Star Jr. broke the middle finger on his right hand during a match, sidelining him for three months; he and Soberano Jr.'s team name was tweaked during this time to Los Principes Azules ("The Blue Princes").

Star Jr. sought to qualify for the La Copa Junior ("The Junior Cup") tournament on April 21, 2017. Despite eliminating Artillero in his block's battle royal, he was eliminated by Sansón. He was paired with Místico for the Torneo Gran Alternativa on June 2, losing to Blue Panther and Pegasso in the first round. On December 24, in the main event of Sin Salida ("No Escape"), Star Jr. was involved in a multi-man steel cage match where the loser would be forced to unmask, successfully escaping the cage. On February 24, 2018, Star Jr. and Fuego participated in a tournament for the CMLL Arena Coliseo Tag Team Championship, defeating Akuma and Templario in the first round before losing to La Dinastia Casas (Puma and Tiger) in the quarter-finals. At Homenaje a Dos Leyendas ("Homage to Two Legends") on March 16, Star Jr., Audaz and Flyer defeated Disturbio, Templario and Virus. For that year's Torneo Gran Alternativa on May 11, he and Carístico defeated Cavernario and El Coyote in the first round and Akuma and Euforia in the quarter-finals, but lost to Templario and Último Guerrero in the semi-finals. The following year's edition of the tournament on October 11, 2019, saw Star Jr. and Valiente defeat Akuma and Euforia, Furia Roja and Gran Guerrero and Cavernario and Espanto Jr. to advance to the finals. The following week, they defeated Fugaz and Místico to win the tournament. Later that month, Star Jr. outlasted Audaz, Black Panther, Disturbio, Dulce Gardenia, Pólvora, Rey Cometa, Universo 2000 Jr., Virus and Tiger to become the number one contender for the Rey del Inframundo ("King of the Underworld") championship, which he failed to win from Sansón on November 1 at Día de Muertos ("Day of the Dead'). On December 1, Star Jr. eliminated Fuego and Negro Casas in a torneo cibernetico to determine the challengers for the CMLL World Welterweight Championship, before being the last wrestler eliminated by Titán.

Star Jr. in July 2020

At Sin Piedad ("No Mercy") on January 1, 2020, Star Jr., Audaz and Cometa defeated El Felino, Hechicero and Mephisto. He participated in the Reyes del Aire ("Kings of the Air") tournament two weeks later, eliminating Virus before being lastly eliminated by Templario. On March 6, he was paired with Cometa in a tournament for the Mexican National Tag Team Championship, defeating Pólvora and Vangellys in the first round before losing to Atlantis Jr. and Flyer in the quarter-finals. In early 2021, Star Jr., Guerrero Maya Jr. and Stuka Jr. participated in a tournament for the Mexican National Trios Championship, defeating Black Panther, Blue Panther and Blue Panther Jr. and Ephesto, Luciferno and Mephisto en route to the finals, losing to Cancerbero, Raziel and Virus on April 24. On July 16, he lost to Mephisto in the first round of the Leyenda de Plata ("The Silver Legend") tournament. Star Jr. unsuccessfully challenged the trio for the title on July 18 and August 10 alongside Dark Panther and Esfinge and Fugaz and Stuka Jr. respectively, as well as Templario for the Mexican National Middleweight Championship on November 23. On December 3, he lost to Dragón Rojo Jr. in the quarter-finals of a tournament for the CMLL World Middleweight Championship. On June 14, 2022, he and Guerrero Maya Jr. failed to win the CMLL World Tag Team Championship from Los Hermanos Chavez (Ángel de Oro and Niebla Roja). At the CMLL 89th Anniversary Show on September 16, he, Casas and Titán lost to Los Infernales (Euforia, Hechicero and Mephisto). Star Jr. suffered a torn anterior cruciate ligament in November and was sidelined for six months, returning on May 19, 2023.

Star Jr. won his first championship on June 2, as he, Atlantis Jr. and Volador Jr. defeated Los Infernales for the CMLL World Trios Championship. On August 22, he and Volador Jr. failed to win the title of Los Hermanos Chavez. His partner for the Torneo Gran Alternativa on January 19, 2024 was Ángel Rebelde, losing to Crixus and Euforia in the first round. On February 5, his team lost their title to Los Barbaros (Cavernario, Dragón Rojo Jr. and El Terrible). The next night, he competed in the Reyes del Aire, but was eliminated by Templario. On May 17, Star Jr. outlasted Averno, Brillante Jr., Dragón Rojo Jr., El Hijo de Octagón, Guerrero Maya Jr., Roja, Soberano Jr., Villano III Jr. and Volador Jr. to advance to the finals of the La Copa Junior VIP ("The Junior VIP Cup") tournament, which he won by defeating Ángel de Oro on May 31. On July 16, Star Jr. won his second CMLL World Trios Championship as he, Máscara Dorada and Neón defeated Los Barbaros. Three days later, he entered the Leyenda de Plata, defeating Magia Blanca in the first round, Templario in the quarter-finals and Místico in the semi-finals, but lost to Ángel de Oro in the finals on July 26. He competed in the semi-final torneo cibernetico of the Copa Independencia ("Independence Cup") tournament on September 6, eliminating Crixus before being eliminated by Titán. At the CMLL 91st Anniversary Show on September 13, Star Jr., Neón and Templario lost to Los Hermanos Chavez and Soberano Jr. At Noche de Campeones ("Night of Champions") on September 27, he, Dorada and Neón lost the title to Los Infernales.

By early 2025, Star Jr. developed a rivalry with Zandokan Jr. At Homenaje a Dos Leyendas on March 21, they defeated Esfinge and Valiente in a Relevos Suicidas ("Suicide Relays") match to advance to a mask vs. mask Lucha de Apuestas in the main event, where Star Jr. lost to Zandokan Jr., thus being forced to unmask and reveal his real name, Isaías Hernández López. He was the first wrestler eliminated by Zandokan Jr. in the semi-final torneo cibernetico of that year's La Copa Junior VIP on May 23. In the following year's edition on May 22, 2026, he was eliminated mid-way through by Ángel de Oro.

=== New Japan Pro-Wrestling (2018) ===
On October 19, 2017, Star Jr. was announced to make his debut in Japan in January 2018 by participating in the eight-night Fantastica Mania 2018 tour, co-promoted by CMLL and New Japan Pro-Wrestling (NJPW).

=== All Elite Wrestling (2024) ===
Star Jr. appeared for All Elite Wrestling (AEW) on the February 7, 2024 episode of Dynamite, sitting in the crowd during the six-man tag team match between Blackpool Combat Club (Bryan Danielson, Claudio Castagnoli and Jon Moxley) and Hechicero, Máscara Dorada and Volador Jr. He made his in-ring debut three nights later on Collision, where he and Esfinge lost to Castagnoli and Moxley.

=== Major League Wrestling (2024–2025) ===
Star Jr. made his debut for Major League Wrestling (MLW) on February 29, 2024, defeating Magnus. At Azteca Lucha on May 11, he and Fuego lost to Averno and Magnus. At Battle Riot VI on June 1, he participated in the 40-man Battle Riot match, eliminating Jimmy Yang and Místico before being eliminated by Josh Bishop and Tom Lawlor. That same night, during the tapings for MLW's 24th anniversary show (which aired on June 22), Star Jr. unsuccessfully challenged Místico for the MLW World Middleweight Championship. On April 5, 2025, at Battle Riot VII, he again failed to win the titular match for the MLW World Heavyweight Championship. Star Jr. replaced an injured Zandokan Jr. in his Opera Cup quarter-final match at Slaughterhouse on October 4, but was defeated by Volador Jr.

== Championships and accomplishments ==
- Consejo Mundial de Lucha Libre
  - CMLL World Trios Championship (2 times) – with Atlantis Jr. and Volador Jr. (1), Máscara Dorada and Neón (1)
  - Torneo Gran Alternativa (2019) – with Valiente
  - La Copa Junior VIP (2024)

== Luchas de Apuestas record ==
| Winner (wager) | Loser (wager) | Location | Event | Date | Notes |
|---|---|---|---|---|---|
| Los Principes del Ring (masks) (Star Jr. and Soberano Jr.) | Cholo and Ramstein (masks) | Mexico City | CMLL Martes de Arena Mexico | January 6, 2015 | |
| Zandokan Jr. (mask) | Star Jr. (mask) | Mexico City | Homenaje a Dos Leyendas | March 21, 2025 | |
