= Templario =

Mexican professional wrestler (born 1992)

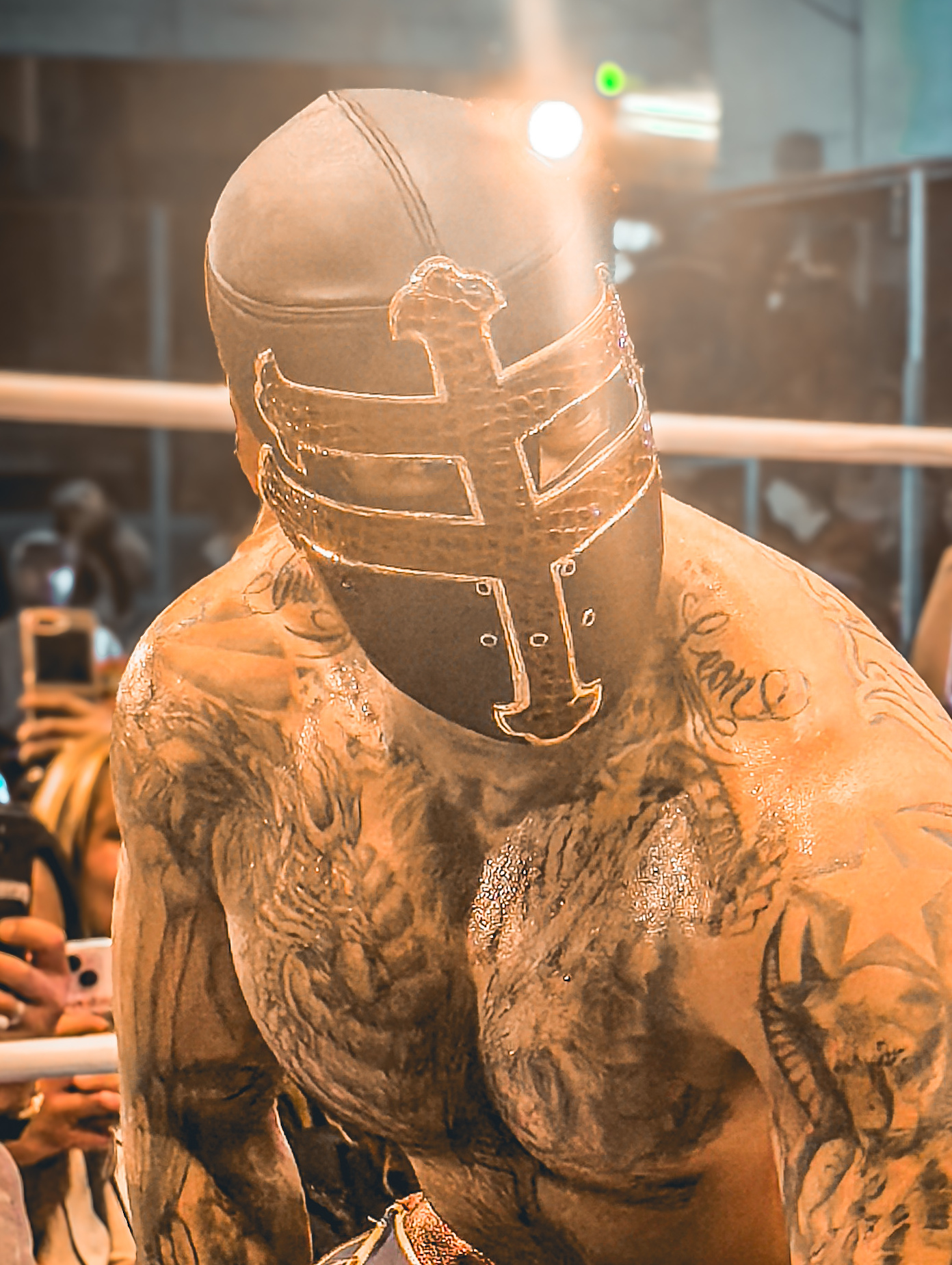
- Templario in February 2026

Personal information
- Born: Unrevealed (Note: Traditionally Mexican sources will not report on the birth name of a masked wrestler who has never been unmasked in the ring.); February 27, 1992 (age 34) Calpulalpan, Tlaxcala, Mexico
- Website: Facebook

Professional wrestling career
- Billed height: 1.73 m (5 ft 8 in)
- Billed weight: 98 kg (216 lb)
- Trained by: Último Guerrero
- Debut: 2009

Templario (born February 27, 1992) is a Mexican professional wrestler signed to Consejo Mundial de Lucha Libre (CMLL), where he is the current CMLL World Middleweight Champion in his first reign. He also makes appearances for partner promotions Major League Wrestling (MLW), where he is the current MLW World Middleweight Champion in his second reign, and New Japan Pro-Wrestling (NJPW), where is a member of the United Empire. Templario's real name has not been revealed, nor reported on, which is a tradition in lucha libre when a wrestler has not been unmasked.

It is uncertain exactly when Templario made his professional wrestling career and if he has used a different ring name before adopting the "Templario" persona around 2012 or 2013. Prior to joining CMLL in early 2016, he wrestled on the Mexican independent circuit. Templario is a one-time Mexican National Middleweight Champion. He has also won the 2020 Reyes del Aire tournament, the 2023 Universal Championship, the 2021 Torneo Nacional de Parejas Increibles with Volador Jr., and the December 2024 Torneo Gran Alternativa with Legendario.

== Professional wrestling career ==
Several professional wrestlers have used the ring name "Templario" (Spanish for "Knights Templar") in Mexico over the years. Due to multiple wrestlers using the same name, it makes it difficult to pinpoint exactly when he made his in-ring debut. His earliest recorded match is believed to be at an NWA Mexico show on April 19, 2009, against a wrestler named Odiseo.

Templario wanted to be a professional wrestler from a young age, something that both his family and friends encouraged him to pursue. Initially, he looked for opportunities in his native Calpulalpan, and then later traveled to Pachuca but was unsuccessful in both places. He ended up traveling to Mexico City, where he began a friendship with Último Guerrero who both helped train him and get contacts for his first match. On July 23, 2010, Templario unsuccessfully challenged Turbo for the NWA Mexico Lightweight Championship. By 2012, Templario began working on a regular basis, primarily in Mexico City and the surrounding federal district. On September 17, 2012, he competed in a Reyes del Aire ("King of the Air") tournament, won by Camaleón. In December 2012, Templario competed for the Trofeo Último Guerrero in honor of his trainer and friend. The 10-man torneo cibernetico elimination match was won by Eddy Vega.

=== Consejo Mundial de Lucha Libre (2016–present) ===
A Cross of Lorraine symbol, similar to that on Templario's mask

==== Early years (2016–2018) ====
Templario made his initial appearance for Consejo Mundial de Lucha Libre (CMLL) on July 10, 2016, where he, Flyer and Pegasso lost to Forastero, Maquiavelo, and Skándalo at a show in Arena México. After joining CMLL, Templario changed his mask design to include a patriarchal cross symbol on the front of his mask. Wrestlers under a CMLL contract are allowed to work on the independent circuit on days when CMLL does not require them to participate in a show, which allowed Templario to work for Promociones Cara Lucha on a regular basis. He defeated Andy Boy, Toro Negro Jr. and Látigo in a one-night tournament to become the inaugural Cara Lucha The Best Champion. The following month, Templario teamed up with one of his CMLL trainers, Último Guerrero, for Cara Lucha's Torneo Juventud y Gloria ("Youth and Glory tournament"), where they defeated Fly Warrior and Hechicero in the first round and Latigo and Trauma I in the semi-finals. (Note: No records of the tournament final have been found, it is uncertain if it was actually held.)

On December 25, 2017, in the main event of the Sin Salida ("No Escape") supercard, Templario was involved in a multi-man steel cage match where the loser would be forced to unmask. He was the seventh man to escape the cage, watching from the outside as Starman defeated and unmasked El Hijo del Signo. In February 2018, Templario teamed up with Akuma to compete in a tournament for the vacant CMLL Arena Coliseo Tag Team Championship, but they were eliminated in the first round by Fuego and Star Jr. He, Disturbio and Virus lost to Audaz, Flyer and Star Jr. at Homenaje a Dos Leyendas ("Homage to Two Legends") on March 16. On May 18, Templario was entered into the Gran Alternativa ("Great Alternative") tournament, where a rookie wrestler is paired with a veteran wrestler for a 16-team tournament. Templario teamed up with Último Guerrero and fought their way to the finals by defeating Máscara Año 2000 and Universo 2000 Jr., Audaz and Kraneo, and finally Carístico and Star Jr. The following week, the team lost in the finals to Flyer and Volador Jr.

==== Los Guerreros Laguneros (2018–2022) ====
Templario was brought in as a replacement for Soberano Jr. for the Blue Panther 40th Anniversary Show by Último Guerrero. After the show, he joined Guerrero's group, Los Guerreros Laguneros ("The Warriors of the Lagoon"; Guerrero, Euforia and Gran Guerrero), as their fourth member. On October 26, Templario won a torneo cibernético over Audaz, Black Panther, El Cuatrero, Esfinge, Flyer, Forastero, Guerrero Maya Jr., Kawato-San, Tritón, Virus and Tiger to earn a match for the Rey del Inframundo ("King of the Underworld") championship, which he lost to Sansón at Día de Muertos ("Day of the Dead") on November 2. On November 16, Templario competed in the Leyenda de Plata ("Silver Legend") tournament, but was the tenth wrestler eliminated after being pinned by Volador Jr. At Sin Piedad ("No Mercy") on January 1, 2019, Templario, Cuatrero and Forastero lost to Dragon Lee, Penta 0M and King Phoenix. Five days later, he competed in the Reyes del Aire ("King of the Air") tournament for the first time, but was the fifteenth and last competitor to be eliminated by Titán. On March 15, at Homenaje a Dos Leyendas, Templario and Los Hijos del Infierno ("The Sons of the Infierno"; Ephesto and Mephisto) lost to Diamante Azul, Soberano Jr. and Titán. Templario unsuccessfully challenged Soberano Jr. for the Mexican National Welterweight Championship on March 30 and October 6, with the latter match ending in a draw after a double pin in the third fall.

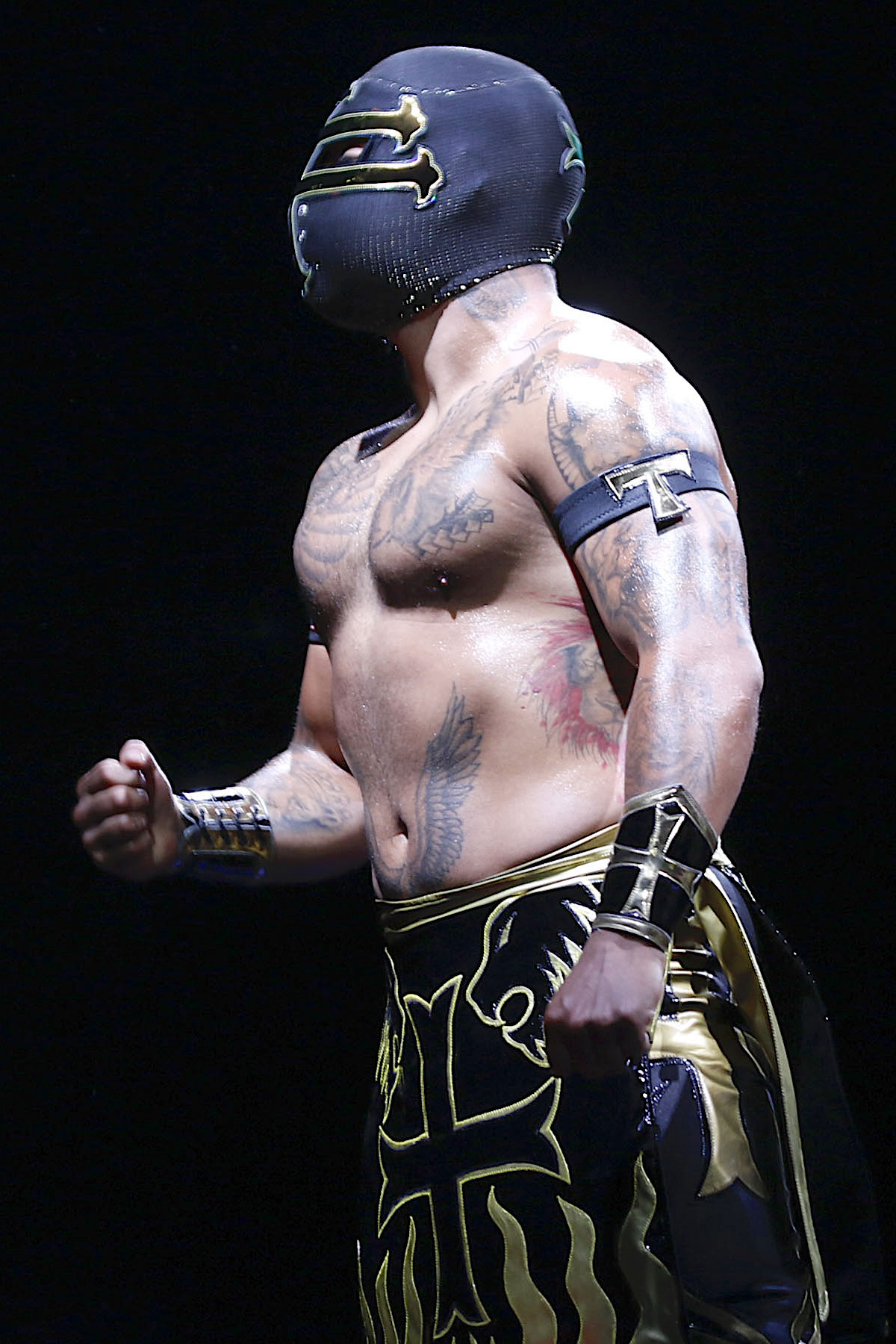
Templario in 2020

Templario won the Reyes del Aire tournament on January 14, 2020, lastly eliminating Star Jr. He and Soberano Jr. were paired for the Torneo Nacional de Parejas Increíbles ("National Incredible Pairs Tournament") as part of their ongoing storyline rivalry, but were eliminated in the first round by Bárbaro Cavernario and Volador Jr. on February 21. The following week, Templario and El Hijo de Villano III entered a 16-team tournament for the reintroduced Mexican National Tag Team Championship, eventually defeating Soberano Jr. and Titán in the semi-finals. On March 13, they lost to Atlantis Jr. and Flyer in the finals. On September 25, he unsuccessfully challenged Volador Jr. for the NWA World Historic Welterweight Championship at the CMLL 87th Anniversary Show. They won the Torneo Nacional de Parejas Increíbles on June 25, 2021, defeating Carístico and Virus in the finals. On July 30, he lost to Titán in the finals of the Leyenda de Plata tournament. At the CMLL 88th Anniversary Show on September 24, Templario defeated Dragón Rojo Jr. to win the vacant Mexican National Middleweight Championship. He then competed in a tournament for the vacant CMLL World Middleweight Championship, but lost to Soberano Jr. in the finals on December 10. During a six-man tag team match on January 22, 2022, while on opposing sides, Último Guerrero turned on Templario by ripping his mask, ending his time with Los Guerreros Laguneros.

==== Various storylines (2022–present) ====
In February, Templario and Soberano Jr. were paired for the Torneo Nacional de Parejas Increíbles, defeating Cavernario and Titán before losing to Averno and Místico. On July 22, Templario defeated Soberano Jr. to win the Leyenda de Plata tournament. After the match, Soberano Jr. challenged Templario to a mask vs. mask Lucha de Apuesta ("bet match") at the CMLL 89th Anniversary Show on September 16, which the latter accepted. However, it never occurred as Templario withdrew from the event due to a third-degree acromioclavicular dislocation in his left shoulder that would require surgery. Templario competed in the Reyes del Aire VIP on January 27, 2023, but was the last wrestler eliminated by Dragón Rojo Jr. The following month, Templario and Soberano Jr. lost to Averno and Místico in the finals of the Torneo Nacional de Parejas Increíbles. At Homenaje a Dos Leyendas on March 17, he, Dragón Rojo Jr. and Niebla Roja lost to Atlantis, Atlantis Jr. and Místico, after which Dragón Rojo Jr. tore Templario's mask. On May 12, Templario defeated Dragón Rojo Jr. to win the CMLL World Middleweight Championship after interference from Chamuel, subsequently vacating the Mexican National Middleweight Championship. Their feud culminated in a mask vs. mask Lucha de Apuesta on September 16 at the CMLL 90th Anniversary Show, where Templario defeated Dragón Rojo Jr. and forced him to unmask.

On July 23, 2024, Templario won a tournament by last eliminating Averno to earn an AEW American Championship match against MJF on August 2, which he lost. At Noche de Campeones ("Night of Champions") on September 27, he defeated Volador Jr. to retain the CMLL World Middleweight Championship. In late 2025, Templario and Titán competed in the Copa Independencia ("Independence Cup") tournament, which they won by defeating Galeón Fantasma ("Ghost Galleon"; Barboza and Difunto) in the finals at the CMLL 92nd Anniversary Show on September 19. At Noche de Campeones on September 26, he successfully defended the CMLL World Middleweight Championship against Villano III Jr.

=== New Japan Pro-Wrestling (2019, 2023–present) ===
In January 2019, Templario made his Japanese debut with New Japan Pro-Wrestling (NJPW) on the NJPW and CMLL co-promoted Fantastica Mania 2019 tour, primarily teaming with Bullet Club members Gedo and Taiji Ishimori as they faced off against Audaz and various tag team partners. He returned to Japan in February 2023 for the Fantastica Mania 2023 tour, and for the Fantastica Mania 2024 tour the following year, competing in several Relevos Increibles ("Incredible Relays") matches.

On December 9, 2024, TJP announced that Templario was the newest member of the United Empire stable. In his first match as part of United Empire, he and Jakob Austin Young defeated Los Ingobernables de Japón (Hiromu Takahashi and Titán) on December 15 at Strong Style Evolved. At Wrestling Hizen no Kuni on April 29, 2025, Templario unsuccessfully challenged El Desperado for the IWGP Junior Heavyweight Championship. On May 9, at Resurgence, Templario and TJP defeated World Class Wrecking Crew (Royce Isaacs and Jorel Nelson) to win the Strong Openweight Tag Team Championship. In October, Templario and Young were announced as participants in the 2025 Super Junior Tag League as part of Block A. They finished the tournament with four points after two wins and three losses, failing to advance to the semi-finals. On November 14, Templario and TJP lost the titles to Los Hermanos Chávez (Ángel de Oro and Niebla Roja).

=== Ring of Honor (2019, 2025) ===
As part of CMLL's working relationship with Ring of Honor (ROH), Templario appeared at the Summer Supercard pay-per-view on August 9, 2019, teaming with Hechicero and Bárbaro Cavernario in a loss to Carístico, Soberano Jr. and Stuka Jr. He returned to Ring of Honor at a ROH Wrestling taping on February 11, 2025, teaming with Atlantis Jr. and Máscara Dorada to defeat Magnus, Soberano Jr. and Volador Jr.

=== Major League Wrestling (2025–present) ===
Templario made his debut for Major League Wrestling (MLW) at SuperFight 6 on February 8, 2025, teaming with Esfinge to defeat Máscara Dorada and Místico. At Battle Riot VII on April 5, he defeated Esfinge and Hechicero in a three-way match. On September 13, at Fightland, Templario defeated Ikuro Kwon to win the vacant MLW World Middleweight Championship. He successfully defended the title against Virus at Symphony of Horrors on October 25 and against Kwon and Guerrero Maya Jr. in a three-way match on November 20 at MLW x Don Gato Tequila: Lucha de los Muertos, before losing it to Kushida on January 29, 2026, at Battle Riot VIII. Templario regained the title at a CMLL vs. MLW event on May 1.

=== All Elite Wrestling (2025) ===
Templario made his All Elite Wrestling (AEW) debut on the May 22, 2025 episode of Collision, teaming with Máscara Dorada and Místico to defeat Los Depredadores (Magnus, Rugido and Volador Jr.). At Fyter Fest on June 4, he and Atlantis Jr. lost to FTR (Cash Wheeler and Dax Harwood). On June 18, at Grand Slam Mexico, Templario competed in a 14-man tag team match, where his team was victorious.

== Championships and accomplishments ==
- Cara Lucha
  - Cara Lucha The Best Championship (1 time, inaugural)
  - Cara Lucha The Best Title Tournament (2016)
- Consejo Mundial de Lucha Libre
  - CMLL World Middleweight Championship (1 time, current)
  - Leyenda de Plata (2022)
  - Mexican National Middleweight Championship (1 time)
  - Torneo Gran Alternativa (December 2024) – with Legendario
  - Reyes del Aire (2020)
  - Torneo Nacional de Parejas Increibles (2021) – with Volador Jr.
  - Copa Independencia (2025) – with Titán
- Major League Wrestling
  - MLW World Middleweight Championship (2 times, current)
- New Japan Pro-Wrestling
  - Strong Openweight Tag Team Championship (1 time) – with TJP
- Pro Wrestling Illustrated
  - Ranked No. 68 of the top 500 singles wrestlers in the PWI 500 in 2026

== Luchas de Apuestas record ==
Winner (wager)	Loser (wager)	Location	Event	Date	Notes
Templario (mask)	Dragón Rojo Jr. (mask)	Mexico City	CMLL 90th Anniversary Show	September 16, 2023	
