= Zandokan Jr. =

Mexican professional wrestler

Personal information
- Born: November 22, 1999 (age 26) Guadalajara, Jalisco, Mexico

Professional wrestling career
- Ring name(s): Cain; Hijo Del Bucanero Jr. Zandokan Jr.
- Billed height: 1.86 m (6 ft 1 in)
- Billed weight: 105 kg (231 lb)
- Debut: December 25, 2015

Zandokan Jr. (born November 22, 1999) is a Mexican professional wrestler signed to Consejo Mundial de Lucha Libre (CMLL), where he is the leader of the Galeón Fantasma ("Phantom Galleon") stable. He is the winner of the 2025 La Copa Junior VIP tournament, and is a former Occidente Middleweight Champion. He has also wrestled in Japan for New Japan Pro-Wrestling (NJPW), and in the United States for Ring of Honor (ROH) and Major League Wrestling (MLW).

He is a third-generation wrestler, being the grandson of professional wrestler and Arena Jalisco founder Alfredo "El Abuelo" Carrillo. He previously wrestled under the ring names Cain and Hijo Del Bucanero Jr.

== Personal life ==
Zandokan Jr. was born in Guadalajara. His birth name is not a matter of public record, as is often the case with masked wrestlers in Mexico, where their private lives are concealed from the fans. He is the grandson of Alfredo "El Abuelo" Carrillo, who was a professional wrestler and the founder of Arena Jalisco. His father and uncles are also professional wrestlers. Growing up, he worked as a ticket seller, sold beverages and swept the floors at Arena Jalisco.

== Professional wrestling career ==
=== Early career (2015–2021) ===
He began training for a professional wrestling career without the knowledge of his grandfather, who did not want him to become a wrestler. He made his in-ring debut on December 25, 2015, at Arena Jalisco. Early in his career, he wrestled under the ring name Cain, which was then changed to Hijo Del Bucanero Jr. He wrestled on his first major show for Lucha Libre AAA Worldwide (AAA) on August 25, 2019, teaming with Sniper and Sunny to defeat Nuevo Poder del Norte ("New Power of the North"; Carta Brava Jr., Mocho Cota Jr. and Tito Santana). On February 16, 2020, Hijo Del Bucanero Jr. won his first Lucha de Apuestas ("bet match"), defeating Destruccion, who was forced to unmask as a result of his loss.

=== Consejo Mundial de Lucha Libre (2021–present) ===
==== Early years (2021–2024) ====
Zandokan Jr. made his debut for Consejo Mundial de Lucha Libre (CMLL) on April 13, 2021, teaming with Demonio Maya and Rafaga in a loss to Estrella Oriental Jr., Explosivo and Mr. Samurai. On February 22, 2022, Zandokan Jr. defeated Principe Daniel to win the Occidente Middleweight Championship. At Sin Salida ("No Escape") on January 1, 2023, Zandokan Jr. was one of twelve wrestlers risking their mask in a steel cage match, held under Lucha de Apuestas rules. He was the sixth wrestler to escape the cage, watching as Valiente Jr. unmasked Apocalipsis. On May 26, he competed in a tournament to determine the next challengers for the Mexican National Middleweight Championship, defeating Rey Samuray in the first round, before losing to Guerrero Maya Jr. in the semi-finals.

In late July, Zandokan Jr. began teaming regularly with El Hijo del Villano III and Villano III Jr., forming El Triangulo ("The Triangle"). On September 8, he competed in the semi-final torneo cibernetico of the Copa Independencia ("Independence Cup") tournament, where he eliminated Akuma, before being eliminated by Dark Panther near the end. At Día de Muertos ("Day of the Dead") on October 31, he was the third wrestler eliminated by Averno in a torneo cibernetico to determine the number one contender for the Rey del Inframundo ("King of the Underworld") championship. On February 6, 2024, Zandokan Jr. took part in the Reyes del Aire ("Kings of the Air") tournament, but was the third wrestler eliminated by Máscara Dorada. At Homenaje a Dos Leyendas ("Homage to Two Legends") on March 29, he unsuccessfully challenged Esfinge for the Mexican National Light Heavyweight Championship.

==== Galeón Fantasma (2024–present) ====
By the end of 2024, Zandokan Jr. drifted away from the Villano brothers, forming his own stable, Galeón Fantasma ("Phantom Galleon"), with fellow Guadalajarans Barboza and Difunto. During the semi-final torneo cibernetico of that year's Copa Independencia on September 6, Zandokan Jr. scored the first elimination over El Hijo del Villano III, only to be eliminated by eventual winner Titán. On October 25, he unsuccessfully challenged Averno for the CMLL World Light Heavyweight Championship. At Homenaje a Dos Leyendas on March 21, 2025, Zandokan Jr. and Star Jr. defeated Esfinge and Valiente in a Relevos Suicidas ("Suicide Relays") match to advance to a mask vs. mask Lucha de Apuestas in the main event, where Zandokan Jr. defeated Star Jr., forcing him to unmask and reveal his real name.

On May 23, Zandokan Jr. and Dorada outlasted Ángel de Oro, Atlantis Jr., Místico, Niebla Roja, Star Jr. and Volador Jr. in a torneo cibernetico to face each other in the finals of the La Copa Junior VIP ("The Junior VIP Cup") tournament the following week, which Zandokan Jr. won. On August 15, he unsuccessfully challenged MJF for the CMLL World Light Heavyweight Championship. On September 12, he and Difunto unsuccessfully challenged Brodido (Bandido and Brody King) for the AEW World Tag Team Championship. At the CMLL 92nd Anniversary Show on September 19, he, Hechicero and Volador Jr. lost to Atlantis Jr., Dorada and Neón. Shortly after the event, Zandokan Jr. underwent knee surgery, having injured it during the tag team championship match, sidelining him for an unknown period of time. On May 13, 2026, it was revealed that he would return from injury during the semi-finals of the La Copa Junior VIP on May 22, which was won by Atlantis Jr. and Villano III Jr. When Atlantis Jr. was injured before the finals, Zandokan Jr. took his place, but lost to Villano III Jr. on May 29. The following month, he won the "heirs" category of the Copa Dinastías ("Dynasties Cup") tournament, defeating Averno in the finals.

=== New Japan Pro-Wrestling (2023–present) ===
On November 19, 2023, Zandokan Jr. made his debut for New Japan Pro-Wrestling (NJPW) as the mystery partner of Los Ingobernables de Japón (L.I.J.; BUSHI, Hiromu Takahashi, Shingo Takagi and Yota Tsuji), defeating Just 5 Guys (Douki, SANADA, Taichi, TAKA Michinoku and Yuya Uemura). He was subsequently announced as Tsuji's partner in NJPW's annual World Tag League. They finished the tournament with six points after three wins and three losses, failing to advance to the semi-finals. Zandokan Jr. returned to Japan in February 2025 to participate in the Fantastica Mania 2025 tour, a series of shows co-promoted by NJPW and CMLL.

=== Ring of Honor (2025) ===
Zandokan Jr. appeared for Ring of Honor (ROH) on the April 18, 2025 episode of Ring of Honor Wrestling, teaming with Bárbaro Cavernario and Euforia in a loss to Atlantis Jr., Esfinge and Fuego.

=== Major League Wrestling (2025) ===
Zandokan Jr. made his debut for Major League Wrestling (MLW) at Azteca Lucha on May 10, 2025, where he unsuccessfully challenged Último Guerrero for the MLW National Openweight Championship in a three-way match also involving Bárbaro Cavernario. At Fightland on September 13, he defeated Blue Panther Jr. in the first round of the Opera Cup. On September 30, due to his knee injury, Zandokan Jr. was replaced by Star Jr. in the tournament.

== Luchas de Apuestas record ==
Winner (wager)	Loser (wager)	Location	Event	Date	Notes
Hijo Del Bucanero Jr. (mask)	Destruccion (mask)	Guadalajara	Arena Jalisco 46. Aniversario	February 6, 2020	
Zandokan Jr. (mask)	Star Jr. (mask)	Mexico City	Homenaje a Dos Leyendas	March 21, 2025	

== Championships and accomplishments ==
- Consejo Mundial de Lucha Libre
  - Occidente Middleweight Championship (1 time)
  - La Copa Junior (2025 VIP)
  - Copa Dinastías - Herederos (2026)
- Pro Wrestling Illustrated
  - Ranked No. 282 of the top 500 singles wrestlers in the PWI 500 in 2025
