= Dijak =

American professional wrestler (born 1987)

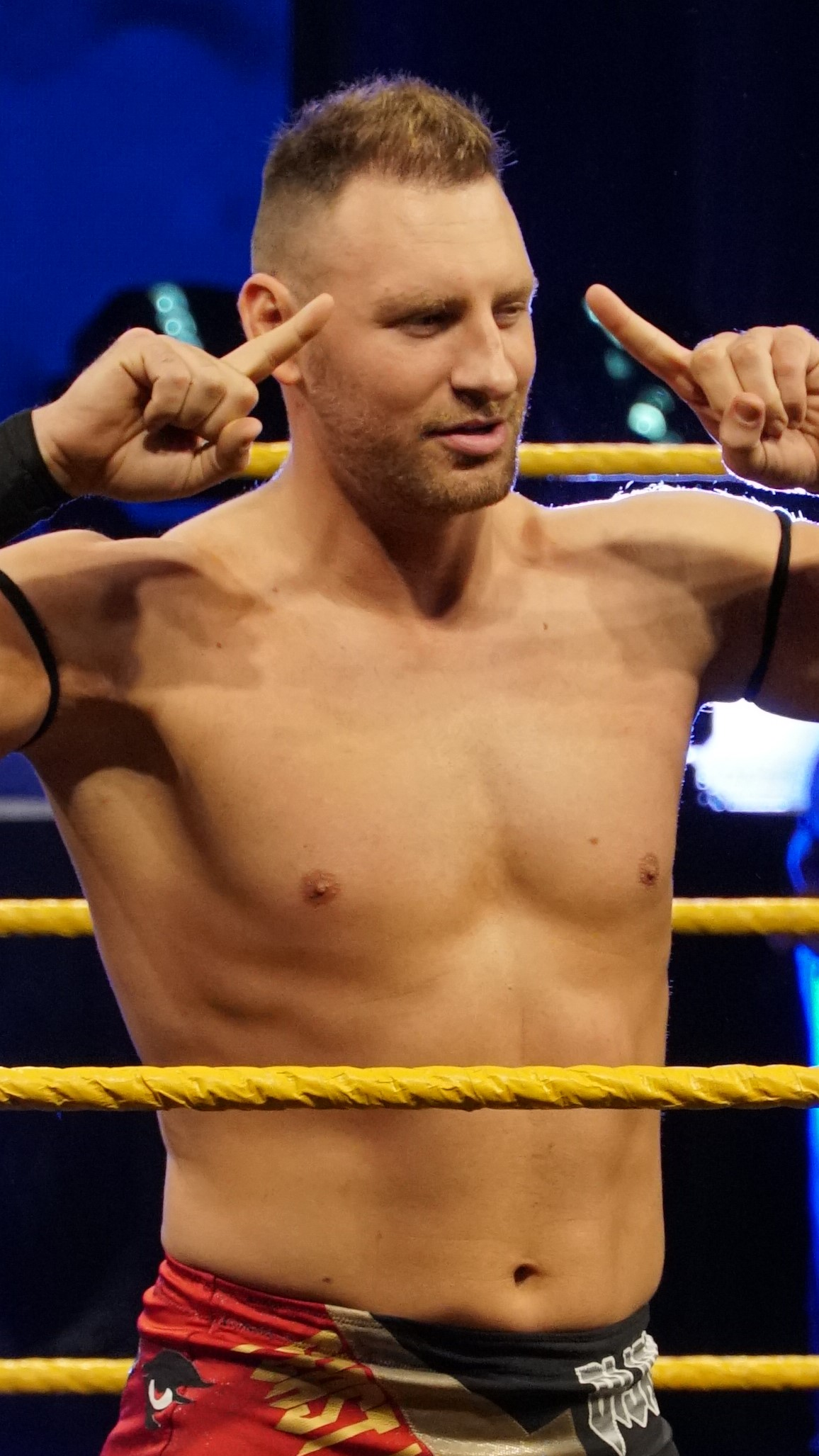
- Dijak in April 2018

Personal information
- Born: Christopher James Dijak; April 23, 1987 (age 39) Lunenburg, Massachusetts, U.S.
- Education: Bridgewater State University
- Spouse: Ashley Dijak (m. 2016)
- Children: 2

Professional wrestling career
- Ring name(s): Chris Dijak; Dijak; Dominik Dijakovic; Donovan Dijak; T-Bar
- Billed height: 6 ft 7 in (201 cm)
- Billed weight: 270 lb (122 kg)
- Billed from: Worcester, Massachusetts
- Trained by: Brian Fury; Todd Hanson
- Debut: 2013

Christopher James Dijak (/ˈdaɪdʒæk/ DY-jak; born April 23, 1987), better known by his ring name Donovan Dijak (or mononymously as Dijak), is an American professional wrestler. He performs on the independent circuit, notably for Progress Wrestling, where he is the current Progress Proteus Champion in his first reign.

Dijak began his professional wrestling career in 2013 under the ring name Donovan Dijak, working in several promotions on the independent circuit, most notably for Chaotic Wrestling, where he trained. In 2014, he signed a contract with Ring of Honor (ROH), where he won the 2015 Top Prospect Tournament. After leaving ROH in 2017, he signed a contract with WWE. He was assigned to their NXT brand under the ring name of Dominik Dijakovic. In September 2020, he made his main roster debut as part of the Retribution faction under the ring name T-Bar. Although Retribution disbanded in March 2021, he continued teaming with fellow member Mace until he was drafted to the SmackDown brand in the 2021 WWE Draft. In November 2022, he returned to the NXT brand as Dijak. During the 2024 WWE Draft, he was drafted to the Raw brand before leaving the company in June 2024.

== Early life ==
Christopher James Dijak was born and raised in Lunenburg, Massachusetts. He is of Croatian, Hungarian, and Italian ancestry. Dijak was a standout three-sport athlete at Lunenburg High School, excelling specifically at football, resulting in him being recruited by many top New England area college football programs. He was named the 2005 Sentinel & Enterprise Male Scholar Athlete of the Year, a Central Massachusetts Shriners All-Star selection, and was named a captain and selected as the team MVP during his senior season. Ultimately, Dijak accepted a scholarship to play college football for the UMass Minutemen.

After redshirting his freshman season at UMass and struggling to adjust at the large campus, Dijak ultimately decided to transfer to Bridgewater State University, a mid-sized liberal arts college located approximately 20 miles outside Boston, Massachusetts. At Bridgewater State, Dijak excelled at both football and basketball, leading the football team in both tackles and sacks in his junior and senior years, and led the basketball team in rebounding his senior year. Dijak also earned all-league honors in both sports. He was also named to the NCAA Division III Football East Region All-American team in his senior season playing for the Bears. Dijak graduated from Bridgewater State in 2010 with a bachelor's degree in Criminal Justice.

== Professional wrestling career ==
=== Chaotic Wrestling (2013–2017) ===
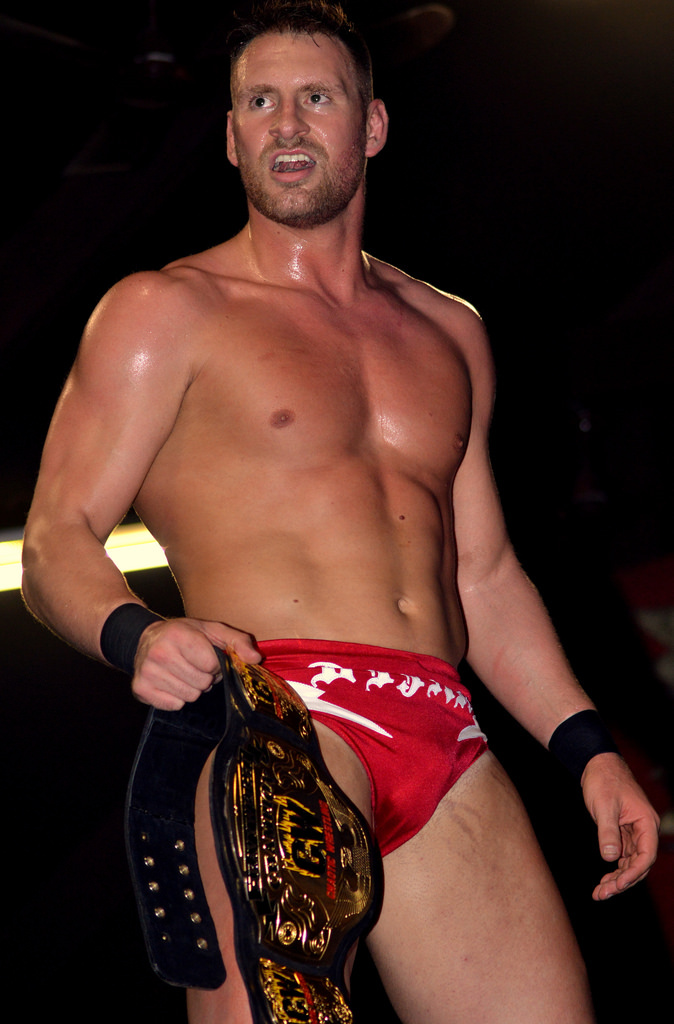
Dijak at a Chaotic Wrestling event in December 2014.

Following two losses in smaller promotions, Dijak joined Chaotic Wrestling, training under Brian Fury and Todd Hanson. He made his debut in August 2013 in a winning effort against Vern Vicallo, and remained undefeated until July 2014 when he lost to Chaotic Wrestling champion Mark Shurman. After earning another title shot in a fatal four-way match the next month, he went on to defeat Shurman in their rematch on October 24 and claim the CW Heavyweight Championship. After a reign of 148 days, he lost the title against Chase Del Monte on March 21, 2015. In 2016, Dijak teamed with Mikey Webb to form the tag team The American Destroyers. Dijak and Webb would go on to win the Chaotic Wrestling Tag Team Championship by defeating The Logan Brothers on December 26, 2016, before losing them less than a month later to The Mill City Hooligans. In his final match for the promotion, Dijak defeated Christian Casanova and Josh Briggs in a triple threat match for the Chaotic Wrestling New England Championship. Immediately after the match, he vacated the title.

=== Ring of Honor (2014–2017) ===
He made his debut in Ring of Honor on July 27 at Future of Honor 2, first defeating Stokely Hathaway and then falling in defeat to Moose. Dijak won the 2015 Top Prospect Tournament, defeating Will Ferrara in the finals. This victory allowed him to face Jay Lethal for the ROH World Television Championship. However, he refused to take this opportunity and instead joined Truth Martini's The House of Truth, establishing himself as a heel. His first match as a member of the House of Truth took place on March 7, teaming with J Diesel and beating the team of Brutal Burgers (Bob Evans and Cheeseburger). On June 19, at Best in the World 2015, he wrestled against Mark Briscoe on a losing effort. He managed to win his next pay-per-view match against Takaaki Watanabe at Death Before Dishonor XIII.

On December 19 (aired January 13, 2016), he was banned from Truth Martini's stable, initially turning face in the process. At the February 27 ROH TV tapings, Dijak came out with Prince Nana and attacked Truth Martini, turning heel again and making a rare double-turn with Jay Lethal and becoming Prince Nana's latest crown jewel in the Embassy stable. Dijak announced his departure from ROH via Twitter on February 12, 2017.

=== WWE (2017–2024) ===
==== NXT (2017–2020) ====
In January 2017, WWE pulled a contract offer from Dijak, following a legal threat from ROH, who still had him under contract. The following month, Dijak opted not to re-sign with ROH, essentially putting his career on hold, waiting for another contract offer from WWE. On July 20, it was reported that Dijak was finishing up his independent bookings ahead of joining WWE. Dijak reported to the WWE Performance Center on August 21. His signing was announced by the company on September 5.

Dijak made his debut for WWE's developmental branch, NXT, on September 23. His television debut, under his real name, came on May 30, 2018, in a loss against Ricochet. In July 2018, WWE revealed Dijak's new ring name as Dominik Dijakovic. Promos started to appear on the December 5, 2018 episode of NXT, promoting the debut of Dominik Dijakovic. Dijakovic made his debut as a villain on the December 19 episode of NXT, defeating Aaron Mackey. Following WrestleMania 35, he was set to feud with then NXT North American Champion Velveteen Dream over the championship. However, in April 2019, he suffered a torn meniscus that would require surgery. He would be out of action until late July, when he returned at an NXT live event.

On the November 13, 2019 episode of NXT, Dijakovic turned face when he joined Team Ciampa for the annual WarGames match with Tommaso Ciampa, Matt Riddle and Keith Lee against The Undisputed Era at TakeOver: WarGames. Riddle however proceeded to leave the team to pursue his rivalry with Finn Bálor, and would be replaced by Kevin Owens. At the event, Dijakovic and Team Ciampa defeated The Undisputed Era. On the January 29, 2020 episode of NXT, Dijakovic defeated Damian Priest to become the number one contender for Keith Lee's NXT North American Championship at TakeOver: Portland on February 16, where he failed to win the title. After the match, Lee and Dijakovic shook hands as a sign of respect. After Lee's NXT Championship win against Adam Cole at The Great American Bash, Dijakovic was challenged by Lee for both the NXT Championship and NXT North American Championship on the following episode, but was unsuccessful in capturing the titles. He was then attacked by Karrion Kross during a backstage interview, resulting in a match between the two on the July 22 episode of NXT, which Dijakovic lost. This marked his final appearance on NXT.

==== Retribution (2020–2022) ====
On the September 21 episode of Raw, he was revealed as a member of the villainous stable Retribution, under the ring name T-Bar, with a new outfit and a mask. On the October 5 episode of Raw, Mustafa Ali was revealed as the stable's leader. Over the following weeks, the faction had little success. At Fastlane on March 21, 2021, T-Bar and Mace attacked Ali, disbanding the stable. On the April 12 episode of Raw, T-Bar and Mace attacked Drew McIntyre, showing signs of joining The Hurt Business. The following week on Raw , T-Bar was finally unmasked along with Mace in a tag team match against McIntyre and Braun Strowman, in which T-Bar and Mace won by disqualification. Later in an interview, they confirmed the start of their tag team run. After a few weeks of absence from television, T-Bar and Mace were put as lumberjacks in a Lumberjack match between John Morrison and Damian Priest on the May 17 episode of Raw.

As part of the 2021 Draft, Mace was drafted to the SmackDown brand while T-Bar remained on the Raw brand, thus disbanding the team. On the October 25 episode of Raw, T-Bar got himself disqualified in a match against WWE United States Champion Damian Priest after throwing an office chair at the champion. On the November 1 episode of Raw, he lost to Priest in a no disqualification match in which Priest retained the US title. Throughout 2022, he was relegated to competing on Main Event until October.

==== Repackaging as Dijak (2022–2024) ====
On the October 25 episode of NXT, a vignette was shown of T-Bar's Retribution mask being tossed into a fire, teasing his return to the NXT brand. On the November 22 episode of NXT, he returned to the brand, now repackaged as a Terminator-inspired character under the Dijak name, and attacked Wes Lee after Wes successfully defended the NXT North American Championship against Carmelo Hayes. At Vengeance Day, Dijak lost his NXT North American Championship match due to interference from Tony D'Angelo and fellow NXT superstar Channing "Stacks" Lorenzo, thus giving Wes Lee the opportunity to capitalise on the distraction and retain the championship. On March 7 at Roadblock, Dijak was defeated by D'Angelo in a Jailhouse Street Fight. In April, Dijak began a feud with Ilja Dragunov. At Spring Breakin', Dijak attacked Dragunov backstage. At Battleground on May 28, Dijak was defeated by Dragunov in a Last Man Standing match, ending the feud.

On the November 7 episode of NXT, Dijak defeated Tyler Bate to qualify for the Iron Survivor Challenge at Deadline, which was won by Trick Williams. On the January 15 episode of NXT, Dijak faced Trey Bearhill, with Joe Gacy serving as commentator. During the match, Gacy headbutted Dijak. After Dijak won the match against Bearhill, Gacy attacked Dijak from behind and both men started brawling. The following week, a match between Dijak and Gacy was scheduled, but the match didn't happen due to Gacy attacking Dijak before the bell rang. Both men continued fighting until they were pulled apart by referees and security guards. On February 4, 2024 at Vengeance Day, Dijak defeated Joe Gacy in a No Disqualification match. During Dijak's matches after Vengeance Day, Gacy started appearing under the ring apron. On the February 13 episode of NXT, Gacy faced Carmelo Hayes in a losing effort. After the match, Dijak attacked Gacy with a nightstick and then locked him in a straitjacket and left. The following week, Dijak locked Gacy in an asylum cell, with Gacy laughing and telling Dijak that "this wasn't over". On the February 27 episode of NXT, Dijak defeated Luca Crusifino. After the match, Gacy ripped apart the straitjacket and started beating down Dijak until both men went backstage, where they continued fighting. On March 5 at Roadblock, Dijak defeated Gacy in an Asylum match. At Stand & Deliver on April 6, Dijak failed to win the NXT North American Championship from Oba Femi in a triple threat match which also included Josh Briggs.

At Night 2 of the 2024 WWE Draft, Dijak was drafted to the Raw brand in the supplemental draft, marking his return to the main roster after two years. On the June 19 episode of Speed, Dijak lost to The New Day's Xavier Woods in the Speed Championship #1 Contender's tournament. This would be Dijak's final WWE appearance as on June 27, Dijak announced that he would be leaving WWE after revealing that the company had decided not to renew his contract.

=== Independent circuit (2024–present) ===
On June 29, 2024, Dijak (now reverting back to his "Donovan Dijak" name) made his first post-WWE appearance at Blitzkrieg Pro.

=== Major League Wrestling (2024–2026) ===
At MLW Summer of the Beasts, a Doomsday clock appeared throughout the night and during a match between Nolo Kitano, LSG, Jimmy Lloyd and Little Guido, the timer on the Doomsday clock expired and Dijak appeared, making his Major League Wrestling (MLW) debut. He attacked Kitano, LSG, Lloyd and Little Guido and said that he was here to stay in MLW.

On June 26, 2025 at Summer of the Beasts, Dijak and Bishop Dyer, going by the name of "The Skyscrapers", defeated Los Depredadores (Magnus and Rugido) to win the MLW World Tag Team Championships for the first time, holding the titles for 317 days before losing them to The Good Brothers (Doc Gallows and Karl Anderson). After losing the tag titles, Dijak replaced Dyer wtih Josh Bishop as Dyer would leave MLW. The Skyscrapers disbanded after Bishop attacked Dijak on the November 5, 2026 episode of Fusion. On November 9, Dijak announced that he would be leaving MLW.

=== Consejo Mundial de Lucha Libre (2025–2026) ===
On May 2, 2025, Dijak made his debut Mexico at the MLW and Consejo Mundial de Lucha Libre (CMLL) co-promoted event CMLL vs MLW, teaming with Ikuro Kwon to defeat Galeon Fantasma (Barboza and Zandokan Jr.). The next day at Sabados De Coliseo, Dijak made his official CMLL debut, teaming with Matthew Justice and Paul London in a losing effort against Difunto, Gran Guerrero, and Hechicero.

=== Progress Wrestling (2026–present) ===
Dijak made his debut for Progress Wrestling at Chapter 199 on October 26, 2026, where he defeated Paul Walter Hauser for the Progress Proteus Championship.

== Other media ==
As T-Bar, he made his video game debut as a playable character in WWE 2K22, but was also featured in the game's MyRise mode as Dominik Dijakovic. This character was only available in the MyRise mode, however, and was originally not accessible by players. WWE2K added the Dominik Dijakovic character in patch 1.12 released on May 16, 2022, thus giving Dijak two characters in the game. He made an additional appearance as T-Bar in WWE 2K23 and as Dijak in WWE 2K24.

== Championships and accomplishments ==
- Blood Sweat Tears Wrestling
  - BST Championship (1 time)
- Bullpen Pro Wrestling
  - BPW Heavyweight Championship (1 time)
- Chaotic Wrestling
  - CW Heavyweight Championship (1 time)
  - CW New England Championship (1 time)
  - CW Tag Team Championship (1 time) – with Mikey Webb
  - Eleventh Triple Crown Champion
- Destiny World Wrestling
  - DWW Championship (1 time)
- Lancaster Championship Wrestling
  - Keystone Cup (2015) – with J. Diesel
- Limitless Wrestling
  - Limitless Wrestling World Championship (1 time)
- Major League Wrestling
  - MLW World Tag Team Championship (1 time) – with Bishop Dyer/Josh Bishop
- Progress Wrestling
  - Progress Proteus Championship (1 time, current)
- Pro Wrestling Illustrated
  - Ranked No. 104 of the top 500 singles wrestlers in the PWI 500 in 2020
- Pro Wrestling Resurgence
  - PWR Heavyweight Championship (1 time)
- Ring of Honor
  - Top Prospect Tournament (2015)
- Rebel Spirit Pro Wrestling
  - Rebel Spirit Pro Heavyweight Championship (1 time)
- Ryse Wrestling
  - Ryse Grand Championship (1 time)
  - Ryse Rumble (2024)
- WrestleCrap
  - Gooker Award (2020) – as part of Retribution
- WrestleMerica
  - WrestleMerica Heavyweight Championship (1 time)
- World Series Wrestling
  - WSW Australian Championship (1 time)
- WWE
  - NXT Year-End Award (1 time)
    - Match of the Year (2024) vs. Oba Femi and Josh Briggs at NXT Stand & Deliver
