= Rugido =

Mexican professional wrestler

Personal information
- Born: February 26, 1991 (age 35) Mexico City, Mexico
- Family: Jimmy Jackson (father)

Professional wrestling career
- Ring names: Dizzy; La Parka Negra (III); Rugido
- Billed height: 1.73 m (5 ft 8 in)
- Billed weight: 90 kg (200 lb)
- Trained by: Impala; Jimmy Jackson; Shu el Guerrero; Viento Negro; Volador Jr.
- Debut: September 24, 2017

Rugido (Spanish for roar; born February 26, 1991) is a Mexican professional wrestler. He works for Consejo Mundial de Lucha Libre (CMLL), where he is the one-half of current Mexican National Tag Team Champions alongside Magnus. He previously worked as Dizzy and La Parka Negra. His real name is not a matter of public record as is often the case with masked wrestlers in Mexico.

== Career ==
On the September 15, 2021 episode of Informa, Rugido was introduced as part of the stable Los Depredadores. In May 2023, he entered the Mexican National Middleweight Championship Tournament, where he lost to Guerrero Maya Jr. in a tournament final. On July 9, Rugido and Magnus won the Mexican National Tag Team Championship.

== Championships and accomplishments ==
- Consejo Mundial de Lucha Libre
  - Mexican National Tag Team Championship (1 time, current) – with Magnus
- Major League Wrestling
  - MLW World Tag Team Championship (1 time) – with Magnus
- Welcome To Mi Barrio
  - Barrio Bravo Tag Team Championship (1 time) – with Manchas
