= MLW Open Draft =

General information
- Sport: Professional wrestling
- Date: May 20–July 10, 2021

Overview
- League: Major League Wrestling
- Teams: 5150; American Top Team; Azteca Underground; Contra Unit; The Dynasty; Injustice; MLW; Team Filthy

The MLW Open Draft was a draft used by the American professional wrestling promotion Major League Wrestling (MLW) to refresh its roster in preparation for the promotion's return to live touring following the COVID-19 pandemic. Wrestlers were selected by MLW's various stables (referred to by MLW as "fight teams") among eight rounds, beginning on May 20, 2021, and concluding on July 10, 2021. (Note: Although MLW claims the draft picks are conducted by the promotion's stables, the results are actually predetermined by MLW's bookers as the draft is a storyline.)

== Background ==
On April 21, 2021, it was announced that MLW would hold their first event with ticketed fans since the start of the COVID-19 pandemic on July 10. This event would mark the first time that live-ticketed fans would attend an MLW event since AAA vs MLW in March 2020.

As part of the preparations for the return to live touring, Alicia Atout, on the May 5, 2021 episode of Fusion, announced that an open draft would be taking place on MLW's website and official YouTube channel where various wrestlers from the MLW roster, as well as free agents from various promotions in Japan, Mexico, and the independent circuit, would be drafted by the promotion's stables in an effort to refresh the roster. Later on the episode, former Lucha Underground authority figure Dario Cueto was revealed to be "El Jefe", the mysterious figure who sacrificed Salina de la Renta for not paying him for providing financial assistance to Renta's group Promociones Dorado. The new ring name of Cueto would later be revealed to be "Cesar Duran", with Duran representing his own stable called Azteca Underground. Azteca Underground, 5150, American Top Team, Contra Unit, The Dynasty, Injustice, Team Filthy, and MLW were the stables that wrestlers could possibly get drafted to. The draft began on May 20.

== Selections ==
The first round of the open draft began on May 20 with various wrestlers, including both members of the MLW roster and free agents, being drafted in the succeeding rounds. The final round concluded on July 10 at Battle Riot III.

=== Round 1 (May 20) ===
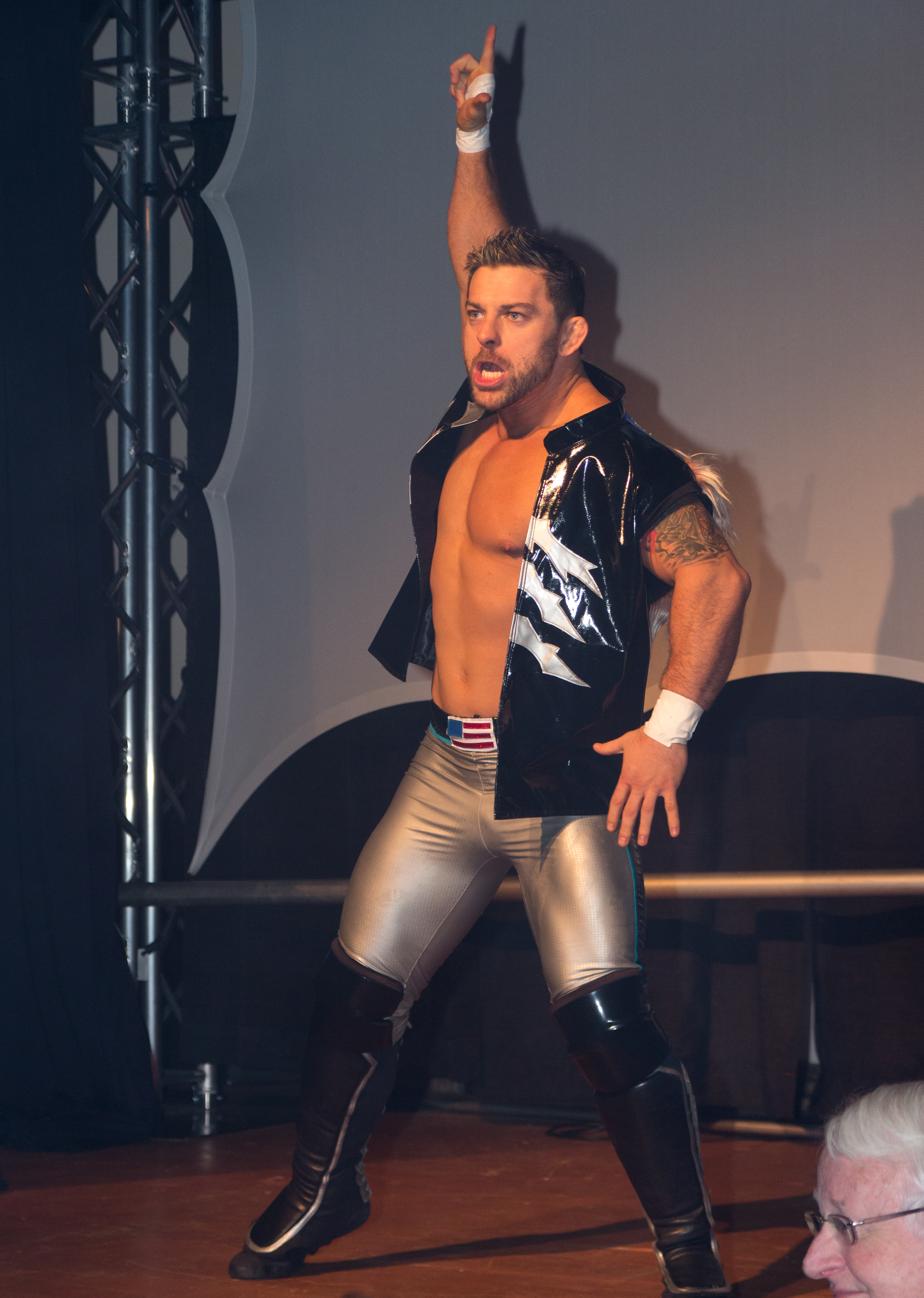
Davey Richards

Wrestler(s)	Fight team
Marshall and Ross Von Erich	MLW
Gino Medina	MLW
King Muertes	Azteca Underground
Davey Richards	MLW

=== Round 2 (May 27) ===
Wrestler(s)	Fight team
Gringo Loco	MLW
Tom Lawlor	Team Filthy
King Mo	American Top Team
Alex Kane	American Top Team

=== Round 3 (June 3) ===
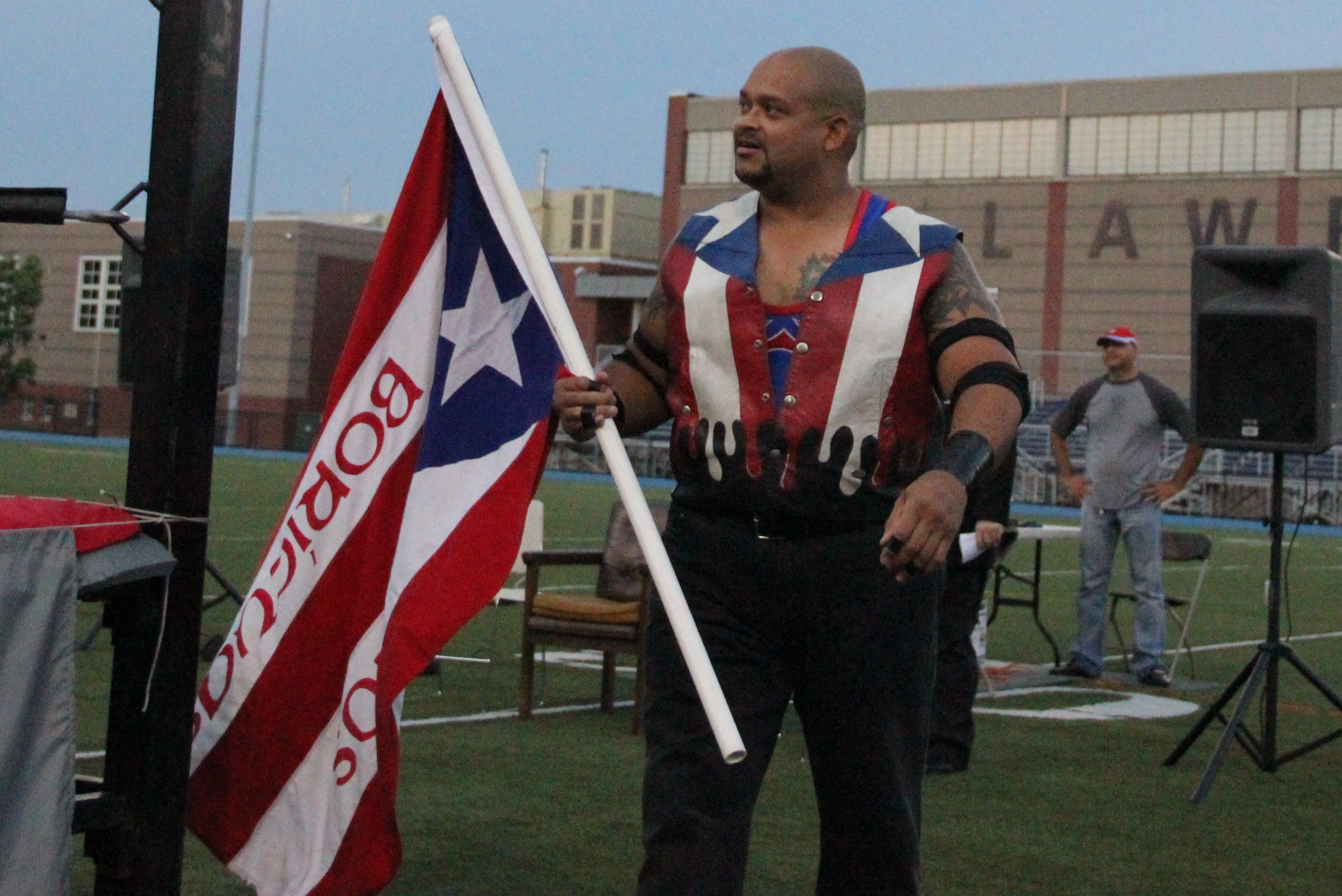
Savio Vega

Wrestler(s)	Fight team
Savio Vega	MLW
Zenshi	MLW
Lee Moriarty	MLW
Aramís	Azteca Underground

=== Round 4 (June 10) ===
Wrestler(s)	Fight team
Calvin Tankman	MLW
Mads Krügger	Contra Unit
Arez	Azteca Underground

=== Round 5 (June 17) ===
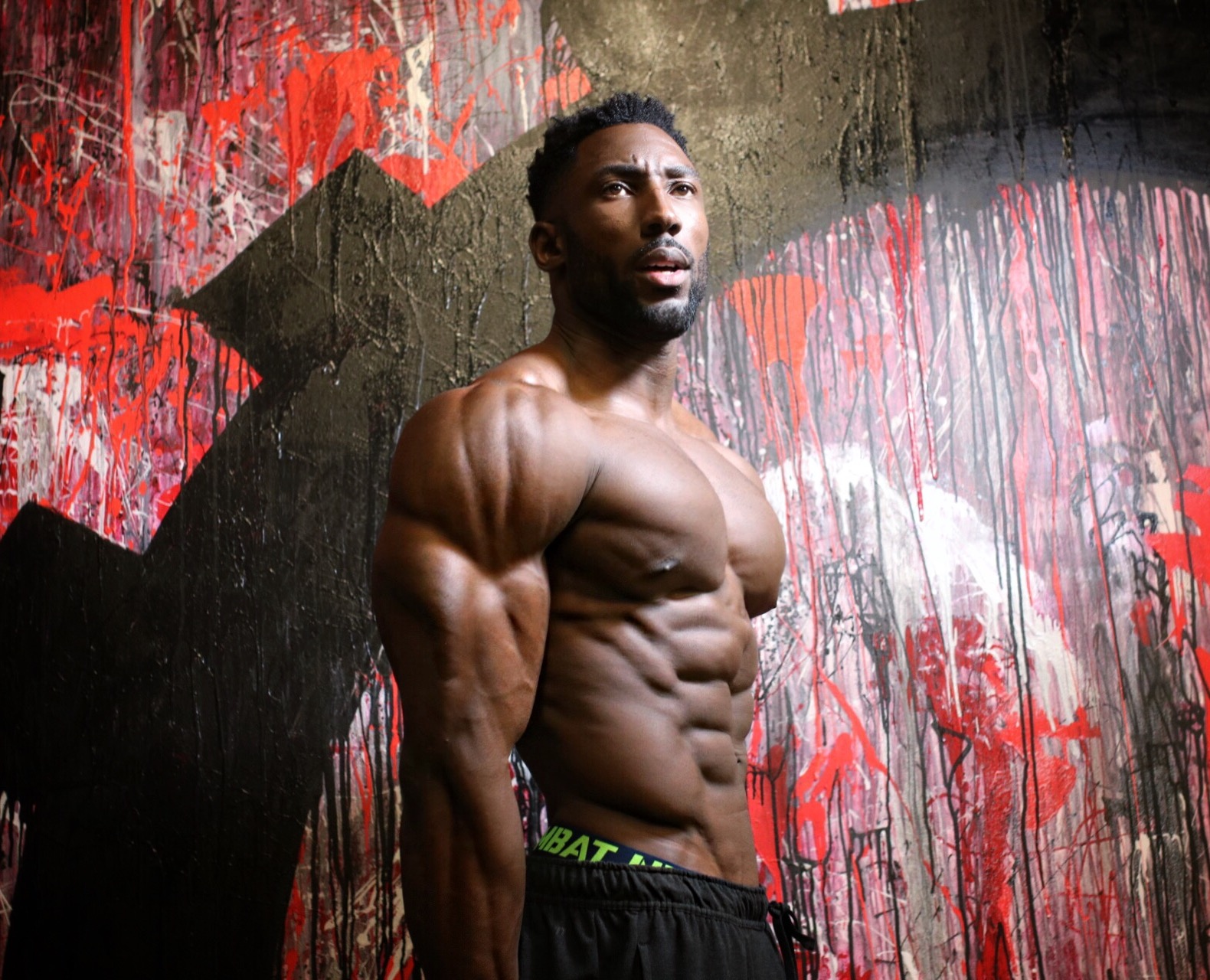
E. J. Nduka

Wrestler(s)	Fight team
TJP	MLW
Violence is Forever (Dominic Garrini and Kevin Ku)	Team Filthy

=== Round 6 (June 24) ===
Wrestler(s)	Fight team
Ikuro Kwon, Josef Samael, and Daivari	Contra Unit
Bu Ku Dao	MLW
E. J. Nduka	MLW

=== Round 7 (July 1) ===
Wrestler(s)	Fight team
Jordan Oliver	Injustice
Kit Osbourne	Team Filthy
Matt Cross	Azteca Underground

=== Round 8 (July 10) ===
Wrestler(s)	Fight team
Danny Rivera	5150
Slice Boogie	5150
Dr. Julius Smokes	5150
