= War Chamber (2021) =

Major League Wrestling event

- Promotion: Major League Wrestling
- Date: November 6, 2021 (aired November 17, 2021)
- City: Philadelphia, Pennsylvania
- Venue: 2300 Arena
- Attendance: 675
- Tagline: The Final Battle between MLW and Contra

Event chronology
← Previous; Fightland	Next → MLW Azteca/The Crash show

War Chamber chronology
← Previous; 2019	Next → 2023

War Chamber (2021) was a professional wrestling supercard event produced by Major League Wrestling (MLW), which took place on November 6, 2021, at the 2300 Arena in Philadelphia, Pennsylvania. It was the second event under the War Chamber chronology, and featured the finals of the 2021 Opera Cup.

The event was a television taping for MLW Fusion: Alpha on MLW's YouTube channel and beIN Sports USA, with the main event streaming as a special episode that aired on November 17, 2021.

== Production ==
=== Background ===
Other on-screen personnel
Role:	Name:
Commentators	Joe Dombrowski
Commentators	Rich Bocchini
Ring announcers	Tim Barr

On August 9, 2021, MLW announced that War Chamber would take place at the NYTEX Sports Centre in North Richland Hills, Texas on September 11. On August 20, however, the event was pushed back to March 4, 2022, due to soaring COVID-19 cases in the Dallas–Fort Worth metroplex. On August 25, it was announced that the final round of the Opera Cup would take place on November 6 at the 2300 Arena in Philadelphia, Pennsylvania. On October 16, MLW announced it had also rescheduled the 2021 War Chamber event to November 6, replacing Intimidation Games.

The first War Chamber event was held on September 7, 2019, as replacement for MLW WarGames, which was discontinued after WWE acquired the rights to the name of the namesake WarGames match for its NXT brand and their annual NXT WarGames events.

=== Storylines ===
The card consisted of twelve matches that result from scripted storylines, where wrestlers portrayed villains, heroes, or less distinguishable characters in scripted events that built tension and culminated in a wrestling match or series of matches, with results predetermined by MLW's writers. Storylines were played out on the mini-series, MLW Fusion: Alpha.

==== War Chamber ====
The main feud heading into War Chamber was between The Dynasty and Contra Unit. At Fightland, Alexander Hammerstone defeated Jacob Fatu to win the MLW World Heavyweight Championship. On the October 13, 2021 episode of Fusion: Alpha, Contra leader Josef Samael challenged Hammerstone to a War Chamber match against himself, Ikuro Kwon, Jacob Fatu, and Mads Krügger. After vacating the MLW National Openweight Championship, Hammerstone recruited EJ Nduka, and Dynasty stablemate Richard Holliday to his team. During the War Chamber "Control Center" segment on the October 27 episode, it was announced that Samael had recruited a Sentai Death Squad member, thus making the match 5 on 5. On November 4, MLW.com announced that Samael would be replaced with another Sentai Death Squad member.

With Hammerstone having relinquished the MLW National Openweight Championship, Azteca Underground owner and MLW matchmaker, Cesar Duran revealed in the opening segment of the October 27 episode of Fusion: Alpha that a new champion will be crowned at the "Fusion on Thanksgiving" special. On the November 3 episode, it was announced that Alex Kane, Alex Shelley, Myron Reed, Zenshi, and a Wild Card entry, would compete in a ladder match for the vacant title.

==== Opera Cup ====
On September 5, 2021, the previous year's Opera Cup winner Tom Lawlor pushed for entry into the 2021 tournament. On September 9, the tournament brackets were revealed with the first five participants being Lawlor, Calvin Tankman, Davey Richards, TJP and Matt Cross. On September 13, it was announced that Bobby Fish, who had been recently released by WWE, would be making his MLW debut at Fightland as the sixth participant in the Opera Cup. The following day, it was announced that Lee Moriarty would be the seventh participant in the Opera Cup. Alex Shelley was announced as the final entrant in the Opera Cup. During the Fightland tapings for Fusion: Alpha, Richards, Tankman, Fish, and TJP moved onto the semifinals. Richards would defeat Fish to advance to the finals, where he will face either TJP and Tankman. Both matches took place at War Chamber.

== Results ==
No.	Results	Stipulations	Times
1	Alex Kane defeated Alex Shelley, Myron Reed, Zenshi and A. C. H.	Ladder match for the vacant MLW National Openweight Championship	10:58
2	Gnarls Garvin defeated Budd Heavy	Singles match	0:50
3	nZo defeated Matt Cross	Singles match	10:57
4	TJP defeated Calvin Tankman	2021 Opera Cup Semi Finals	15:05
5	5150 (Danny Rivera and Slice Boogie) (with Dr. Julius Smokes and Konnan) defeated Los Parks (El Hijo de L.A. Park, and L.A. Park Jr.) (c)	Philadelphia Street Fight for the MLW World Tag Team Championship	9:38
6	KC Navarro defeated Warhorse	Singles match	5:31
7	The Sea Stars (Ashley Vox and Delmi Exo) defeated The Top Dogs (Davienne and Skylar)	Tag team match	4:49
8	Davey Richards defeated TJP	2021 Opera Cup Finals	18:48
9	L.A. Park (with El Hijo de L.A. Park and L.A. Park Jr.) defeated Homicide	Singles match	5:39
10	Holidead (with Dr. Dax) defeated Willow Nightingale (with The Blue Meanie)	Singles match	5:12
11	Arez (with Dr. Dax and Holidead) defeated Aramis	Singles match Winner gets a briefcase of an undisclosed amount of money from Cesar Duran	12:26
12	The Hammerheads (Alexander Hammerstone, EJ Nduka, Richard Holliday, Matanza Duran and Savio Vega) defeated Contra Unit (Ikuro Kwon, Jacob Fatu, Mads Krügger, Soldier #1 and Soldier #2)	War Chamber match	22:46
(c) / – the champion(s) heading into the match
