= Fightland (2021) =

2021 Major League Wrestling event

- Promotional poster featuring Alexander Hammerstone and Jacob Fatu
- Promotion: Major League Wrestling
- Date: October 2, 2021 (aired October 7, 2021)
- City: Philadelphia, Pennsylvania
- Venue: 2300 Arena
- Attendance: 1,000-1,200
- Tagline: The Most Anticipated Title Fight of the Year

Event chronology
← Previous; Battle Riot III	Next → War Chamber

Fightland chronology
← Previous; 2020	Next → 2022

Fightland (2021) was a professional wrestling television special produced by Major League Wrestling (MLW), which was held on October 2, 2021 and was the third event under the Fightland chronology. Matches from the event were taped for MLW programming; the main card aired as a one-hour special on October 7, 2021 on Vice TV, while other matches would air as part of the mini-series, MLW Fusion: Alpha, on MLW's YouTube channel and BeIN Sports USA.

Sixteen professional wrestling matches were contested at the event. The main event was a no disqualification title vs. title match, in which Battle Riot winner Alexander Hammerstone cashed in his Golden Ticket opportunity against Jacob Fatu, with both Hammerstone's National Openweight Championship and Fatu's World Heavyweight Championship on the line. Hammerstone won the match to end Fatu's two-year long title reign in what was also Fatu's first loss in MLW. On the undercard, Tajiri made his MLW debut against Myron Reed, Arez and Aramis for Reed's World Middleweight Championship in a four-way match, which Tajiri won.

== Production ==
=== Background ===
The show featured wrestling matches that resulted from scripted storylines, where wrestlers portrayed villains, heroes, or less distinguishable characters in the scripted events that built tension and culminated in a wrestling match or series of matches.

In April 2021, MLW announced a television deal with Vice TV. A block of MLW programming, including reruns of MLW Fusion, began airing on Saturdays starting May 1. On September 17, 2021, it was announced that Vice TV would air Fightland on October 7, following a new episode of its original documentary series, Dark Side of the Ring. As an expansion of the channel's professional wrestling programming, and their previous agreement with MLW, Fightland marks the first wrestling event to air on Vice.

=== Storylines ===
The card consisted of matches that resulted from scripted storylines, where wrestlers portrayed villains, heroes, or less distinguishable characters in scripted events that built tension and culminated in a wrestling match or series of matches, with results predetermined by MLW's writers. Storylines were played out on MLW's weekly television program, Fusion, and the league's social media platforms.

The main storyline heading into Fightland was the feud between MLW National Openweight Champion Alexander Hammerstone and MLW World Heavyweight Champion Jacob Fatu of Contra Unit. At the end of the AAA vs. MLW Super Series on the May 10, 2020 episode of Fusion, Contra Unit attacked various wrestlers and staff before ultimately taking over MLW headquarters (a storyline explanation for MLW's hiatus during the COVID-19 pandemic). Hammerstone was among members of the MLW roster seen taking back MLW headquarters in a video uploaded to MLW's YouTube channel on October 29, 2020. Hammerstone campaigned for a World title shot throughout 2020 and into 2021, as he was ranked #1 in MLW by Pro Wrestling Illustrated. At the end of the April 21, 2021 episode of Fusion, Hammerstone once again challenged Fatu to a title match. The following week, on the penultimate episode of the season, Contra leader Josef Samael denied the challenge on Fatu's behalf, claiming that he ultimately controls who gets to fight him. On June 10, 2021, it was announced that Battle Riot III will take place on July 10, and that Hammerstone would be the first entrant. Hammerstone would ultimately win the titular match, earning a World title match against Fatu. On September 1, 2021, Hammerstone revealed he will face Fatu at Fightland, and put his own National Openweight title on the line in a Title vs. title match.

On August 31, it was announced on MLW's website that Tajiri would be making his MLW debut at Fightland. On September 16, it was announced that Myron Reed would defend the World Middleweight Championship against Tajiri, Arez and Aramis in a four-way match at Fightland.

== Results ==
No.	Results	Stipulations	Times
1	Mads Krügger defeated Dr. Dax (with Holidead)	Singles match	0:38
2	Mads Krügger defeated Budd Heavy	Singles match	0:22
3	Alex Kane (with King Mo) defeated Warhorse	Prize fight challenge	5:42
4	Calvin Tankman defeated Matt Cross	2021 Opera Cup quarter-final match	8:15
5	Bobby Fish defeated Lee Moriarty	2021 Opera Cup quarter-final match	12:20
6	Davey Richards defeated Tom Lawlor via submission	2021 Opera Cup quarter-final match	11:41
7	TJP defeated Alex Shelley	2021 Opera Cup quarter-final match	14:47
8	Los Parks (L.A. Park, L.A. Park Jr., and El Hijo de L.A. Park) vs. 5150 (Homicide, Slice Boogie, and Danny Rivera) (with Dr. Julius Smokes and Konnan) ended in a no contest	Trios match	5:11
9	Nicole Savoy defeated Holidead	Singles match	8:06
10	Tajiri defeated Myron Reed (c), Arez and Aramis	Four-way match for the MLW World Middleweight Championship.	11:14
11	Calvin Tankman defeated Alex Kane	Singles match	—
12	King Muertes (c) (with Karlee Perez) defeated Tom Lawlor	Casket match for the IWA Caribbean Heavyweight Championship	11:51
13	EJ Nduka, Richard Holliday, Savio Vega, The Blue Meanie, Warhorse and Zenshi defeated Beastman, Gino Medina, Ikuro Kwon, KC Navarro, Kevin Ku and King Mo (with Kim Chee)	12-man elimination tag team match	13:15
14	Davey Richards defeated Bobby Fish	2021 Opera Cup semi-final match	12:09
15	The Sea Stars (Ashley Vox and Delmi Exo) defeated Willow Nightingale and Zoey Skye	Tag team match	4:45
16	Alexander Hammerstone (National) defeated Jacob Fatu (World) (with Josef Samael)	No Disqualification match for the MLW World Heavyweight Championship and MLW National Openweight Championship	16:21
(c) / – the champion(s) heading into the match
