= Battle Riot III =

2021 Major League Wrestling event

- Promotional poster
- Promotion: Major League Wrestling
- Date: July 10, 2021 (aired July 24, 2021)
- City: Philadelphia, Pennsylvania
- Venue: 2300 Arena
- Attendance: 1,000

Event chronology
← Previous; Never Say Never	Next → Fightland

Battle Riot chronology
← Previous; II	Next → IV

Battle Riot III was a professional wrestling event produced by Major League Wrestling (MLW) that took place on July 10, 2021, at the 2300 Arena in Philadelphia, Pennsylvania. It was MLW's first event since its hiatus due to the COVID-19 pandemic to feature live ticketed fans, the last being the MLW vs AAA Super Series in 2020. It was the third event under the Battle Riot chronology.

The event featured matches that would be taped for future MLW programming; the main card aired as a television special on July 24, 2021, on beIN Sports USA and MLW's YouTube channel. The undercard would air as part of the mini-series, MLW Fusion: Alpha, which premiered on September 22, 2021, on YouTube.

== Storylines ==
The show featured twelve professional wrestling matches that resulted from scripted storylines, where wrestlers portrayed villains, heroes, or less distinguishable characters in the scripted events that built tension and culminated in a wrestling match or series of matches.

Several names announced to participate in the Battle Riot were Alexander Hammerstone, King Muertes, Richard Holliday, Zenshi, Lee Moriarty, TJP, Gringo Loco, Arez, Kevin Ku, Mads Krügger, Myron Reed, Gino Medina, Calvin Tankman, Savio Vega, E. J. Nduka, Aramís, Marshall Von Erich, Ross Von Erich, King Mo, Bu Ku Dao, Alex Kane, Davey Richards, Daivari, Kit Osbourne, Josef Samael, Simon Gotch, Ikuro Kwon, Tom Lawlor, KC Navarro and Jordan Oliver.

== Event ==
Before the match, Azteca Underground owner Cesar Duran made his first appearance in an MLW ring and announced he was MLW's new matchmaker. He was then interrupted by Myron Reed and Jordan Oliver of Injustice, who demanded a match for the MLW World Tag Team Championship. They were in-turn interrupted by Konnan and a new incarnation of The Latin American Xchange (now composed of Slice Boogie, Rivera (formally known as Danny Limelight) and Dr. Julius Smokes), later to be known as 5150, and the two teams would get into a brawl.

== Results ==
No.	Results	Stipulations	Times
1^{D}	Rustin Grundy defeated Anthony Catena	Singles match	—
2	Delmi Exo (with Ashley Vox) defeated Brittany Blake	Singles match	6:40
3	Alex Kane (with King Mo) defeated Budd Heavy	Singles match	3:08
4	Gino Medina defeated KC Navarro	Singles match	4:16
5	The Von Erichs (Marshall Von Erich and Ross Von Erich) defeated Team Filthy (Kevin Ku and Kit Osbourne) (with Tom Lawlor)	Bunkhouse Brawl	11:24
6	Calvin Tankman defeated Lee Moriarty	Singles match	10:59
7	King Muertes defeated Richard Holliday (c)	Caribbean Rules match for the IWA Caribbean Heavyweight Championship	11:12
8	Alexander Hammerstone (c) defeated Tom Lawlor	Singles match for the MLW National Openweight Championship	12:43
9	Willow Nightingale defeated Ashley Vox (with Delmi Exo)	Singles match	7:16
10	Davey Richards defeated TJP	Singles match	15:01
11	5150 (Rivera and Slice Boogie) defeated Injustice (Jordan Oliver and Myron Reed)	Tag team match	6:59
12	Aramís defeated Arez	Singles match	11:50
13	Jacob Fatu (c) defeated Matt Cross	Singles match for the MLW World Heavyweight Championship	11:17
14	Alexander Hammerstone won by last eliminating Mads Krügger	41-man Battle Riot match for a future MLW World Heavyweight Championship opportunity	56:00
(c) / – the champion(s) heading into the match; D / – this was a dark match

=== Battle Riot match entrances and eliminations ===
Draw	Entrant	Order	Eliminated by	Method of elimination	Elimination(s)
1	Davey Richards	24	Lance Anoa'i	Over the top rope	2
2	Tom Lawlor (Note: Lawlor entered the match twice: once as himself and once disguised as L. A. Park.)	2	Davey Richards	Over the top rope	0
3	TJP	13	E. J. Nduka	Over the top rope	1
4	Lee Moriarty	15	Calvin Tankman	Over the top rope	0
5	Kit Osbourne	4	Marshall Von Erich	Pinfall	0
6	King Mo	9	E. J. Nduka	Over the top rope	0
7	Calvin Tankman	18	E. J. Nduka	Over the top rope	2
8	Arez	11	E. J. Nduka	Over the top rope	0
9	Gringo Loco	6	E. J. Nduka	Over the top rope	0
10	Zenshi	7	E. J. Nduka	Over the top rope	0
11	Aramis	3	Slice Boogie	Over the top rope	0
12	Alex Kane	8	E. J. Nduka	Over the top rope	0
13	Myron Reed	21	Danny Rivera and Slice Boogie (Note: 5150 (Danny Rivera and Slice Boogie) were already eliminated when they pulled Injustice (Myron Reed and Jordan Oliver) off the ring apron.)	Pulled down	1
14	Savio Vega (Note: Vega entered the match twice: once as himself and once under his old gimmick of Kwang the Ninja.)	1	Danny Rivera and Slice Boogie	Pinfall	0
15	Jordan Oliver	22	Danny Rivera and Slice Boogie	Pulled down	1
16	The Beastman	5	E. J. Nduka	Over the top rope	0
17	Danny Rivera	19	Jordan Oliver and Myron Reed	Over the top rope	1
18	Slice Boogie	20	Jordan Oliver and Myron Reed	Over the top rope	2
19	Matt Cross	14	E. J. Nduka	Over the top rope	1
20	Bu Ku Dao	12	TJP	Pinfall	0
21	Marshall Von Erich	37	Mads Krügger	Over the top rope	4
22	E. J. Nduka	17	Calvin Tankman	Over the top rope	10
23	Kimchee	10	E. J. Nduka	Over the top rope	0
24	Zicky Dice	25	Ikuro Kwon	Pinfall	0
25	Kevin Ku	16	Davey Richards	Submission	0
26	KC Navarro	28	Mads Krügger	Over the top rope	0
27	Lance Anoa'i	27	Mads Krügger	Over the top rope	1
28	L. A. Park	23	Marshall Von Erich	Over the top rope	0
29	Simon Gotch	38	Alexander Hammerstone	Over the top rope	0
30	Daivari	39	Alexander Hammerstone	Over the top rope	0
31	The Blue Meanie	26	King Muertes	Pinfall	0
32	Ikuro Kwon	35	Marshall Von Erich	Over the top rope	1
33	Ross Von Erich	36	Mads Krügger	Over the top rope	1
34	Josef Samael	34	Alexander Hammerstone	Over the top rope	0
35	Alexander Hammerstone	–	Winner	–	5
36	Sentai Death Squad (Note: Two of Contra Unit's Sentai Death Squad members entered the match.)	32/33	Alexander Hammerstone and Marshall Von Erich	Over the top rope	0
37	Kwang the Ninja	30	King Muertes	Pinfall	0
38	King Muertes	31	Marshall and Ross Von Erich	Over the top rope	3
39	Gino Medina	29	King Muertes	Over the top rope	0
40	Mads Krügger	40	Alexander Hammerstone	Over the top rope	4

== See also ==
- 2021 in professional wrestling
