= Slice Boogie =

American professional wrestler

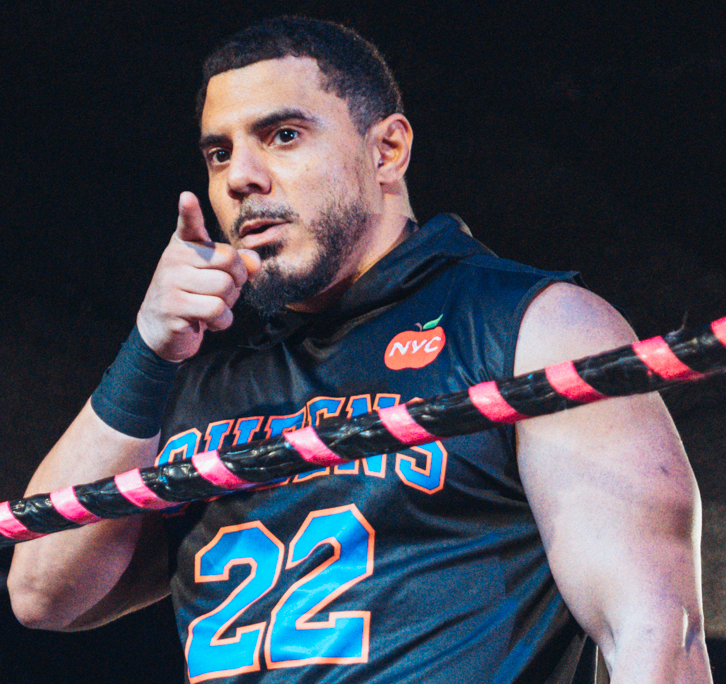
- Boogie in January 2024

Personal information
- Born: Milton Troche; November 22 Queens, New York City, United States

Professional wrestling career
- Ring name: Slice Boogie
- Billed height: 6 ft 0 in (183 cm)
- Billed weight: 236 lb (107 kg)
- Trained by: Santino Bros Wrestling Academy (Joey Kaos, Robby Phoenix, Phoenix Star and Zokre)
- Debut: 2018

Milton Troche, better known by his ring name Slice Boogie, is an American professional wrestler, currently working as a freelancer. He is best known for his tenures with Major League Wrestling (MLW) where he is a former MLW World Tag Team Champion.

== Professional wrestling career ==
=== American independent circuit (2018–present) ===
Among his main field promotion Santino Bros Wrestling, Boogie shared brief or longer tenures with various other promotions from the American independent scene such as National Wrestling Alliance, Major League Wrestling and International Wrestling Association (Puerto Rico). At Death Before Dishonor XVII, an event promoted by Ring of Honor on September 27, 2019, he teamed up with Chris Bey in a losing effort against Silas Young and Josh Woods. At GCW Just Being Honest, an event promoted by Game Changer Wrestling on January 24, 2020, he competed in a six-way scramble won by Gringo Loco and also involving Adrian QUest, Eli Everfly, Matt Vandagriff and Starboy Charlie.

==== Santino Bros Wrestling (2018–present) ====
Boogie made his professional wrestling debut at a house show promoted by Santino Bros Wrestling on November 23, 2018, where he defeated RJ Santos in singles competition. During his time with the promotion, he has won the SBW Championship, the top title on three separate occasions.

==== National Wrestling Alliance (2021) ====
Boogie shared a brief tenure with National Wrestling Alliance. He made his debut at NWA Back for the Attack on March 21, 2021, where he defeated Jax Dane, Jack Cartwheel and Crimson in a four-way match. He continued to make appearances as he wrestled at NWA Powerrr 26 on March 30, 2021, where he defeated Jeremiah Plunkett in singles competition. At the 29th episode of NWA Powerrr from May 25, 2021, he competed in a number one contender battle royal for the NWA World's Heavyweight Championship won by Trevor Murdoch and also involving Tyrus, Fred Rosser, Jax Dane, Marshe Rockett and others. At NWA Powerrr 30, Parrow fell short to Chris Adonis and Thom Latimer in a NWA National Championship qualifying match.

Boogie also competed in several of the promotion's flagship events. At NWA When Our Shadows Fall on June 6, 2021, he teamed up with Marshe Rockett and competed in a four-way tag team match won by La Rebelión (Mecha Wolf and Bestia 666) and also involving the teams of The End (Odinson and Parrow) and Sal Rinauro and Sam Rudo. At NWA 73rd Anniversary Show on August 29, 2021, Boogie competed in a Battle royal to determine the number one contender to the NWA National Championship won by Judais and also involving JTG, Rush Freeman, "Heartthrob" Jaden Roller, Captain YUMA, Jeremiah Plunkett, Marshe Rockett, Sal Rinauro, Jamie Stanley, El Rudo, Matthew Mims and Luke Hawx. Boogie teamed up with Marshe Rockett to take place in an NWA World Tag Team Championship Eliminator Tournament where they fell short to The Big Strong Pals (Matthew Mims and Sal Rinauro) in the first rounds.

==== Major League Wrestling (2021–2022) ====
Boogie made his debut in Major League Wrestling on July 10, 2021, where he alongside "5150" tag partner Danny Rivera and Julius Smokes were introduced by Konnan as members of The Latin American Xchange (LAX) at Battle Riot III. In the event, he competed twice. First in a tag team match where he teamed up with Rivera to defeat Injustice (Jordan Oliver and Myron Reed). Secondly, he wrestled in a 41-man Battle Riot match for a future MLW World Heavyweight Championship opportunity, bout won by Alexander Hammerstone and also involving many others notable opponents from the MLW roster such as Davey Richards, Tom Lawlor, TJP, Mads Krügger and Alex Kane. At Fightland on October 2, 2021, he teamed up with Homicide and Danny Rivera and wrestled Los Parks (L.A. Park, L.A. Park Jr., and El Hijo de L.A. Park) into a no contest. At War Chamber 2021 on November 6, Boogie and Rivera defeated Los Parks (El Hijo de L.A. Park, and L.A. Park Jr.) to win the MLW World Tag Team Championship. At MLW Azteca 2021 on December 3, Boogie and Rivera successfully defended the MLW tag team titles against Aero Star and Drago.

At Blood and Thunder (2022) on January 21, Boogie and Rivera successfully defended the titles against El Hijo de L.A. Park and L.A. Park Jr. in an official rematch. At SuperFight 2022 on February 26, Boogie and Rivera dropped the titles to Hustle and Power (E.J. Nduka and Calvin Tankman).

== Championships and accomplishments ==
- International Wrestling Association (Puerto Rico)
  - IWA World Tag Team Championship (1 time) – with Danny Rivera
- Major League Wrestling
  - MLW World Tag Team Championship (1 time) – with Danny Rivera
- Pro Wrestling Illustrated
  - Ranked No. 309 of the top 500 singles wrestlers in the PWI 500 in 2024
- Santino Bros. Wrestling
  - SBW Heavyweight Championship (3 times)
- Santino Bros. Wrestling
  - SBW Tag Team Championship (With Danny Limelight)
- United Wrestling Network
  - UWN Tag Team Championship (2 times) – with Papo Esco and Danny Rivera
  - Golden Opportunity Tournament (2023)
- Winner's Circle Pro-Wrestling
  - WCPW Pound 4 Pound Championship (1 time, inaugural)
  - WCPW World Championship (1 time)
- Relentless Pro Wrestling
  - So-Cal Heavyweight Championship (1 time)
- FIST COMBAT
  - FIST Heavyweight Championship (1 time)
- Rival Pro Wrestling
  - Rival Pro Wrestling Undisputed Champion (Current)

Classement PWI 500
Year	2021	2022	2023	2024
Rank	370	N/A	N/A	▲309
