= MLW Never Say Never (2021) =

2021 Major League Wrestling professional wrestling event

Never Say Never (2021)
- Promotion: Major League Wrestling
- Date: March 31, 2021
- City: Orlando, Florida
- Venue: GILT Nightclub

Event chronology
| ← Previous; Kings of Colosseum | Next → Battle Riot III |

Never Say Never chronology
| ← Previous; 2019 | Next → 2023 |

Never Say Never (2021) was a special episode of MLW Fusion which aired on March 31, 2021 on Fubo Sports Network and MLW's YouTube channel. It was the fourth event under the Never Say Never chronology.

Three professional wrestling matches were contested at the event. In the main event, Jacob Fatu retained the World Heavyweight Championship against Calvin Tankman, thus ending Tankman's undefeated streak in MLW. The undercard featured matches between Contra Unit and Injustice, in which Jordan Oliver defeated Simon Gotch and Myron Reed defeated Daivari.

== Production ==
=== Background ===
On December 9, 2019, it was announced on MLW's website that the 2020 edition of Never Say Never would take place at the Melrose Ballroom in New York, New York on July 16, 2020. However, MLW postponed all of its tapings due to the COVID-19 pandemic after the AAA vs MLW tapings in March. Never Say Never was postponed to February 4, 2021 at the Melrose Ballroom in New York City.

=== Storylines ===
The card consisted of matches that resulted from scripted storylines, where wrestlers portrayed villains, heroes, or less distinguishable characters in scripted events that built tension and culminated in a wrestling match or series of matches, with results predetermined by MLW's writers. Storylines were played out on MLW's television program Fusion.

The main storyline heading into Never Say Never was the feud between Injustice and Contra Unit. At the end of the AAA vs. MLW Super Series on the May 10, 2020 episode of Fusion, Contra Unit attacked various wrestlers and MLW staff before ultimately taking over MLW headquarters (a storyline explanation for MLW's hiatus during the COVID-19 pandemic). Injustice member Kotto Brazil was severely injured in the attack and doctors rendered him unable to compete (therefore explaining Brazil's legitimate departure from MLW when he opted not to sign a new contract).

In November 2020, a match was set up between Injustice member Jordan Oliver and Contra Unit member Simon Gotch at Kings of Colosseum, but Gotch faked injury and the match was cancelled. Later in the night, Contra attacked Injustice during an interview after Myron Reed lost the World Middleweight Championship to the debuting Lio Rush. Daivari made his MLW debut by joining Contra Unit in the attack and cementing his status as Contra's newest member. A rematch was set between Gotch and Oliver on the January 20 episode of Fusion which ended with Gotch winning the match. On March 18, a match was set up between Reed and Daivari at Never Say Never. On March 19, it was announced that Gotch and Oliver would have a rematch at Never Say Never.

On the March 4 episode of Fusion, the recently debuted Calvin Tankman defeated Laredo Kid and demanded a title shot against Contra Unit member Jacob Fatu for the World Heavyweight Championship on the basis of his undefeated streak since his MLW debut in November. Later in the night, Fatu successfully defended the title against Jordan Oliver and Contra Unit attacked Injustice and tried to lock them in body bags but Tankman made the save. On March 11, it was announced that Tankman would challenge Fatu for the title at Never Say Never.

== Event ==
=== Preliminary matches ===
The event kicked off with a match between Injustice member Jordan Oliver against Contra Unit member Simon Gotch. Oliver nailed a diving cutter from the middle rope for the win.

It was followed by a second match pitting Injustice against Contra Unit as Myron Reed from Injustice took on Contra Unit member Daivari. Reed avoided a frog splash by Daivari and removed the chest protector from Daivari's body and wore it and then nailed a springboard 360° splash on Daivari for the win.

A segment featured in which Alexander Hammerstone took issues with Mil Muertes on stealing Hammerstone's National Openweight Championship belt, setting up a match between the two on the April 14 episode of Fusion.

It was followed by an interview between former Dynasty members Richard Holliday and Gino Medina hosted by Alicia Atout, setting up an IWA Caribbean Heavyweight Championship match between Holliday and Medina for the April 14 episode of Fusion.

=== Main event match ===
The main event was contested for the World Heavyweight Championship between Jacob Fatu and the undefeated Calvin Tankman. Daivari distracted the referee by tossing the Contra Unit flag into the ring and Tankman headbutted Daivari. This led to the referee getting distracted in ejecting Daivari and Fatu hit Tankman with the flagpole and performed a double jump moonsault on Tankman to retain the title and end Tankman's undefeated streak in MLW.

== Results ==
| No. | Results | Stipulations | Times |
|---|---|---|---|
| 1 | Jordan Oliver defeated Simon Gotch | Singles match | 9:14 |
| 2 | Myron Reed defeated Daivari | Singles match | 8:05 |
| 3 | Jacob Fatu (c) (with Daivari) defeated Calvin Tankman | Singles match for the MLW World Heavyweight Championship | 10:44 |
(c) / – the champion(s) heading into the match
