= Jordan Oliver (professional wrestler) =

American professional wrestler (born 1999)

- Oliver in August 2026

Personal information
- Born: Jordan Oliver Jr. June 18, 1999 (age 27) Newburgh, New York, U.S.

Professional wrestling career
- Ring name: Jordan Oliver
- Billed height: 6 ft 5 in (1.96 m)
- Billed weight: 226 lb (103 kg)
- Billed from: "The 845"; Newburgh, New York
- Trained by: CZW Acadmey; D. J. Hyde; Jimmy Rave; Joe Gacy
- Debut: October 7, 2016

Jordan Oliver Jr. (born June 18, 1999) is an American professional wrestler. He is signed to All Elite Wrestling (AEW) and its sister promotion Ring of Honor (ROH), where he is one-half of Bustah and the Brain with Alec Price. He also performs on the independent circuit – predominantly for Game Changer Wrestling (GCW). He is best known for his work with Major League Wrestling (MLW) and Combat Zone Wrestling (CZW).

== Professional wrestling career ==
=== Early career (2016–2017) ===
Jordan had various wrestling matches as a backyard wrestler on the YouTube wrestling channel Sillysuperpop which is known as Grim's Toy Show Wrestling (GTS) from around 2016-2017. He had matches with opponents such as KC Navarro, Jay "The Key" Evans, Charlie Tiger, and more. He also began performing on the New Jersey independent scene.

=== Game Changer Wrestling (2017; 2019–present) ===
On December 30, 2017, at The Compound Fight Club: Chapter 1, Oliver made his debut for Game Changer Wrestling (GCW), in a five-way match, which was won by Matt Travis. He returned two years later at Crushed Up, and due to his style of wrestling, he has mainly appeared in scramble matches.

In March 2020, Oliver participated in the Acid Cup. He defeated fellow YDNB member Ellis Taylor in the first round, Nick Gage in the quarter-final, before falling to Blake Christian in the semi-final. In April 2021, he was again named a participant in the Acid Cup. He reached the final by defeating Edith Surreal in the first round, Brayden Lee in the second round and Cole Radrick in the semi-final. He won the tournament by defeating Lee Moriarty in the final. On May 1, at Ashes to Ashes, he unsuccessfully challenged Gage for the GCW World Title.

=== Combat Zone Wrestling (2018–2023) ===
Oliver was trained with Bronx Wrestling Federation and at the CZW Dojo, and spent 2017 working Dojo Wars shows. After his debut for Combat Zone Wrestling (CZW), he would continue to regularly make Dojo Wars appearances. On February 10, 2018, Oliver made his debut for CZW at Nineteen, in a 30-man rumble match, eventually won by Maxwell Jacob Friedman. Around this time, he formed Young Dumb N Broke, consisting of Charlie Tiger, Ellis Taylor, Griffin McCoy and McCoy's valet Valentina Vazquez. The stable often accompanied him to the ring and interfered in his matches. Represented by Oliver, Tiger and Taylor, the stable's first appearance was at New Heights, where they defeated the team of Brandon Kirk, D. J. Hyde and Kasey Catal and The Shook Crew (Bobby Orlando, Bryce Donovan and Max Caster). On September 8, at Down with the Sickness, Oliver earned his first title shot for the CZW Wired Championship, in a four-way match, which was won by Blackwater. On October 13, at the following event, Better than Our Best, Oliver defeated Blackwater for the CZW Wired Championship. One of his title defenses came against Andrew Everett, in which he performed a forward backflip off the top rope and caught Everett in midair. This match attracted the attention of Court Bauer, founder of Major League Wrestling (MLW), and would lead to Oliver signing for the promotion.

On April 13, 2019, Oliver participated in Best of the Best 18. In a first round four-way match, he defeated Matt Travis, Myron Reed and Sammy Guevara, only to lose in the semi-final against John Silver. On December 14, at Cage of Death XXI, he dropped the CZW Wired Championship to A. R. Fox, ending his reign at 427 days. Oliver was three days short of becoming the longest reigning champion, which was then held by Drew Gulak and has since been surpassed by KC Navarro. His final appearance for CZW came on March 21, 2020, at Saturday Night Special, where he unsuccessfully challenged Joe Gacy for the CZW World Championship, in a three-way match also involving Jimmy Lloyd.

=== Major League Wrestling (2019–2021) ===
Oliver made his debut for Major League Wrestling (MLW) on the April 24, 2019, episode of Fusion, defeating Kotto Brazil. He also competed in the Battle Riot II match on April 5, entering at number five before being eliminated by Ace Romero. On July 6, at Kings of Colosseum, Oliver allied himself with Myron Reed and helped him defeat Rey Horus. The two later formed Injustice with Brazil, feuding with the luchadores in MLW's middleweight division.

In 2020, Injustice began feuding with Brian Pillman Jr. After an attack on Pillman prevented a scheduled match with Oliver, MLW suspended the group. Injustice returned on the May 2 episode of Fusion, unsuccessfully challenging Los Jinetes del Aire for the AAA World Trios Championship.

Following Contra Unit's attack on MLW after the trios match, Oliver began feuding with the group, particularly its leader Jacob Fatu and member Simon Gotch. On August 6, 2020, Gotch attacked Oliver on Pulp Fusion. Oliver later retaliated on the December 9 episode of Fusion, setting up a grudge match with Gotch. After the match was postponed at Kings of Colosseum in January 2021, Oliver turned face and continued his feud with Contra Unit alongside Reed. On March 3, Oliver unsuccessfully challenged Fatu for the MLW World Heavyweight Championship. At Never Say Never on March 31, Oliver defeated Gotch, ending the feud.

On July 10, 2021, at Battle Riot III, Injustice confronted 5150 (Rivera and Slice Boogie), sparking a feud between the two factions over the MLW World Tag Team Championship. On October 6, Injustice lost to 5150 in a tag team match. The October 14 episode of Fusion: Alpha marked Oliver's final appearance for MLW. He was released from his contract on October 27, 2021.

=== All Elite Wrestling / Ring of Honor (2026–present) ===
On January 16, 2026 at Limitless Wrestling's Limitless Rumble event, MJF announced that Oliver and his tag team partner Alec Price had signed with All Elite Wrestling (AEW). Oliver and Price made their AEW debut on the January 21 episode of Dynamite, losing to FTR (Cash Wheeler and Dax Harwood). Oliver and Price later adopted the tag team name of "Bustah and the Brain" and began performing for AEW's sister promotion Ring of Honor (ROH).

== Championships and accomplishments ==
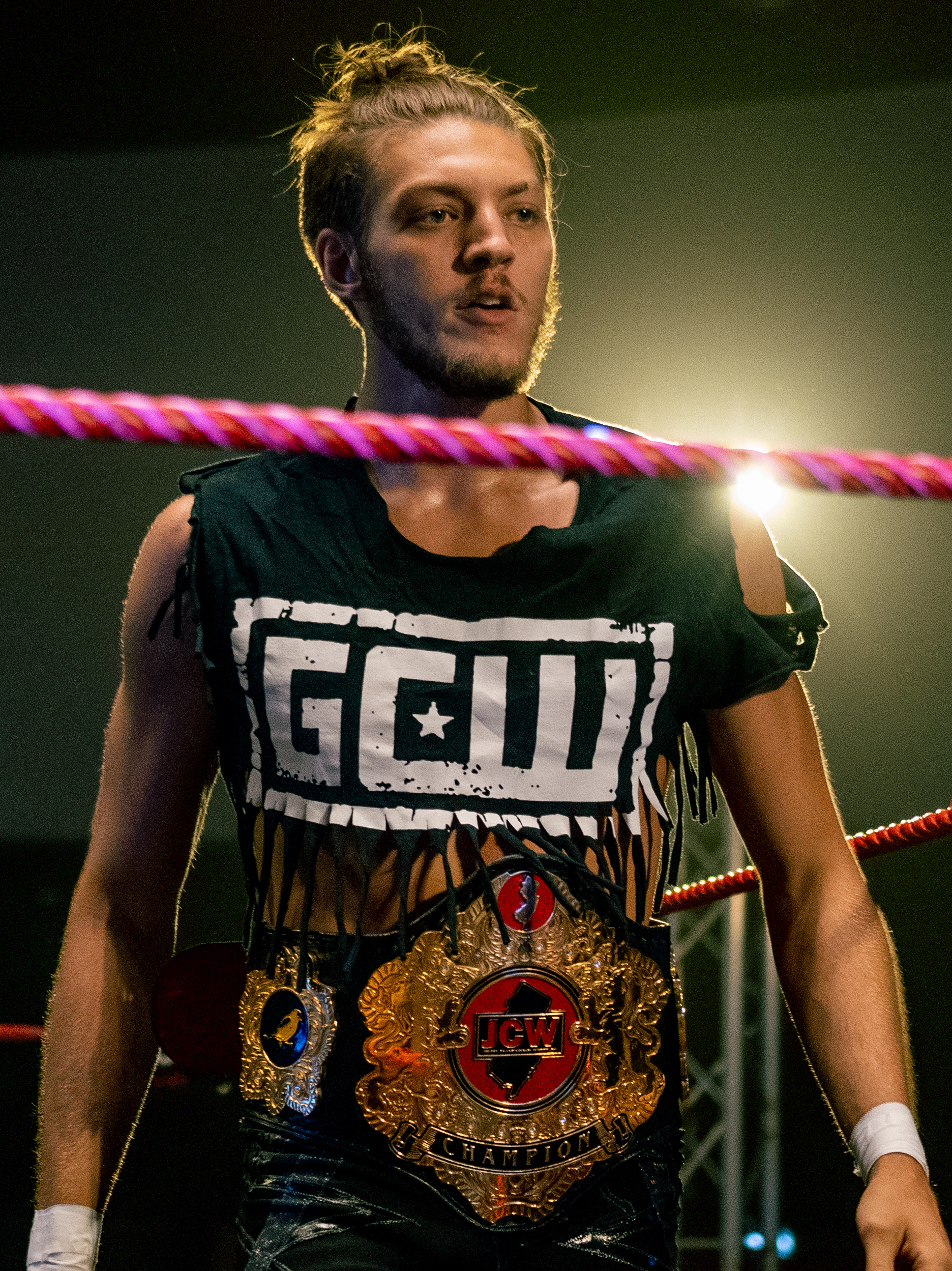
Oliver is a former one-time JCW World Champion.

- Banger Zone Wrestling
  - Miracle Cup (2025)
- Cross Body Pro Wrestling
  - CBPW Heavyweight Championship (1 time)
- Combat Zone Wrestling
  - CZW Wired Championship (1 time)
- Extreme Chaos Wrestling
  - Extreme Championship (1 time)
- Game Changer Wrestling
  - JCW World Championship (1 time, inaugural)
  - GCW Tag Team Championship (3 times) – with Nick Wayne (1) and Alec Price (2)
  - Jersey J-Cup (2023)
  - The Acid Cup 3 (2021)
- Grim's Toy Show Wrestling
  - GTS Loser Belt Championship (1 time)
  - GTS Intercontinental Championship (1 time)
  - GTS Hardcore Championship (3 times)
- Juggalo Championship Wrestling
  - JCW Tag Team Championship (1 time) – with Alec Price
- Pro Wrestling Illustrated
  - Ranked No. 114 of the top 500 singles wrestlers in the PWI 500 in 2023
- Super Powers Of Wrestling
  - SPO Trent Acid Skywalker Silver Championship (1 time)
- Superstars Of Wrestling Federation
  - SWF Cruiserweight Championship (1 time)
- Synergy Pro Wrestling
  - Synergy Championship (1 time)
- Vanguard Championship Wrestling
  - VCW Commonwealth Heritage Championship (1 time)
- Xcite Wrestling
  - Xcite Tag Team Championship (1 time) – with Alec Price
- UWA Elite Wrestling
  - UWA Elite Tag Team Championship (1 time) – with KC Navarro
  - UWA Elite Tag Team Combat Cup Winner (2017) – with KC Navarro
