= Latin American Xchange =

Professional wrestling stable

- The official LAX logo

Stable
- Leader: Konnan
- Members: Danny Rivera; Slice Boogie; Julius Smokes
- Name(s): 5150; The Latin American Xchange / LAX
- Billed from: Latin America
- Former members: See below
- Debut: December 31, 2005
- Years active: 2005–2009; 2011–2015; 2017–2019; 2021–present

The Latin American Xchange (LAX) is a professional wrestling stable that has wrestled in various incarnations primarily for Total Nonstop Action / Impact Wrestling and currently in Major League Wrestling (MLW).

The group achieved initial success as a stable consisting of Konnan, Hernandez and Homicide. Puerto Rican wrestler Apolo was a brief original member, who was later replaced by Machete. Later, upon the departure of Konnan from Total Nonstop Action Wrestling (TNA), Homicide and Hernandez wrestled exclusively as a tag team. The original gimmick of LAX centered on its members being Hispanic, denouncing the perceived repression of ethnic minorities by the NWA Championship Committee and TNA Management, with LAX's response as a group of militant street thugs. After becoming fan favorites, the group continued to stand as proud street Latin Americans, but dropped its militant focus.

In 2017, LAX returned to Impact Wrestling, with founding members Konnan and Homicide being joined by Diamante, Santana and Ortiz. They were briefly joined by Low Ki, and King who later assumed leadership when Konnan was absent. King later split the group along with Hernandez and Homicide to form The OGz. When Santana and Ortiz left for All Elite Wrestling (AEW), the stable became dormant. The latest rendition is called LAX 5150 or simply 5150 and is composed by Slice Boogie, Danny Rivera and Julius Smokes. It began working for MLW in July 2021, once again managed by Konnan.

== Professional wrestling career ==
=== Total Nonstop Action Wrestling ===
==== Konnan vs. The James Gang (2005–2006) ====
LAX emerged from the breakup of 4Live Kru, which was the result of 3Live Kru adding new member Kip James, and Konnan being tired of the shenanigans between B.G. James and Kip James. When Kip was permitted into the stable, it was the last straw. At Turning Point in 2005, Konnan attacked Kip and B.G. with a chair, signaling that stable's end. Throughout December, "Bullet" Bob Armstrong, B.G. James' father, tried to get 4Live Kru back together. On the December 31, 2005 episode of TNA Impact!, Bullet Bob encountered Konnan, who expressed himself like he had a change of heart and was willing to talk. Later in the show, however, two other Latino wrestlers, the returning Apolo and the debuting Homicide, ambushed Bullet Bob backstage at Konnan's command. As a result, a feud began between LAX and the James Gang, who sought revenge for the attack.

The feud between LAX and the James Gang continued through January 2006. At Against All Odds on February 12, 2006, Apolo and Homicide were scheduled to wrestle the James Gang. Apolo, however, had been released from TNA earlier that month for no-showing an event. His departure was explained on-screen by Konnan, who simply stated that the LAX was expanding, then introduced Apolo's replacement, the debuting Machete. Homicide and Machete went on to lose to the James Gang. On the March 18, 2006 episode of Impact, Homicide and Machete lost to Shark Boy and Norman Smiley after Konnan inadvertently hit Machete with his slapjack. After the match, Konnan tore off Machete's Puerto Rican t-shirt and threw him out of the stable. On the March 31 episode of TNA Xplosion, Konnan justified why he fired Machete, pointing to Machete's loss to Shark Boy. Later that evening, Konnan introduced the newest member of the LAX, the returning Hernandez. Hernandez and Homicide teamed together in a loss to Chris Sabin and Jay Lethal.

==== The Militant Thugs (2006–2007) ====
LAX were next involved in an angle where they refused to wrestle, claiming that Latinos were "discriminated" against in TNA. The storyline borrowed heavily from the then-current controversy surrounding illegal immigration. During this time Konnan established a "border" around the Spanish announcer area (where he provided Spanish commentary alongside Moody Jack Meléndez) and denied entry to non-Latino individuals (they usually used the derogatory term "gringo" when referring to American wrestlers or non-Latino wrestlers in general). LAX often jumped any wrestlers who wander too close to the area. On the June 29 episode of Impact!, Jim Cornette declared that LAX's work stoppage would mean a "check stoppage". Homicide would wrestle on the July 6 episode, with the stipulation that LAX have a special Spanish ring entrance, announced by Melendez.

Konnan later made an offer to Ron "The Truth" Killings to join LAX. After Killings denied the offer, LAX assaulted him. LAX also attempted to give Sonjay Dutt a similar beating after one of Dutt's matches, but Killings interfered and made the save; this led to a tag team match at Victory Road between Homicide and Hernandez and Killings and Dutt. Hernandez picked up the victory for LAX after applying the Border Toss on Dutt.

On the July 20 episode of Impact!, the NWA World Tag Team Champions A.J. Styles and Christopher Daniels made an open challenge in which they offered any team on the TNA roster a contract to face them for the titles, including LAX, who would then proceed to attack the champions, causing both of them to bleed, and then signed the contract with Daniels' blood. On the August 24 episode of Impact!, LAX would defeat Styles and Daniels in a Border Brawl to win the NWA World Tag Team Championship. LAX lost the title back to Styles and Daniels at No Surrender in the first ever tag team Ultimate X match, but were granted a rematch after assaulting Styles in Mexico City. LAX regained the title in a Six Sides of Steel match at Bound for Glory, after Homicide performed Da Gringo Killa on Styles, while Konnan strangled Daniels with a coathanger from outside the cage.

On the edition of October 19 of Impact! LAX started a feud with America's Most Wanted (James Storm and Chris Harris) by attacking them after the four of them had lost an eight-man tag team match against Styles, Daniels and the James Gang. The assault ended with Hernandez applying the Border Toss on AMW's manager Gail Kim. During the November 16 episode of Impact!, LAX nearly burned the American flag, as they promised one week earlier, but were stopped by Petey Williams. After stealing a victory over America's Most Wanted at Genesis Konnan told Homicide to use Da Gringo Killa on Gail Kim. Petey Williams made the save, and TNA Management Director Jim Cornette stripped them of the Titles for "conduct extremely disrespectful to TNA and its fans," which ironically caused fans in the arena to turn on Cornette despite LAX being the villains.

LAX refused to return the belts, hired a lawyer, and (kayfabe) threatened to sue TNA for violating their First Amendment rights. At that point, Cornette backed down and reinstated LAX as NWA World Tag Team Champions. On the next episode of Impact! they were placed in a match against Kurt Angle and Petey Williams with Cornette stating that he could not strip them of the titles but he could make them defend it. Throughout the broadcast LAX took out James Storm and Chris Harris, as well as Petey Williams right before the title match. LAX seemed to have the advantage on Angle when Samoa Joe came out to tag with Angle. Angle and Joe both proceeded to apply their respective submission holds and made both Homicide and Hernandez tap, thus apparently winning the NWA World Tag Team Championships. But soon after the bell sounded Cornette and LAX's lawyer appeared with the lawyer stating Joe was not signed to the contract and the match must be declared a disqualification on Angle to end the show. At Turning Point, LAX defeated America's Most Wanted in a flag match after they managed to hang the Mexican Flag, making the LAX the first non-American team to win a flag match on American soil. They had another victory over America's Most Wanted on December 14 in a "Titles vs. Career" match after James Storm deliberately hit Chris Harris with a beer bottle. The loss forced AMW to disband.

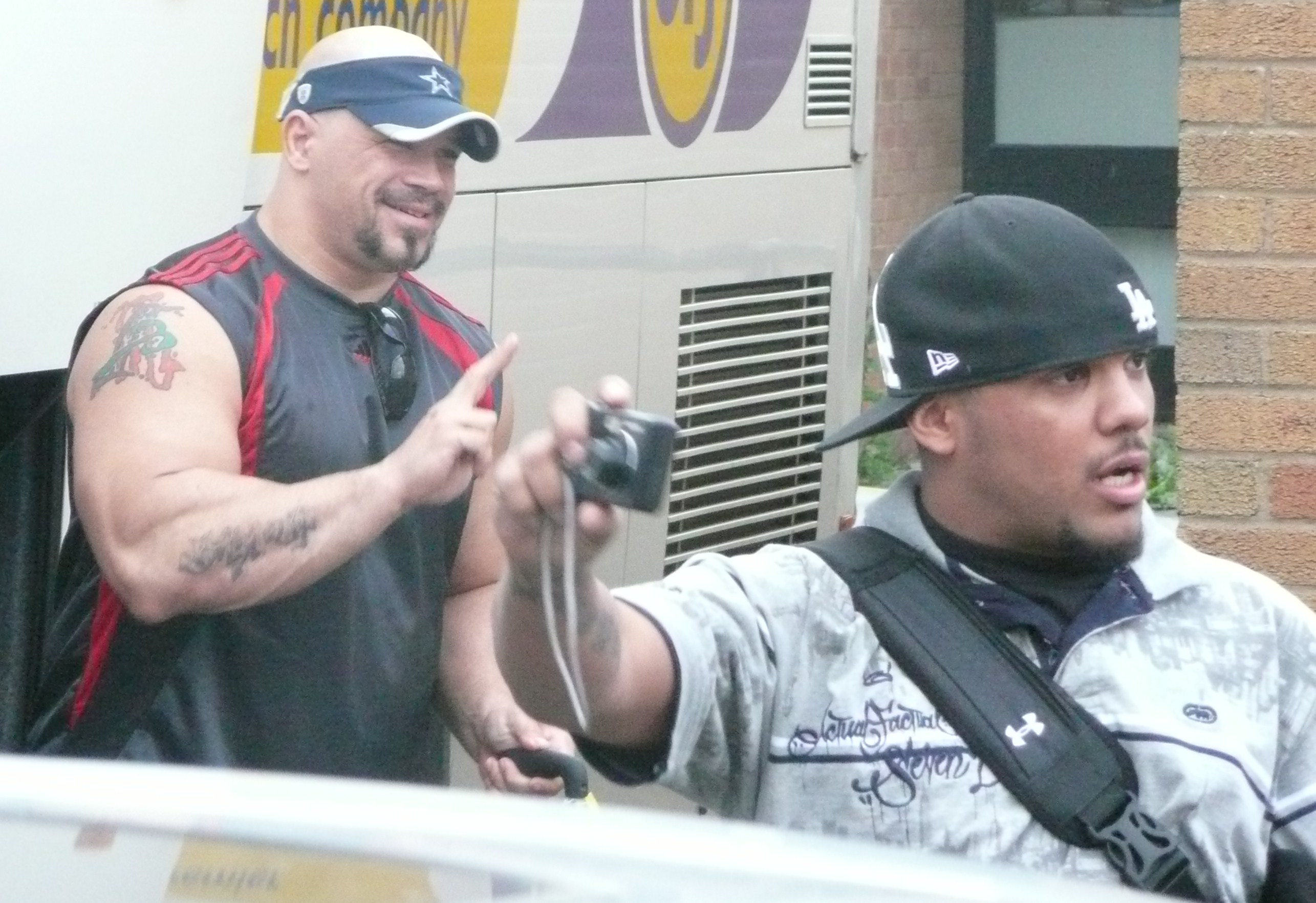
Hernandez (left) and Homicide (right) after a TNA event in 2008

On the edition of January 4, 2007 of Impact!, Homicide and Brother Runt competed in a "Lucha Callejera", or Street Fight. The match ended with Hernandez interfering when he applied a Border Toss on Runt, throwing him into a propped-up ladder. Then LAX entered into a feud against Team 3D. At Final Resolution, LAX retained their tag championship by disqualification against Team 3D, when an apparently drunk Brother Runt came out and jumped off the top rope with a headbutt on Homicide. Konnan was not with LAX; he was injured recovering from hip replacement surgery. The television storyline cover for the surgery's necessity was a Team 3D "sniper attack". He would later be scheduled to have kidney replacement surgery, as well. LAX and 3D met again on Impact! the same week, LAX retained the titles when Hernandez used the slapjack to score a pinfall over Brother Ray. In mid-February, Machete returned to TNA and to the LAX, although he was not recognized as part of the TNA roster, in an enforcer/bodyguard role, seen with a Puerto Rican flag bandanna over the lower part of his face, pushing the wheelchair-laden Konnan to the ringside area so he could continue managing Homicide and Hernandez during matches. The team revealed even more of a mean streak in the wake of Konnan's injury. The LAX formed an alliance with Alex Shelley, as they would attack the family and friends of Team 3D as Shelley videotaped the assaults, which included Brother Ray's real-life uncle, Brother Devon's trainer Johnny Rodz, and Brother Runt. In the February 23 episode of Impact!, the teams faced each other in a "Belting Pot" lumberjack match, in which both teams had a group of leather strap-armed followers that would act as lumberjacks in the match. LAX was supported by a group of "Latino Nation" members and Team 3D had a group of "Italian Family" mobsters behind them (this angle was used to promote Brother Ray's Italian roots). Team 3D won that match after the leader of the Italian mobsters (Sopranos star Steve Schirripa) interfered. The teams met again at Destination X in a Ghetto Brawl, and the match was won by LAX. Later that week, the teams faced each other again a six-man tag match, in what would end up being another victory for LAX and Shelley. The LAX would claim to rob the legacy of Team 3D, until Team 3D with their honorary WWE, WCW and ECW tag team championships in tow, would challenge LAX at Lockdown. LAX accepted, under the condition that the Six Sides of Steel would be electrified, a match that played into the LAX's favor with its Mexican wrestling heritage. Before the event, LAX kidnapped Brother Runt and shot him with a tazer gun to antagonize Team 3D. At Lockdown, LAX lost to Team 3D as they were defeated in the Electrified Steel Cage match to lose the NWA World Tag Team Championships. At Sacrifice, LAX failed to regain the World Tag Team Title in a Triple Threat Tag Team match against Team 3D and Scott Steiner and Tomko, although neither LAX member was involved in the decision.

==== Heroes of the Latino Nation (2007–2008) ====
Despite Konnan quitting at the June 19 TNA IMPACT! tapings, Homicide and Hernandez remained in TNA to continue on as LAX. On the edition of July 26, 2007 of Impact!, LAX became heroes by attacking the Voodoo Kin Mafia for disgracing the Puerto Rican flag. At Hard Justice, LAX beat VKM. VKM originally beat LAX when Kip James pinned Hernandez with the Fameasser, however Hector Guerrero, the one Latin American who LAX had actually feuded with (although loosely) during Konnan's tenure as the leader, showed the referee that VKM had used powder to win. After a restart Homicide pinned Kip with a roll-up.

At the following pay-per-view, Bound for Glory, LAX defeated Elix Skipper and Senshi in an Ultimate X Match to become number one contender to the TNA World Tag Team Championship. They were, however, unsuccessful in their attempt to become tag team champions to A.J. Styles and Tomko on an episode of Impact!. In the weeks following, the stable was aided by a heavily clothed, masked figure whom, at Final Resolution was revealed as Salinas. At the 2008 Destination X pay-per-view in March, LAX got back in the title picture by defeating The Motor City Machine Guns (Alex Shelley and Chris Sabin) and The Rock 'n Rave Infection (Jimmy Rave and Lance Hoyt) in a number one contender's match.

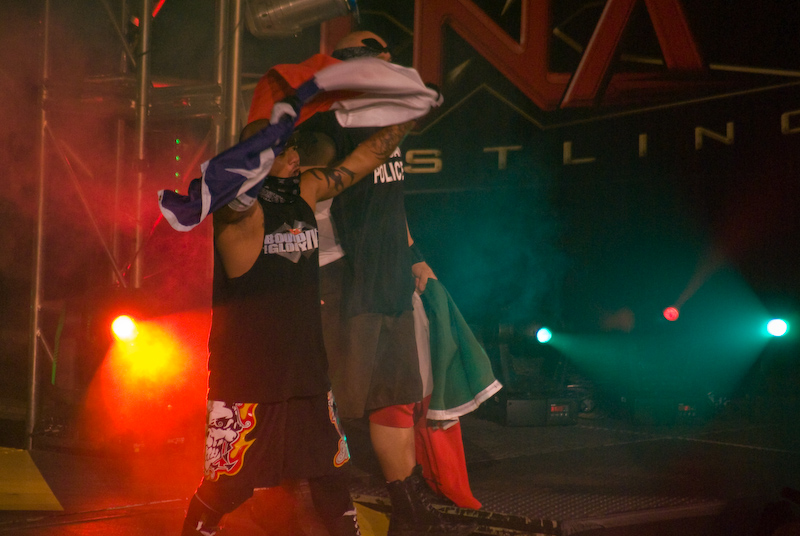
Hernandez and Homicide making their entrance at Bound for Glory in 2008

On the May 1 episode of Impact!, LAX asked Hector Guerrero to be their advisor, which he accepted. On the May 11 pay-per-view Sacrifice, LAX won the vacant TNA Tag Title after defeating Team 3D in the "Deuces Wild" tournament final with help from Guerrero. Afterward, Team 3D attacked Hector and left him beaten, creating another feud between LAX and Team 3D. After defeating 3D to retain the tag straps, they would find themselves in a feud with Beer Money, Inc. (James Storm, Robert Roode and their manager, Jacqueline). Beer Money whipped all four members of LAX with belts, resulting in a Fans' Revenge match being booked for the tag titles at Victory Road. After defeating Beer Money, Inc. at Victory Road, LAX fought them once again for the TNA World Tag Team Championships at Hard Justice this time in a regular two-on-two match. Beer Money, Inc. claimed victory in the match when Roode crashed a beer bottle over Homicide's head, allowing Storm to gain the pinfall, thus ending LAX's four-month reign as champions. At No Surrender, LAX was once again defeated by Beer Money, Inc. when they met for a championship rematch. Before the match, Jacqueline was revealed to have attacked Salinas backstage, and as a result she had to be rushed to the hospital. This was done to write her out of the LAX and their feud with Beer Money on-screen, and explain her departure from TNA shortly before the pay-per-view. On the September 25 episode of Impact! Homicide, Hernandez and Guerrero fought Roode, Storm and Jacqueline in a six-person "Loser's manager leaves town" match. Beer Money, Inc. won the match when Roode pinned Hernandez and as a result of the match Guerrero could no longer manage Homicide and Hernandez in TNA. At Bound for Glory IV LAX competed in a four team Monster's Ball match, but were defeated when Robert Roode pinned Hernandez after Team 3D had put him through a table covered with thumbtacks.

On September 30, 2008, it was announced on Ring of Honor (ROH)'s official website that LAX would be appearing at ROH shows on October 24 and 25. On October 24 in Danbury, Connecticut LAX defeated the ROH World Tag Team Champions Kevin Steen and El Generico, The Age of the Fall (Jimmy Jacobs and Tyler Black) and Chris Hero and Davey Richards in a 30-minute Iron Man match. On October 25, however, they lost to the Briscoe Brothers.

==== Singles success and dissolution (2008–2009) ====
At Final Resolution on December 7, 2008, LAX took part in the second ever "Feast or Fired" match where both members managed to capture a briefcase containing either a shot at the TNA World Heavyweight Championship, X Division Championship or TNA World Tag Team Championship or a Pink Slip. The contents of the briefcases were revealed on the following episode of Impact! resulting in a future TNA World Heavyweight Championship match for Hernandez and an X Division Championship opportunity for Homicide.

The Latin American Xchange debuted in the International Wrestling Association (IWA-PR) on Histeria Boricua, a special event that took place on January 6, 2009. There they were booked against Los Dueños de la Malicia, a tag team composed by Noel Rodríguez and Dennis Rivera. The contest was won by Los Dueños de la Malicia, with Rodríguez pinning Homicide following a distraction on the outside of the ring.

On the edition of January 15, 2009 of Impact! Hernandez cashed in his Feast or Fired opportunity and challenged Sting for the TNA World Heavyweight Championship. Hernandez won via disqualification after the rest of The Main Event Mafia interfered in the match and therefore the belt stayed with Sting. On the edition of January 29 of Impact! Mick Foley announced that due to winning the first match via disqualification Hernandez will get a rematch for the title down the road. On the edition of July 16 of Impact! Homicide cashed in his "Feast or Fired" briefcase to win the X Division Championship from Suicide. After Hernandez returned from a neck surgery on the edition of July 23 of Impact! the team went inactive as both he and Homicide began concentrating on their singles careers. On the edition of September 10 of Impact! Homicide turned on Hernandez and joined the heel faction World Elite effectively ending the partnership between the two. On the March 22, 2010, edition of Impact! there were signs of reconciliation between the former members of LAX as Homicide came out to check on Hernandez, as he was being helped by medics after he had been laid out by his new World Tag Team Championship partner Matt Morgan. However, on August 19, 2010, Homicide was released from TNA.

=== Other promotions (2007–2008; 2011–2015; 2017–2019) ===
LAX made their debut in Jersey All Pro Wrestling (JAPW) on June 9, 2007, defeating Azriel and Jay Lethal to win the JAPW Tag Team Championship. Their first defense was on September 8, 2007, against Low Ki and Samoa Joe. On October 27, 2007, Homicide defeated Low Ki to win the Heavyweight Championship. The same night, LAX and The Strong Style Thugs (B-Boy and Low Ki) wrestled against BLKOUT (Eddie Kingston, Joker, Ruckus, Sabian and Slyk Wagner Brown) for both titles. The match ended when Low Ki covered Homicide, winning the Heavyweight title. LAX lost the tag titles on November 15 to FBI (Nunzio and Tracy Smoothers). Their last JAPW match was on December 13, 2008, defeating The Briscoe Brothers.

LAX made their debut as team in Ring of Honor (ROH) on October 24, 2008, The Return of the 187. LAX won an Iron Team including at El Generico and Kevin Steen and Sweet 'n' Sour Inc. (Chris Hero and Davey Richards) and The Age Of The Fall (Jimmy Jacobs and Tyler Black), with 2-0-1-1. The next day, at Ring of Homicide 2, they were defeated by The Briscoe Brothers. On March 1, 2011, ROH announced that LAX would reunite at the promotion's Manhattan Mayhem IV event on March 19 in Manhattan, New York, where they would take on the ROH World Tag Team Champions, The Kings of Wrestling (Chris Hero and Claudio Castagnoli). On March 19 LAX was defeated by the Kings of Wrestling.

On November 15, 2013, LAX competed in a tournament to crown the first House of Glory Tag Team Champions. LAX defeated Anthony Nese and Ricky Reyes in the first round and Fire Ant and Jigsaw in the semi-finals, before losing to The Young Bucks (Matt and Nick Jackson) in the finals. On September 6, the Chikara promotion announced that LAX, represented by Hernandez, Homicide and new member Chavo Guerrero Jr., would be taking part in the 2014 King of Trios tournament. They were eliminated from the tournament in their first round match on September 19 by the Golden Trio (Dasher Hatfield, Icarus and Mark Angelosetti).

On August 30, 2015, JAPW announced that Homicide, Hernandez and Konnan would reunite as LAX at the promotion's 19th anniversary event on November 14.

On July 15, 2017, LAX made its debut in the World Wrestling League (WWL) for the first time representing the interests of Konnan in the company and face a new problem that came before the Board of Control (in reference to "The Control Board", in reference to PROMESA), directed by Konnan. That problem began to call like "the third generation" two experienced fighters known like Angel Fashion and Mike Mendoza who form a stable after his exit of WWC to debut in the company meeting face to face with Konnan and his plans. Both newcomers from their arrival took the lead in the dressing room to face Konnan and Manny Ferno who became more frustrated as a result of Perez and Mendoza spoiling his plans, requested the intervention of one of Konnan stables, Impact Wrestling Latin American Exchange. Mendoza and Perez, now known collectively as The Third Generation, defeated the Global League Wrestling / Global Impact Team Champions Ortiz and Santana in the first clash between groups.

=== Return to Impact Wrestling (2017–2019) ===
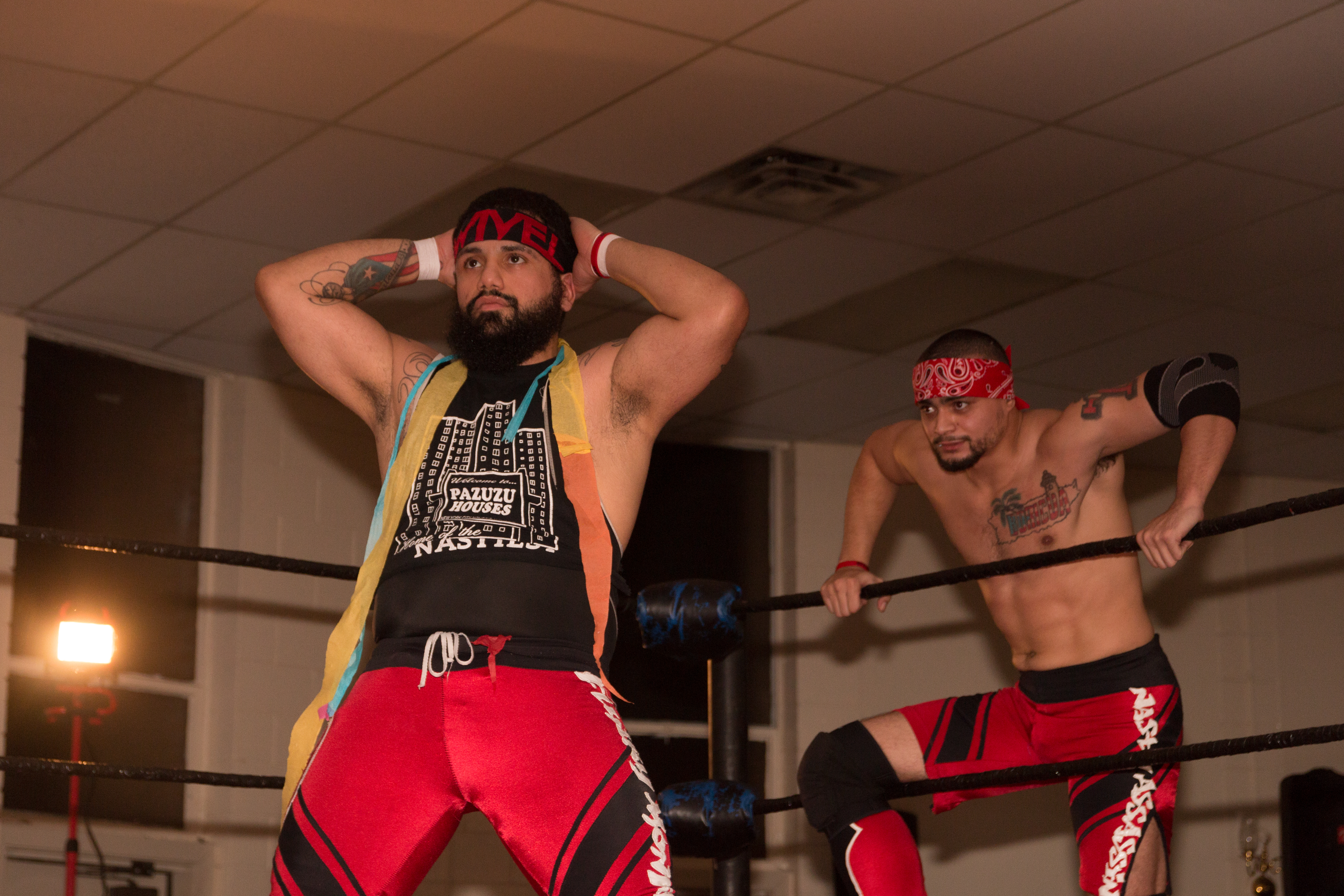
In 2017, Konnan introduced Ortiz and Santana as the new LAX's members

On the March 16, 2017 episode of Impact Wrestling, LAX was reformed with Homicide, Santana and Ortiz, Diamante, and manager Konnan. LAX attacked Decay, Laredo Kid, Garza Jr., and Reno Scum inserting themselves in the Impact World Tag Team Championship picture and winning them the following week, establishing themselves as heels in the process. On the March 30 episode of Impact Wrestling, LAX members Ortiz and Santana defeated Decay, Laredo Kid and Garza Jr. and Reno Scum to win the Impact World Tag Team Championship. On the April 23 episode of Impact Wrestling, LAX defeated Veterans of War (Mayweather and Wilcox) in a tournament finals to win the GFW Tag Team Championship. On November 5 at Bound for Glory, they lost to Ohio Versus Everything (oVe) as part of a double turn with Sami Callihan interfering on oVe's behalf, Jake Crist performing a low blow on Ortiz, and oVe attacking them after the match, thus turning LAX into face in the process.

On the May 24, 2018 episode of Impact King became the newest member of LAX. After the group leader Konnan was attacked, and Homicide and Diamante went missing in action, King assumed leadership of the faction and guided Ortiz and Santana back to being tag team champions. In June, Konnan and Diamante returned, both showing suspicion about King's involvement with the group. On the July 5, 2018 episode of Impact, Konnan confronted King who admitted that it was he who had "taken out a hit" against Konnan to take over the faction. King then attempted to get Ortiz and Santana to recognize him as the new head of the group but they rejected this and stood beside the original leader, Konnan. Then, former LAX members Hernandez and Homicide returned, entering the ring and attacking Konnan's trio. King then took the mic and proclaimed that his trio was LAX. The group would later become known as The OGz. At Bound for Glory on October 14, The OGz lost to LAX in a Concrete Jungle Death match.

On January 12, 2019, The Lucha Bros (Pentagón Jr. and Rey Fénix) defeated LAX during the TV Tapings in Mexico to win the Impact World Tag Team Championship. LAX would reclaim them at the Rebellion pay per view on April 28. They held the titles until July, when they lost them to The North (Ethan Page and Josh Alexander). On July 8, it was revealed that Santana and Ortiz would soon be leaving Impact and had interest from WWE and All Elite Wrestling.

On the August 9 edition of Impact, Daga became the newest member of LAX, teaming with Ortiz in a losing effort to Page and Alexander. Santana did not wrestle at those tapings, however Ortiz and Santana were scheduled to face The North at the August television tapings in Mexico. At those same tapings Santana and Ortiz were given a "send off" by the Impact locker room. Santana confirmed the following day that he and Ortiz were in fact done appearing on Impact Wrestling.

=== Major League Wrestling (2021–present) ===
On July 10, 2021, Konnan introduced LAX 5150 at Major League Wrestling's Battle Riot III event, which debuted with a win over Jordan Oliver and Myron Reed. This version consists of Slice Boogie, Danny Rivera and Julius Smokes. According to Fightful Select, Konnan told Impact Wrestling they would be using the name and Impact agreed to it. At Fightland, Homicide made his return to the group, which began feuding with Azteca Underground's representatives Los Parks (L.A. Park Jr. and El Hijo de L.A. Park) and on November 6, 2021, defeated them for the MLW World Tag Team Championship.

Danny Rivera debuted in IWA-PR at Christmas in PR 2021, teaming with Savio Vega against tag team champions The Owners of Time (Nick Mercer & Leinord White). He quickly became embroiled in a larger angle between IWA-PR and a faction known as International Wrestling Entertainment (IWE) after being attacked. On January 15, 2022, 5150 returned to Puerto Rico and defeated the Owners of Time for the IWA World Tag Team Championship.

== Members ==
=== Current ===
Member	Time
Konnan	December 31, 2005 – June 19, 2007; March 16, 2017 – August 17, 2019; July 10, 2021 – present
Danny Rivera	July 10, 2021 – present
Slice Boogie	July 10, 2021 – present
Julius Smokes	July 10, 2021 – present

=== Former ===
Member	Time
Homicide	December 31, 2005 – September 10, 2009; March 16, 2017 – July 5, 2018; October 2, 2021 – November 6, 2021
Hernandez	March 31, 2006 – September 10, 2009
Apolo	December 31, 2005 – February 12, 2006
Machete	February 12, 2006 – March 18, 2007
Jack Meléndez (ring announcer)	December 31, 2005 – October 1, 2006
Héctor Guerrero (manager)	May 1, 2008 – September 25, 2008
Salinas (valet)	January 6, 2008 – September 14, 2008
Diamante	March 16, 2017 – January 28, 2019
Ortiz	March 16, 2017 – August 17, 2019
Santana	March 16, 2017 – August 17, 2019
Low Ki	August 3, 2017 – August 23, 2017
King	April 25, 2018 – July 5, 2018
Daga	July 20, 2019 – August 19, 2019

== Championships and accomplishments ==
=== Hernandez and Homicide ===
- Fighting Spirit magazine
  - The Heyman Award (2006)
- International Wrestling Association
  - IWA World Tag Team Championship (1 time)
- Jersey All Pro Wrestling
  - JAPW Heavyweight Championship (1 time) – Homicide
  - JAPW Tag Team Championship (1 time)
- River City Wrestling (San Antonio)
  - RCW Tag Team Championship (1 time)
- Total Nonstop Action Wrestling
  - NWA World Tag Team Championship (2 times)
  - TNA World Tag Team Championship (1 times)
  - Deuces Wild Tag Team Tournament (2008)
  - Feast or Fired (2008 – World Heavyweight Championship contract) – Hernandez
  - Feast or Fired (2008 – X Division Championship contract) – Homicide
  - TNA Year End Award (1 time)
    - Match of the Year (2006) vs. A.J. Styles and Christopher Daniels at No Surrender
- Wrestling Observer Newsletter
  - Best Gimmick (2006)
  - Tag Team of the Year (2006)

=== Ortiz and Santana ===
- AAW: Professional Wrestling Redefined
  - AAW Tag Team Championship (1 time)
- House of Glory
  - HOG Tag Team Championship (1 time)
- Impact Wrestling
  - GFW Tag Team Championship (1 time)
  - Impact World Tag Team Championship (4 times)
  - Impact Year End Award (1 time)
    - Tag Team of the Year (2018)
- WrestlePro
  - WrestlePro Tag Team Championship (1 time)
- The Wrestling Revolver
  - Revolver Tag Team Championship (1 time)
- World Wrestling League
  - WWL World Tag Team Championship (1 time)

=== Danny Rivera and Slice Boogie ===
- International Wrestling Association
  - IWA World Tag Team Championship (1 time)
- Major League Wrestling
  - MLW World Tag Team Championship (1 time)

== See also ==
- Latino World Order
- Mexican America
