= E. J. Nduka =

American football player and professional wrestler (born 1988)

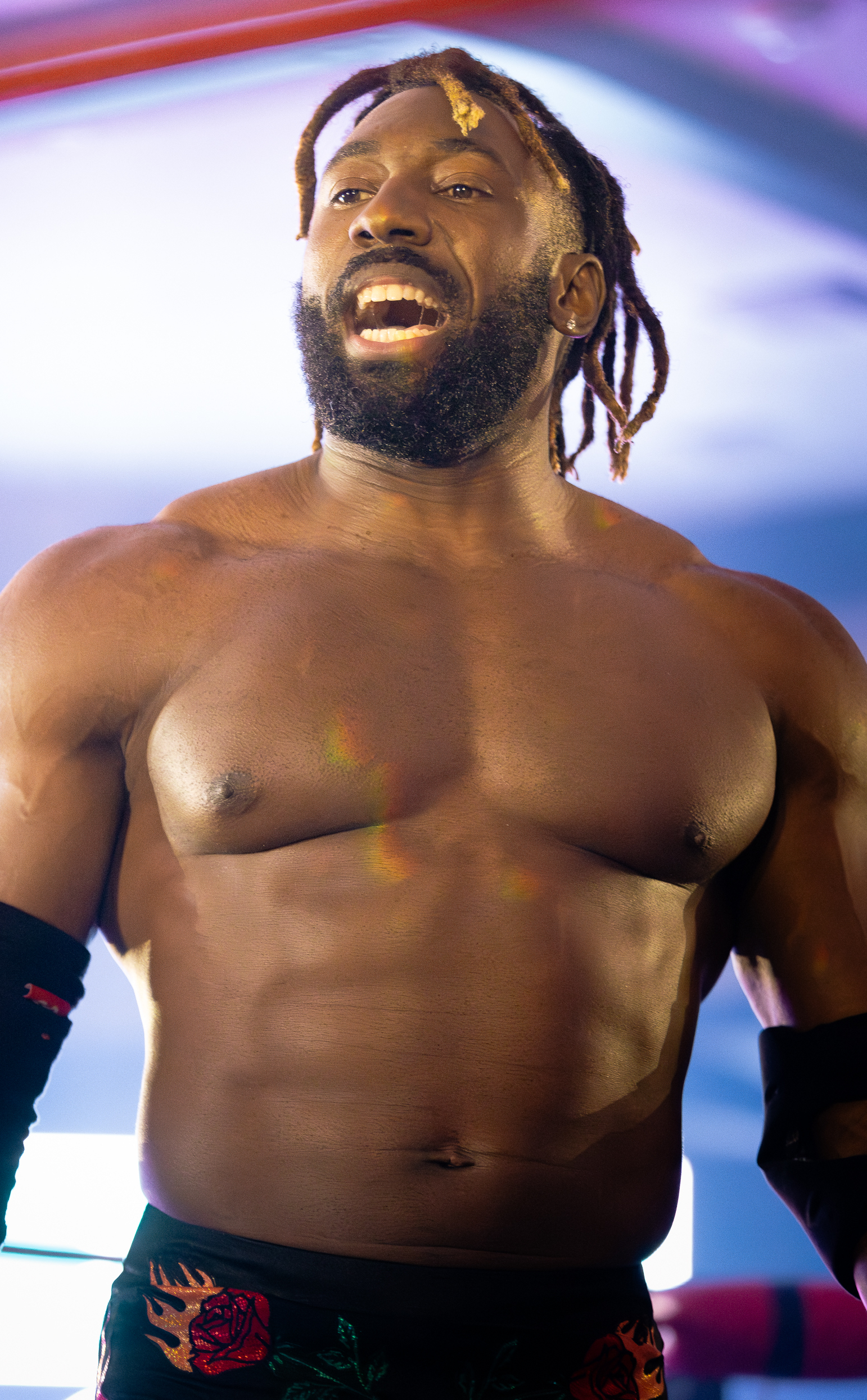
- Nduka in March 2024

Personal information
- Born: Ezekwesiri Nduka Jr. August 28, 1989 (age 37) Dallas, Texas, U.S.
- Education: Sam Houston State University
- Spouse: Bethany Tate (m. 2017)

Professional wrestling career
- Ring name(s): EJ Nduka; Ezra Judge
- Billed height: 6 ft 8 in (203 cm)
- Billed weight: 285 lb (129 kg)
- Billed from: Dallas, Texas
- Trained by: WWE Performance Center
- Debut: February 29, 2018

Ezekwesiri "EJ" Nduka Jr. (born August 28, 1989) is an American professional wrestler, professional IFBB bodybuilder, and former professional football defensive end / outside linebacker. He currently performs on the independent circuit. He is best known for his time in All Elite Wrestling (AEW) and in their sister promotion Ring of Honor (ROH). He is also known for his time with Major League Wrestling (MLW), where he was a former one-time MLW World Tag Team Champion, and in WWE, where he performed under the ring name Ezra Judge.

Nduka played college football at Sam Houston State University, with the team being the 2012 National Championship runners-up. Professionally, Nduka has been a member of the Tri-Cities Fever, Allen Wranglers, Toronto Argonauts and San Antonio Talons.

Nduka is also a professional bodybuilder in the International Federation of Bodybuilding and Fitness. Nduka previously completed for the MuscleMania Professional Division. During the World Championships in Vegas, Nduka placed 4th in the Men's Physique Professional Division. Nduka began his bodybuilding career shortly after leaving the Arena Football League (AFL) in 2016. Since then, he has placed first in the Texas State Championships, Ronnie Coleman Classic, BetterBodies Championship, Junior Nationals and JR USAs. Nduka has also competed at the Arnold Classic & Lou Ferrigno Legacy Classic, placing in the top three in the Classic Pro Division. In August 2019 Nduka was signed by the WWE, reporting to their developmental territory NXT.

== Early life ==
Nduka was born in Dallas, Texas, to parents Obie and Prince Nduka, who are originally from Nigeria. EJ Nduka attended Jackson Memorial High School in Jackson, New Jersey. He was a dual sport letterwinner and star in basketball, and track. He was a star basketball player before ultimately turning to the football field in college.

== Football career ==
E. J. Nduka
Profile
- Positions: Defensive end, outside linebacker

Personal information
- Born: August 28, 1989 (age 37); Dallas, Texas
- Listed height: 6 ft 8 in (2.03 m)
- Listed weight: 285 lb (129 kg)

Career information
- High school: Jackson (NJ) Memorial
- College: Sam Houston State
- NFL draft: 2012: undrafted

Career history
- Allen Wranglers/Texas Revolution (2012–2013); Toronto Argonauts (2013); Tri-Cities Fever (2014); San Antonio Talons (2014)

=== College ===
Nduka began his college career at Jacksonville University in 2007 before transferring to Sam Houston State where he played for three years from 2008 to 2011. He was redshirted as a freshman in 2008 but eventually made an impact for the Bearkats, primarily as a pass rusher in game situations.

=== Professional leagues ===
==== Pre-draft ====
Pre-draft measurables
Height	Weight	40-yard dash	10-yard split	20-yard split	20-yard shuttle	Three-cone drill	Vertical jump	Broad jump	Bench press	Wonderlic
6 ft 6.5 in (1.99 m)	252 lb (114 kg)	4.52 s	1.36 s	2.55 s	4.44 s	6.56 s	42 in (1.07 m)	10 ft 2 in (3.10 m)	33 reps	x
Values from NFL Super Regional Combine

Prior to the 2012 NFL Draft, Nduka was projected to be undrafted by NFLDraftScout.com. He was rated as the 36th-best outside linebacker in the draft. Nduka was later signed by the Allen Wranglers of the Indoor Football League. In 2012, Nduka played final three games and recorded 15 tackles, three sacks, 1 forced fumble and 1 fumble recovery.

On February 21, 2013, the Toronto Argonauts of the Canadian Football League signed Nduka. He was released by the Argonauts on May 8, 2013. In 2015, Nduka had private workouts and NFL camps with Texans, Seahawks & Falcons.

== Bodybuilding career ==
Nduka is a professional athlete in the IFBB a federation. Nduka recently announced via social media that he will now compete in the Classic Physique division in 2017.

=== IFBB Pro Bodybuilder contest results ===
- 2016 IFBB - San Antonio Classic 3rd
- 2016 IFBB - Lou Ferrigno Classic 3rd
- 2017 IFBB - IFBB Tournament of Champions 16th
- 2017 IFBB - Pacific USA Pro 8th
- 2017 IFBB - Fit World Pro 9th
- 2017 IFBB - Karina Nascimento Pro 7th
- 2017 IFBB - Pittsburgh Pro
- 2018 IFBB - Governors Cup 11th
- 2018 IFBB - Hawaii Pro 11th
- 2018 IFBB - Salt City Showdown 8th
- 2018 IFBB - IFBB City Limits Pro 7th
- 2018 IFBB - Nebraska Pro 6th

=== NPC contest results ===
- 2015 NPC - BetterBodies Championships 1st
- 2015 NPC - Ronnie Coleman Classic 1st
- 2015 NPC - Team Universe 6th
- 2015 NPC/IFBB - North Americans 4th
- 2015 NPC - Miami Nationals 3rd
- 2016 - Jr Nationals 1st
- 2016 - Jr USAs 1st

== Professional wrestling career ==
Because of his performance on the gridiron and on the IFBB stage, in December 2018, Nduka received a tryout with the WWE, and then shortly after went back in April 2019 for another tryout at the WWE Performance Center. After participating on two tryouts (the first in December 2018, the second in April 2019), Nduka signed a contract with WWE on August 15, 2019. He was assigned to the Performance Center and began to work under the ring name of Ezra Judge. On May 19, 2021, Nduka was released from his WWE contract.

On June 24, 2021, it was revealed as part of their MLW Open Draft that Nduka (now going by his real name) had signed with Major League Wrestling (MLW). On July 24, 2021, during Nduka's televised debut, EJ Nduka made a statement within the company as eliminated 12 participants – nearly a third of all Battle Riot participants – breaking the record by a landslide. He would ultimately join Alexander Hammerstone and Richard Holliday as part of The Dynasty. During Wrestlemania 38 weekend Nduka and Calvin Tankman defeated 5150 to become MLW World Tag Team Champions at the Grady Cole Center in North Carolina at a sold-out event. On January 7, 2023, Nduka and Calvin lost their MLW World Tag Team Championships to The Samoan SWAT Team's Juice Finau and Lance Anoa'i at MLW's pay-per-view Blood and Thunder of year 2023. Earlier, it was revealed that Nduka's MLW contract was coming to an end after Blood and Thunder, choosing not to renew it.

Nduka made his All Elite Wrestling (AEW) debut on the January 28, 2023 episode AEW Dark, in a losing effort against Konosuke Takeshita. In June 2023, it was reported by Wrestling Observer that Nduka had signed with AEW. On the June 29 episode of AEW Collision, Nduka made another appearance accompanying AEW World Champion Swerve Strickland during the weigh-in for Strickland's match against Will Ospreay. In October 2024, Nduka formed a tag team with Lee Johnson named "LEEJ". In December 2024 at Final Battle Zero Hour, LEEJ turned heel after by attacking Gates of Agony (Bishop Kaun and Toa Liona) after losing to them in a tag match. In May 2025, it was reported Nduka was a free agent after his AEW contract expired and was not renewed.

== Championships and accomplishments ==
- Major League Wrestling
  - MLW World Tag Team Championship (1 time) – with Calvin Tankman
- Reality of Wrestling
  - ROW Tag Team Championship (1 time) – with Sam Holloway

== See also ==
- List of gridiron football players who became professional wrestlers
