= L. A. Park Jr. =

Mexican professional wrestler

Personal information
- Born: June 1, 2000 (age 26) Monterrey, Nuevo León, Mexico
- Parent: L.A. Park (father)
- Relatives: El Hijo de L.A. Park (brother); El Hijo de Cien Caras (uncle); Super Parka (great-uncle); Volador Jr. (first cousin once removed)

Professional wrestling career
- Ring names: Exudus; L.A. Park Jr.; Último Sadox
- Billed height: 188 cm (6 ft 2 in)
- Billed weight: 122kg
- Trained by: L.A. Park; Garringo
- Debut: 2018

L. A. Park Jr. (born June 1, 2000) is the ring name of a Mexican professional wrestler. He currently works for Lucha Libre AAA Worldwide as a freelancer as well as on the independent circuit. He also competed in Major League Wrestling from 2019 to 2022. His real name is not a matter of public record, as is often the case with masked wrestlers in Mexico, where their private lives are kept a secret from the wrestling fans. L. A. Park Jr. is the younger son of L.A. Park and the younger brother of El Hijo de L.A. Park.

== Professional wrestling career ==
=== Freelance/AAA (January 2019—2020) ===
On January 27, 2019, L.A Park Jr. made his debut on the independent circuit of Mexico. Prior to his appearance as L.A. Park Jr., he would wrestle under the name Ultimo Sadox. In his first match on the indies as L.A. Park Jr., he would team with his brother, El Hijo de L.A. Park, against El Hijo del Dr. Wagner Jr. and Galeno del Mal. The brothers would win this bout. L.A. Park Jr.'s next appearance would be on February 17 of that same year, and he would once again be competing in tag-team action. This time, he would team with Baby Extreme in another win, this time over Azrael and Muerte Extrema. This match was also L.A. Park Jr.'s debut match in KAOZ Lucha Libre. Following this, L.A Park Jr. would debut in yet another promotion, this time G21 (Generacion XXI), on March 5. In his first match with the company, he would team up with Aeroboy against Maquina Infernal I and II. This was yet another win for the young wrestler. He would make another appearance for G21 the next night, teaming with his brother and Diamante Azul in a winning effort against Gran Guerrero, Kastigador, and La Bestia Del Ring. His next appearance on March 23 would end in DQ win for him and El Hijo de L.A. Park against Diamante Azul and Mr. Niebla. His first loss would come at a KAOZ Lucha Libre event on April 23. The match would see L.A. Park Jr. team with Baby Extreme and Epydemius against Black Taurus, Hijo Del Volador, and Zumbi. Following this, he would make several more appearances for G21, as well as KAOZ, Lucha Time, Nación Lucha Libre, CMLL (Consejo Mundial De Lucha Libre), PWM (Pro Wrestling Mexico), and AMLL (Alianza Metropolitana De Lucha Libre). On August 31, 2019, L.A. Park Jr. made his first appearance for Lucha Libre AAA Worldwide at a cross-promotional event with LEGEND Promociones. On the night, L.A. Park Jr., as a part of La Familia Real, alongside El Hijo de L.A. Park, took on Galeno Del Mal and Hijo de Silver King. La Familia Real won via disqualification. On October 5, 2019, at a cross-promotional event held by The Crash and MLW (Major League Wrestling), L.A. Park Jr. and El Hijo de L.A. Park faced MLW World Tag-Team Champions, The Dynasty (MJF and Richard Holiday) for the titles, ultimately losing. This was L.A Park Jr.'s first appearance in MLW. L.A. Park Jr. would continue to bounce around the indies and compete for AAA for the rest of 2019, then into 2020. On the 23rd of February, 2020, with El Hijo de L.A. Park and El Bestia Del Ring, L.A. Park Jr. took on the team of El Hijo de Dr. Wagner Jr., Galeno Del Mal, and Silver Jr. for the KAOZ Trios Championships. The former team won that match and the titles.

=== Major League Wrestling (2020—2022) ===
Following the pandemic and a short hiatus from L.A. Park Jr., he signed with MLW officially in September, but wouldn't debut in-ring until December. Although he was signed on to MLW, he would still compete in the indies and AAA. His first match as an official part of the MLW roster was on the 16th December, 2020 episode of MLW: Fusion against Bu Ku Dao, he lost in his first match in the company. After this, L.A. Park Jr. wouldn't wrestle an official match in MLW until the 2nd of October, 2021. In that time, he once again bounced around the independent circuit for a while and his father and brother won the MLW World Tag Team Championships. On the 2nd October, 2021 episode of MLW: Fusion ALPHA, Los Parks (L.A. Park and El Hijo de L.A. Park, and L.A. Park) faced 5150 (Homicide, Rivera, and Slice Boogie) in a match that ended in a no contest. In the time between this match and the next, L.A. Park Jr. wrestled a few more dates in the indies, including one where he won the IWC Tag Team Titles with El Hijo de L.A. Park. Then, on the 6th November episode of MLW: Fusion ALPHA, Los Parks (El Hijo de L.A. Park and L.A. Park Jr.) once again took on 5150 (RIvera and Slice Boogie), in a street fight with their MLW World Tag Team Championships on the line. Los Parks wound up losing the match and the titles. The feud between 5150 and Los Parks came to an end on the 21st of January, 2021 episode of MLW: Fusion in a ladder match for the championships. 5150 defeated Los Parks and retained their titles. L.A. Park Jr. would continue to make sporadic appearances in MLW and other promotions through the rest of 2021. On April 1, 2022, L.A. Park Jr., El Hijo de L.A. Park, and L.A. Park, were all sent home as a result of them "going into business for themselves" during a scheduled run-in spot on MLW: Intimidation Games the night prior. The spot was to see Los Parks run-in and beat down Jacob Fatu, Mads Krügger, and Alexander Hammerstone, setting up a future program between the six men. During the run-in, the Park family delivered real punches, chair shots, and busting open Fatu and Hammerstone. Following the incident, all three members of Los Parks were let go from their MLW contracts.

=== Back to the indies and AAA (2022—present) ===
Following his release from MLW, L.A. Park Jr. went back to working the independent circuit as well as continuing his work for AAA. On the 17th of November, 2023, he won the AULL Tag Team Championships with his brother in a four way tag-team match. The reign last until the 3rd of August 2024, when they lost the titles to the current holders Los Traumas. Since then, L.A. Park Jr. has worked the independent circuit.

== Championships and accomplishments ==
- Kaoz Lucha Libre
  - Kaoz Trios Championship (1 time) – with El Hijo de L.A. Park and La Bestia del Ring
- Alianza Universal de Lucha Libre
  - AULL Tag Team Championship (1 time) - with El Hijo de L.A. Park
