= Injustice (professional wrestling) =

Stable
- Members: Jordan Oliver; Myron Reed; Rich Swann; Kotto Brazil; Saieve Al Sabah
- Debut: July 25, 2019
- Disbanded: October 29, 2021

Injustice was a professional wrestling stable in Major League Wrestling (MLW) between 2019 and 2021.

== History ==
On the February 16, 2019 episode of Fusion, Ace Austin defeated Rich Swann in a middleweight match. Swann was frustrated at the referee Doug Markham's biased officiating, which led to Swann attacking him and announcer Rich Bocchini in rage. As a result, the MLW management suspended Swann (in storyline). Swann appealed against the suspension but his appeal was rejected. Fellow middleweight Myron Reed protested against Swann's suspension and even wrote "Free Swann" with a tape on his mouth. On the March 23 episode of Fusion, Reed lost a match to Gringo Loco due to being distracted with his "Free Swann" movement and attacked the referee in response, which led to management suspending him as well for six weeks. Swann was reinstated a few days later and upon Reed's return, the two began a "Justice" movement in protest against biased officiating by the referees primarily Markham. Markham would accuse the two of harassment.

Shortly after, Swann left MLW while Reed formed an alliance with Jordan Oliver at Kings of Colosseum where Oliver helped Reed in defeating Rey Horus. The duo would soon be joined by Kotto Brazil, who also protested over biased officiating. On July 22, MLW.com announced that the three would be forming a group called "Injustice". They competed in their first match as a trio on the August 31 episode of Fusion, where they defeated Air Wolf, Gringo Loco and Zenshi in a six-man tag team match. They continued to feud with various middleweights over the next few months and defeated Gringo Loco, Puma King and Septimo Dragon in a trios match at MLW's first-ever pay-per-view event Saturday Night SuperFight.

On the November 11 episode of Fusion, Reed defeated Teddy Hart to win the World Middleweight Championship after Contra Unit member Josef Samael threw a fireball into Hart's face. Oliver and Brazil would defeat Gringo Loco and Zenshi in an elimination tag team match on the November 28 episode of Fusion. On the December 14 episode of Fusion, Injustice protested on not being selected into the Opera Cup tournament but were challenged by King Mo and the returning A. C. H. to a tag team match, which Oliver and Brazil lost.

The storyline between Injustice and the luchadores continued well into the new year. On the January 25, 2020 episode of Fusion (taped January 11), Drago and Puma King defeated Injustice, in a three-way match also involving Black Taurus and Low Rider. On the February 2 episode of Fusion (taped January 11), Oliver was ringside for Reed's middleweight title match with Drago, and interfered towards the end to help Reed retain the belt. At the same time, the stable also started feuding with Brian Pillman Jr., who made his presence known after Oliver and Brazil defeated Laredo Kid and Zenshi on the February 29 episode of Fusion (taped February 1). A singles match between Oliver and Pillman was scheduled on Fusion, but it was prevented from happening due to Injustice attacking Pillman. As a result, Injustice were suspended by MLW, and they returned on the May 2 episode of Fusion (taped March 13), unsuccessfully challenging Los Jinetes del Aire (El Hijo del Vikingo, Myzteziz Jr. and Octagon Jr.) for the AAA World Trios Championship.

Contra Unit attacked MLW at the end of the trios match with Brazil being taken out. Oliver, now a newly minted heavyweight, began calling out Contra Unit, specifically World Heavyweight Champion Jacob Fatu and Simon Gotch. On the August 6 episode of Pulp Fusion, Oliver was jumped by Gotch and put out with a chokehold. On the December 9 episode of Fusion, Oliver gained a measure of revenge, jumping Gotch during a schmoz ending to Contra Unit's World Tag Team Championship match against Marshall and Ross Von Erich. Although a grudge match between the two was scheduled for Kings of Colosseum, at the event it appeared that Gotch had no-showed and the match was postponed. However, this turned out to be a ruse, as later in the night and after Reed's latest title defense, Injustice were ambushed by Contra Unit. As a result, Injustice turned face, although on the January 20, 2021 episode of Fusion, Gotch defeated Oliver by referee's decision. Later in the episode, Oliver and Reed disguised themselves as flag bearers and attacked Fatu and Daivari, before being chased off by Gotch and Mads Krügger. On the February 3 episode of Fusion, Oliver squashed a nameless member of the Sentai Death Squad. His match was bookended by two promos: the first with Reed challenging Contra Unit to a tag team match, and the second with Oliver warning Fatu that he was coming for his title. On the February 10 episode of Fusion, the tag team match ended up not happening as Fatu jumped Injustice, but Oliver and Reed managed to isolate Fatu and hit him with a superkick-springboard cutter combination, before being dragged away by officials. On the March 3 episode of Fusion, Oliver was defeated by Fatu, and afterwards, he and Reed were prevented from being put in Contra Unit's trademark body bags as Calvin Tankman ran in to make the save. On the March 11 episode of Fusion, Injustice challenged Los Parks (L. A. Park and El Hijo de L.A. Park) for the World Tag Team Championship; this was changed to a triple threat match on the March 18 episode of Fusion when Contra Unit attacked Injustice. Los Parks retained over Injustice and Contra Unit, with Oliver taking the pin. On March 31, at Never Say Never, Oliver defeated Gotch in a rematch of their January encounter, ending his and Injustice's feud with Contra Unit.

Oliver was released from MLW on October 29, thus disbanding Injustice in the process.

== Championships and accomplishments ==
- Major League Wrestling
  - MLW World Middleweight Championship (2 time) – Reed
