= Calvin Tankman =

American semi professional wrestler

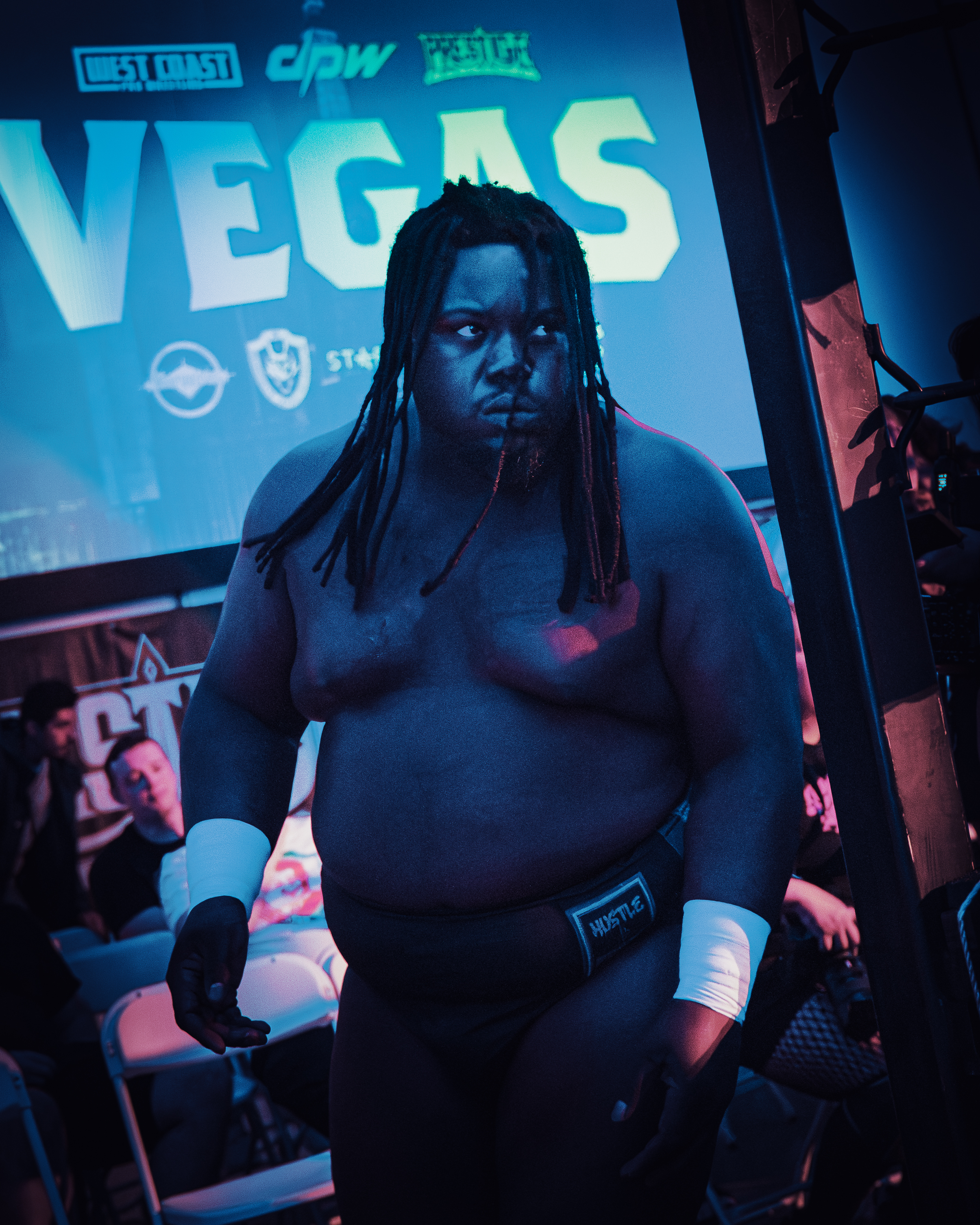
- Tankman in April 2025

Personal information
- Born: Christopher Heyward III; December 22, 1994 (age 31) Muncie, Indiana, U.S.

Professional wrestling career
- Ring name: Calvin Tankman
- Billed height: 1.88 m (6 ft 2 in)
- Billed weight: 355 lb (161 kg)
- Debut: 2016

Christopher Heyward III, better known by the ring name Calvin Tankman, is an American Professional Wrestler, currently performing on the independent circuit. He is best known for his tenures with Major League Wrestling (MLW), IWA Mid-South (IWA), and Wild Championship Wrestling Outlaws (WCWO).

== Professional wrestling career ==
=== IWA Mid-South (2016–2020) ===
One of his first matches as a professional wrestler was at IWA Mid-South's 20th Anniversary Show on October 6, 2016, where he competed in a 20-man rumble match against other superstars such as the winner Randi West, Ian Rotten and Trey Miguel. Heyward is known for his tenure with IWA Mid-South, where he was a former IWA Mid-South Heavyweight Champion, title which he won at IWA Mid-South Spring Heat 2018 on April 12 after defeating Mance Warner. At IWA Mid-South A Hard Day's Night on January 19, 2018, he unsuccessfully defended Eddie Kingston and Homicide's IWA Mid-South Tag Team Championship alone against Unfortunate Pairing (Elliott Paul and Pat Monix) in a 2-on-1 handicap match, being still unknown if he was recognized champion or not. He did have another successful defense alongside at Homicide IWA Mid-South Simply The Best 11 December 14, 2017, against Jake Parnell and Shane Mercer. His last appearance for IWA was at IWA Mid-South Card Subject To Change on December 19, 2020, where he fell short to Vincent Nothing.

=== Major League Wrestling (2020–2023) ===
Heyward made his first appearance for Major League Wrestling (MLW) on the November 25, 2020, episode of Fusion, where he scored a victory against enhancement talent Robert Martyr. He was heavily pushed with wins over Zenshi and the AAA World Cruiserweight Champion Laredo Kid in a non-title match on Fusion. At Never Say Never on March 31, 2021, Heyward unsuccessfully challenged Jacob Fatu for the MLW World Heavyweight Championship.

On February 26, 2022, Calvin Tankman and a tag team wrestling partner of his by the name of E. J. Nduka defeated 5150 (Danny Rivera and Slice Boogie) and became the MLW World Tag Team Champions at the Grady Cole Center in North Carolina event that was sold out.

On January 7, 2023, Calvin and his tag team partner Nduka lost their MLW World Tag Team Championships to The Samoan SWAT Team's Juicy Finau and Lance Anoa'i at MLW's pay-per-view Blood and Thunder of year 2023.

=== Game Changer Wrestling (2020–present) ===
At Game Changer Wrestling's Joey Janela's Spring Break 4 from October 10, 2020, Heyward participated in a 30-person battle royal where he competed against various wrestlers such as the winner Nate Webb, Shark Boy, JTG, Flash Flanagan, Marko Stunt and Joey Janela. He also competed at GCW Josh Barnett's Bloodsport 3 on October 11, 2020, an event produced by Game Changer Wrestling in partnership with Josh Barnett, where he defeated Alexander James by way of knockout. At GCW Josh Barnett's Bloodsport 4 February 13, 2021, he fell short to Davey Boy Smith Jr. by way of submission. At GCW Josh Barnett's Bloodsport 5 from February 20, 2021, Heyward scored a victory against Nolan Edward by way of knockout.

== Championships and accomplishments ==
- AAW Wrestling
  - AAW Tag Team Championship (1 time) – with Jah-C
- Atlanta Wrestling Entertainment
  - AWE Stunna Rumble (2018)
- Bizarro Lucha
  - Bizarro Lucha Luchaversal Championship (1 time)
- Glory Pro Wrestling
  - Crown of Glory Championship (1 time)
- Black Label Pro
  - BLP Heavyweight Championship (2 times)
  - BLP Midwest Championship (1 time)
- Deadlock Pro-Wrestling
  - DPW Worlds Championship (1 time)
  - DPW National Championship (1 time, inaugural)
  - DPW National Championship Tournament (2022)
- Freelance Underground
  - FU Heavyweight Championship (1 time)
- Freelance Wrestling
  - Freelance World Tag Team Championship (1 time) – with Shane Mercer
- IWA Mid-South
  - IWA Mid-South Heavyweight Championship (1 time)
- Major League Wrestling
  - MLW World Tag Team Championship (1 time) – with E. J. Nduka
- New Wave Pro Wrestling
  - NWP Crossroads Championship (1 time)
- Paradigm Pro Wrestling
  - MidwestTerritory.com Championship (1 time)
  - MidwestTerritory.com Interim Championship (1 time)
- Pro Wrestling Illustrated
  - Ranked No. 134 of the top 500 singles wrestlers in the PWI 500 in 2021
  - Ranked No. 138 of the top 500 singles wrestlers in the PWI 500 in 2022
- Wild Championship Wrestling Outlaws
  - WCWO Fight Or Die Championship (1 time)
  - WCWO Territorial Championship (1 time)
  - WCWO Tag Team Championship (1 time) – with Dale Patricks
- Wrestling Theology Fellowship
  - WTF Championship (1 time)
  - Blizzard Brawl (2018)
