= Myron Reed (wrestler) =

American professional wrestler

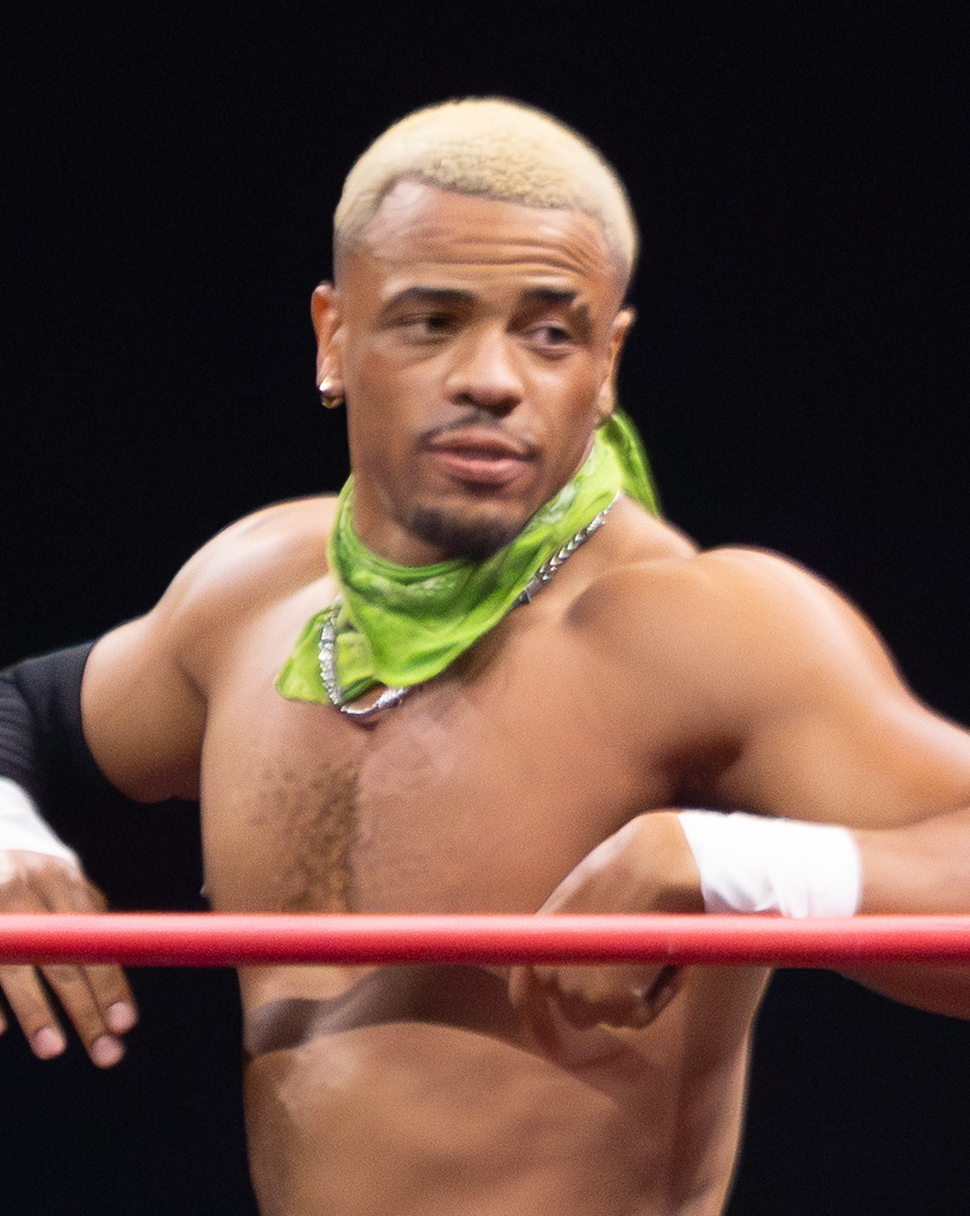
- Reed in May 2026

Personal information
- Born: June 9, 1996 (age 30) Louisville, Kentucky, U.S.
- Spouse: Killer Kelly
- Children: 3

Professional wrestling career
- Ring name(s): Myron Reed; Brother Reed; The Bad Reed; Tyler Reed
- Billed height: 6 ft 0 in (1.83 m)
- Billed weight: 172 lb (78 kg)
- Trained by: AR Fox; WWA4 Wrestling School
- Debut: March 23, 2016

Myron Reed (born June 9, 1996) is an American professional wrestler. He is signed to All Elite Wrestling (AEW), where he is a member of The Rascalz. He also makes appearances on the independent circuit and AEW's sister promotion Ring of Honor (ROH). He is also known for his time in Major League Wrestling (MLW) and Total Nonstop Action Wrestling (TNA).

== Professional wrestling career ==
=== Independent circuit (2016–present) ===
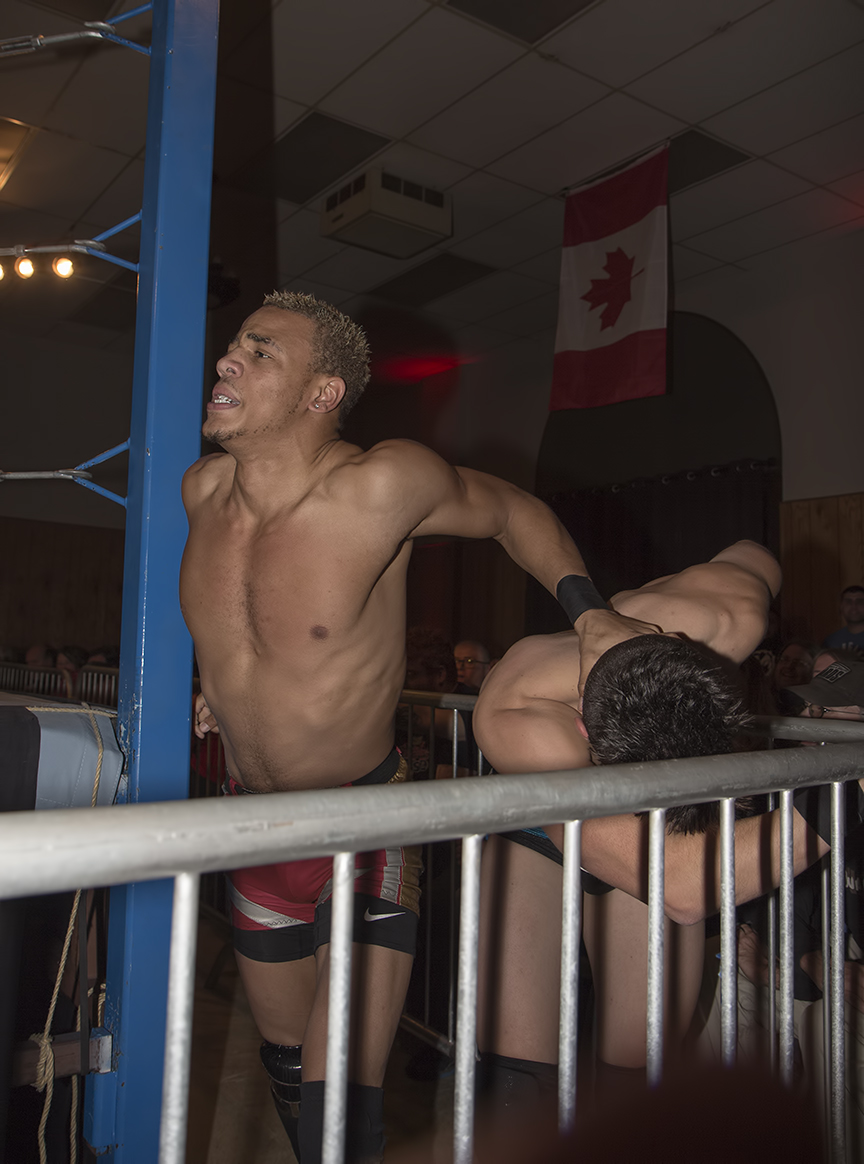
Reed (left) in December 2017 in a match against Sammy Guevara

Reed initially started his career in wrestling on YouTube where he competed in backyard wrestling, going by the names The Bad Reed and Tyler Reed. His first stint as a professional wrestler was at the Kentucky-based World Wrestling Alliance where he went by the name Brother Reed.

On June 4, 2017 Myron Reed made his Ring of Honor (ROH) debut on an episode of Ring of Honor Wrestlings Future of Honor as he defeated Curt Stallion. On October 14, 2023 Myron made his return to ROH on an episode of Honor Club as he and Ren Jones faced Cole Karter & Griff Garrison but we're unsuccessful.

On April 7, 2018, Myron Reed and his then tag team partner Trey Miguel were added to The Rascalz as new members of the stable by Dezmond Xavier and Zachary Wentz in Combat Zone Wrestling at Welcome to the Combat Zone. They defeated Bandido and Flamita and Ohio Versus Everything in a three-way match. At FCP's International Tekkers: Nothing Is True, Everything Is Permitted, Xavier and Wentz captured The Wrestling Revolver's PWR Tag Team Championship by defeating the defending champions Millie McKenzie and Pete Dunne and The Besties In The World (Davey Vega and Mat Fitchett) in a three-way match. They successfully defended the titles in a one-night tag team tournament against Killer Death Machines (Jessicka Havok and Nevaeh), The Crew (Jason Cade and Shane Strickland) and The Latin American Exchange (Santana and Ortiz) at Catalina Wrestling Mixer 2. Miguel and Reed also participated in the tournament, losing to Besties in the World in the opening round. Rascalz held the PWR Tag Team Championship until It's Always Sunny In Iowa on March 3, 2019, where they lost the titles to Latin American Exchange in a three-way match, also involving Besties in the World. Reed would leave the group after Miguel, Xavier and Wentz signed with Impact Wrestling as Reed strayed from the group to another wrestling promotion.

On June 9, 2022, it was announced that The Rascalz would be reforming with Miguel, Wentz and Reed to face the team of Blake Christian, Nick Wayne and Fuego Del Sol at Warrior Wrestling 24 on June 26.

On February 15, 2023, Reed and Miguel, competing as The Rascalz, captured Insane Wrestling Revolution's IWR World Tag Team Championship. Also a video of a match would go on to be licensed by Impact Wrestling and posted in full to Impact's YouTube channel as a Digital Media Exclusive on May 7, 2023, of the two also taking on The Death Threat Army in tag team action and being successful.

On December 10, 2024, after winning Wrestling REVOLVER's REVOLVER World Championship, Reed, disgruntled that he does not have the same opportunities as his stablemates in the top wrestling promotions, announced his departure from The Rascalz. After his departure, Reed defeated his former stablemates Wentz at Game Changer Wrestling (GCW) Thank Me Later on January 11, 2025 and Miguel in his REVOLVER World Championship title defense at Wrestling REVOLVER Square Game on January 31. At Wrestling REVOLVER Unreal on May 31, Reed suffered a concussion during his title match against Dante Leon.

=== Major League Wrestling (2018–2023) ===
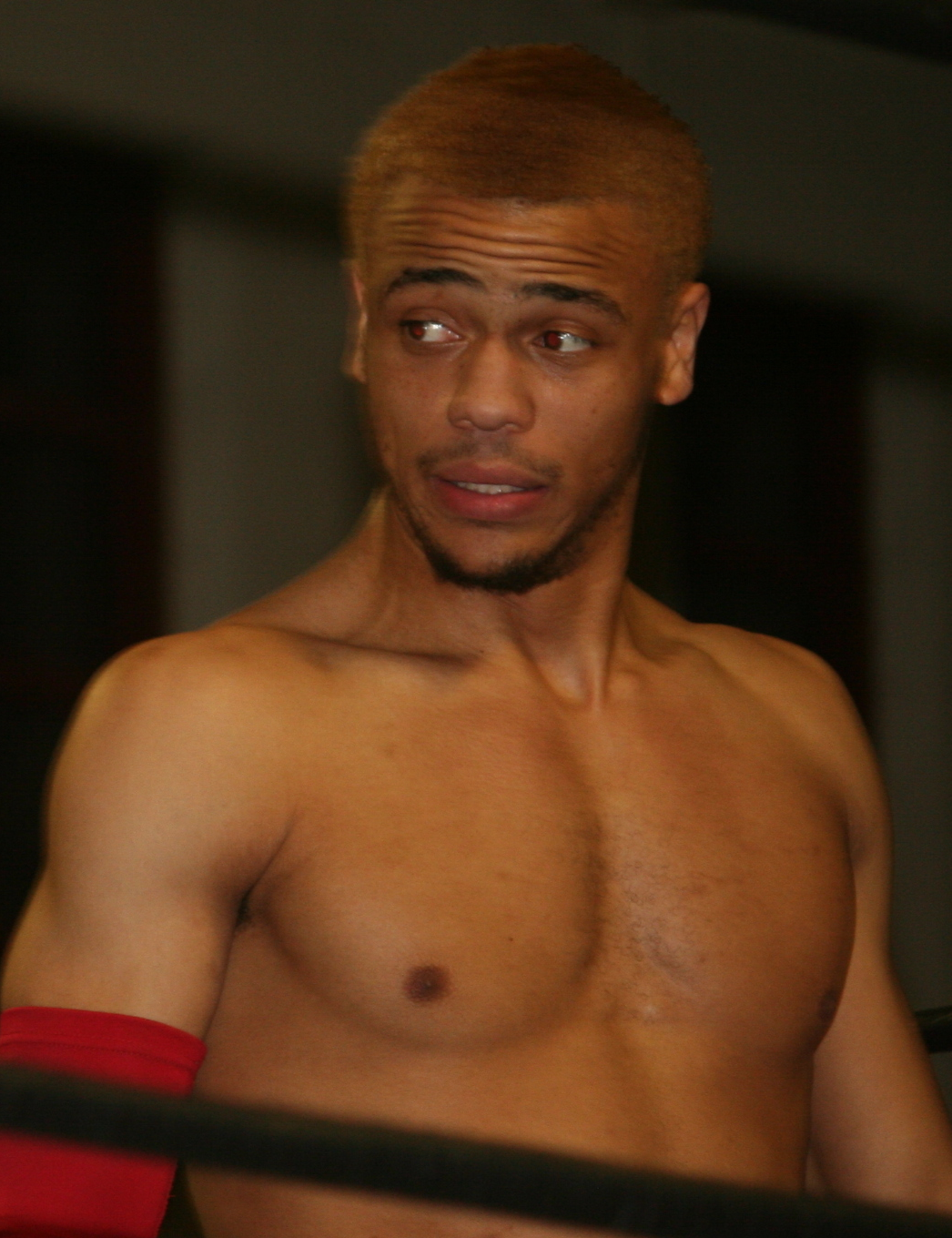
Reed in 2019

On the July 19, 2018 episode of Major League Wrestling's Fusion, Reed made his debut for the company in a losing effort to Kotto Brazil.

In a storyline started on the February 16, 2019 edition of MLW Fusion a group known as Injustice was formed. Originally a pairing of Reed and Rich Swann, the stable later added Jordan Oliver, Kotto Brazil & Saieve Al Sabah. However the group would split with Myron Reed being the only one still with the company as of 2022.

On the November 11, 2019 episode of Major League Wrestling's flagship show MLW Fusion, Reed defeated Teddy Hart to win the World Middleweight Championship after Contra Unit member Josef Samael threw a fireball into Hart's face. Reed successfully defended his title on four different occasions against El Lindaman, Drago, Laredo Kid and Brian Pillman Jr. at Fusion. On January 6, 2021, Lio Rush defeated Myron Reed to end his 424 days title reign at special episode of Fusion - Kings Of Colosseum 2021.

On the May 5, 2021 episode of Major League Wrestling's Fusion, Myron Reed defeated Lio Rush to win the World Middleweight Championship, making Reed the first two-time champion in company's history. However, on October 2, 2021, at MLW Fightland, Reed's title reign come to end against Yoshihiro Tajiri in a four-way match which also includes Aramis and Arez.

On the January 21, 2022 MLW Tapings, Reed would make history yet again, by defeating Yoshihiro Tajiri, Matt Cross, and Bandido in a four-way match to become a record three time MLW World Middleweight Champion.

On January 14, 2023, following the expiration of his MLW contract, Reed announced that he is a free agent.

=== Impact / Total Nonstop Action Wrestling (2023–2026) ===
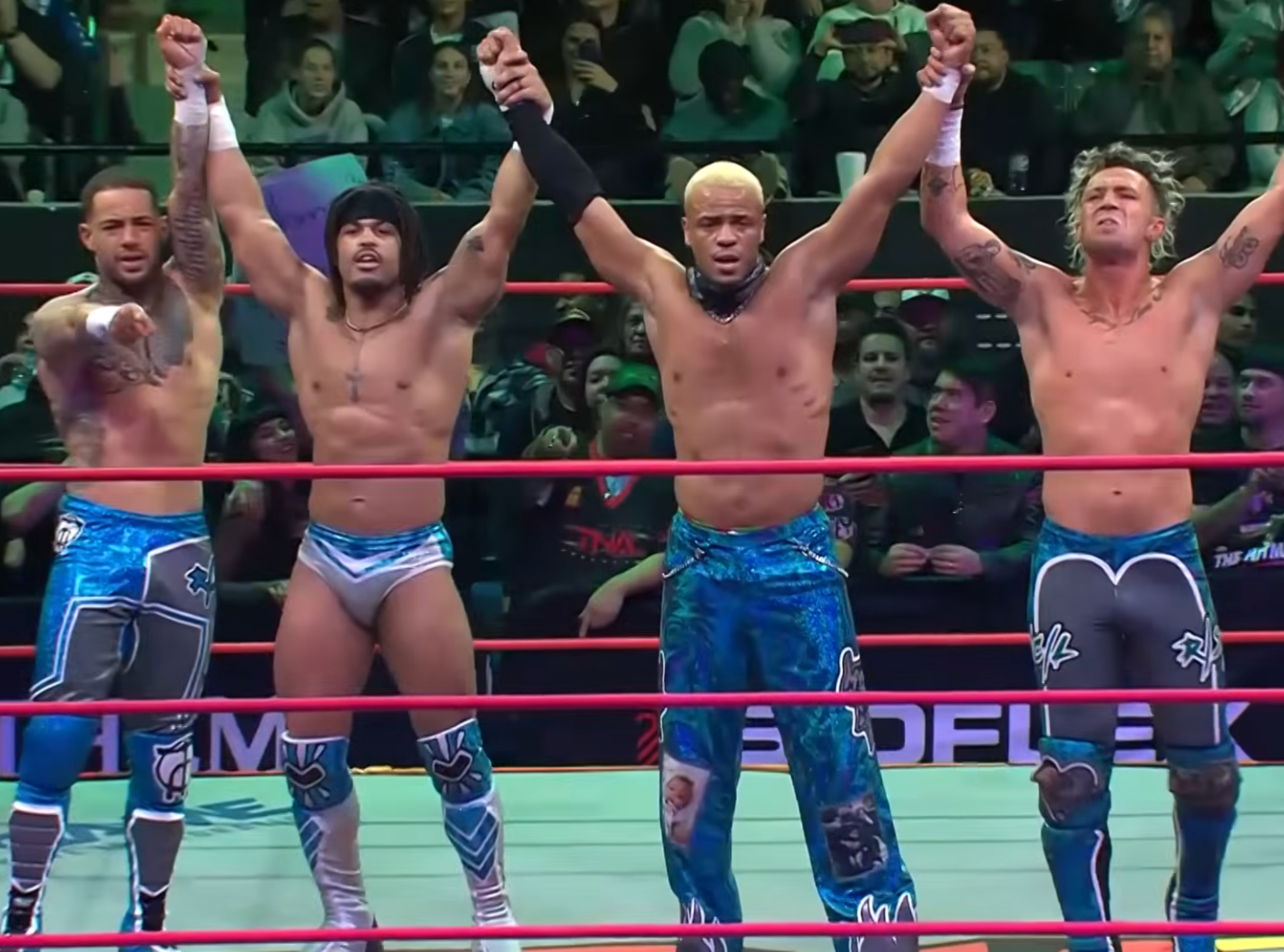
Reed (second from the right) and The Rascalz in 2025

On the November 9, 2023 episode of Impact!, Reed made his debut Impact Wrestling appearance by assisting Miguel and Wentz to regain the Impact World Tag Team Championship. Since then, Reed has also made sporadic appearances for the company. His final appearance was on the April 25, 2024 episode of Impact! where he lost to Mike Santana and was later quietly removed from the company's roster.

On the July 3, 2025 episode of Impact!, Reed accompanied Wentz (who replaced Miguel after he suffered a hernia injury) in Wentz's match against Nic Nemeth, reuniting with The Rascalz in the process. It was later reported that Reed is working for TNA as a free agent on a freelance basis. At Emergence on August 15, Reed challenged for the TNA World Tag Team Championship for the first time with Wentz but failed to defeat The Hardys (Matt Hardy and Jeff Hardy) for the titles. On the September 12 episode of Impact!, Wentz, Reed, Miguel (who returned from injury) and Jake Something faced each other in a four-way match, where Reed won to face Leon Slater for the TNA X Division Championship at Victory Road at September 26 but failed to win the title. At Turning Point on November 14, The Rascalz reunited with Dezmond Xavier to defeat The System (Brian Myers, Eddie Edwards, JDC, and Moose) in an eight-man tag team match.

Reed was originally scheduled to challenge Leon Slater for the TNA X Division Championship at Thursday Night Impact! premiere on AMC on January 15, 2026. However, the match was pulled from advertising after the contracts of all four members of The Rascalz expired and TNA elected not to opt-in, leaving The Rascalz as free agents. While Reed was willing to fulfil his remaining obligation with TNA, the match was still shelved due to Slater reportedly working in WWE's European tour.

=== All Elite Wrestling / Ring of Honor (2026–present) ===
In January 2026, it was reported by Fightful Select that Reed and the rest of The Rascalz (Dezmond Xavier, Trey Miguel, and Zachary Wentz) had signed with All Elite Wrestling (AEW). On January 14, 2026 at Dynamite: Maximum Carnage, AEW aired a video teasing The Rascalz's arrival. The Rascalz (barring Miguel, due to Miguel being released from AEW for past controversial remarks) made their on-screen debut on January 17 at Collision: Maximum Carnage in a backstage interview with Lexy Nair. On the February 11 episode of Dynamite, Reed made his in-ring debut, teaming with Xavier in a three-way tag team match for an AEW World Tag Team Championship match, which was won by The Young Bucks (Matt Jackson and Nick Jackson). Reed made his return for the now sister promotion of AEW Ring of Honor (ROH) on the March 26 episode of HonorClub, defeating Mansoor. Over the following months, Reed would challenge Kazuchika Okada for the AEW International Championship and Kevin Knight for the AEW TNT Championship.

== Music career ==
As Kid Reed, Myron has made music since 2021, available on iTunes. On February 13, 2024' Reed released a music video for his single "All Night". In June 2026, Reed (as Kid Reed) collaborated with Wigan grit-pop duo Dafties on the single “Lawnchair.exe”.

== Personal life ==
On September 2, 2024, Raquel Lourenço, who wrestles as Killer Kelly, announced she is expecting a child with Reed. They welcomed their first child a daughter named Ruby on November 6, 2024. In September 2025, Reed became engaged to Lourenço. Prior to his relationship with Lourenço, Reed has 2 children from a previous relationship.

== Championships and accomplishments ==
- AAW Wrestling
  - AAW Heritage Championship (1 time)
  - AAW Tag Team Championship (1 time) – with A. R. Fox
- Desastre Total Ultraviolento
  - DTU Nexo Championship (1 time) – with Mickey Midas
- Glory Pro Wrestling
  - Crown of Glory Championship (1 time)
  - United Glory Championship (1 time) – Stephen Wolf
- Independent Wrestling Association Mid-South
  - IWA Mid-South Tag Team Championship (2 times) – with Sugar Dunkerton (1) and Trey Miguel (1)
  - Candido Cup (2017) – with Sugar Dunkerton
- Independent Wrestling Expo
  - Flightweight Tournament (2021)
- Major League Wrestling
  - MLW World Middleweight Championship (3 times)
- Squared Circle Project
  - Squared Circle Project Heavyweight Championship (1 time)
- New South Championship Wrestling
  - NWA Southern Tag Team Championship (1 time) – with Mickey Muscles
- Paradigm Pro Wrestling
  - PPW Championship (1 time)
- Pro Wrestling Illustrated
  - Ranked No. 84 of the top 500 singles wrestlers in the PWI 500 in 2021
- Rockstar Pro Wrestling
  - Rockstar Pro Trios Championship (3 times) – with Clayton Jackson & Zachary Wentz (1), Alex Colon & Trey Miguel (1), and Dustin Rayz & Trey Miguel (1)
- Scenic City Invitational
  - Scenic City Trios Tournament (2017) – with Curt Stallion and Gary Jay
- Wild Championship Wrestling Outlaws
  - Young Guns Tournament (2017)
- The Wrestling Revolver
  - Revolver World Championship (1 time)
  - Revolver World Tag Team Championship (1 time) – with Trey Miguel and Zachary Wentz
