= 2023 WWE Draft =

Intra-brand draft

- Promotional poster featuring wrestlers from the Raw and SmackDown brands

General information
- Sport: Professional wrestling
- Date: April 28 – May 1, 2023
- Location: American Bank Center (April 28, 2023); Dickies Arena (May 1, 2023)

Overview
- League: WWE
- Teams: Raw; SmackDown; NXT (outgoing only)

The 2023 WWE Draft was the 17th WWE Draft produced by the American professional wrestling promotion WWE between their Raw and SmackDown brand divisions. The two-night event began with the April 28 episode of Friday Night SmackDown (in Corpus Christi, Texas) and concluded with the May 1 episode of Monday Night Raw (in Fort Worth, Texas), with SmackDown airing on Fox and Raw on the USA Network. This was the first draft held since 2021 and the first under the creative direction of Triple H. In addition, this was the last draft before the TKO Group Holdings acquisition. Draft results went into effect beginning with the May 8 episode of Raw.

== Production ==
=== Background ===
The WWE Draft is a process used by the American professional wrestling promotion WWE while a brand extension, or brand split, is in effect. The original brand extension occurred from 2002 to 2011, while the second and current brand split began in 2016. During a brand extension, the company divides its roster into what they call brands and wrestlers exclusively perform for each brand's respective television show, albeit with some exceptions. The draft is used to refresh the rosters of the brand divisions, typically between the Raw and SmackDown brands, which are regarded as the main roster. Since 2016, wrestlers from WWE's developmental brand, NXT, have been eligible to be drafted to either Raw or SmackDown.

A draft was not held in 2022 and brand division enforcement became increasingly laxed, but on the April 7, 2023, episode of SmackDown, WWE executive Triple H announced the 2023 draft and stated that every WWE wrestler from Raw and SmackDown would be eligible for the draft, as well as select wrestlers from NXT. The following week, the dates for WWE's 17th draft were confirmed, with it beginning with the April 28 episode of Friday Night SmackDown and concluding with the May 1 episode of Monday Night Raw, with SmackDown airing on Fox and Raw on the USA Network. This subsequently repositioned the draft back in its traditional post-WrestleMania slot, after the last three drafts were held in October. The drafting pools for which wrestlers were eligible to be drafted each night were revealed on April 27. On Night 1 of the draft, Triple H announced that draft results would go into effect beginning with the May 8 episode of Raw, two days after the Backlash pay-per-view and livestreaming event.

== Selections ==
=== Night 1: SmackDown (April 28) ===
There were four rounds of draft picks on Night 1 with each brand receiving two picks each round; SmackDown went first due to Night 1 taking place as that night's episode of SmackDown. Draft selections were announced by various WWE Hall of Famers, including Triple H, who announced the first-round picks. The second round picks were announced by Rob Van Dam and Michael Hayes, the third round by John "Bradshaw" Layfield and Teddy Long, and the fourth by D-Generation X (Shawn Michaels and "Road Dogg" Jesse James).

Round	Brand pick #	Overall pick #	Wrestler(s)	Pre-draft brand	Post-draft brand	Role
1	1	1	The Bloodline (Roman Reigns and Solo Sikoa with Paul Heyman)	SmackDown	SmackDown	Male tag team and male manager Undisputed WWE Universal Champion (Reigns)
1	1	2	Cody Rhodes	Raw	Raw	Male wrestler
1	2	3	Bianca Belair	Raw	SmackDown	Female wrestler Raw Women's Champion
1	2	4	Becky Lynch	Raw	Raw	Female wrestler
2	3	5	Street Profits (Angelo Dawkins and Montez Ford)	Raw	SmackDown	Male tag team
2	3	6	Imperium (Gunther, Ludwig Kaiser, and Giovanni Vinci)	SmackDown	Raw	Male stable Intercontinental Champion (Gunther)
2	4	7	Edge	Raw	SmackDown	Male wrestler WWE Hall of Famer
2	4	8	Matt Riddle	Raw	Raw	Male wrestler
3	5	9	Bobby Lashley	Raw	SmackDown	Male wrestler
3	5	10	Drew McIntyre	SmackDown	Raw	Male wrestler
3	6	11	The O.C. (AJ Styles, Luke Gallows, Karl Anderson, and "Michin" Mia Yim)	Raw	SmackDown	Mixed stable
3	6	12	The Miz	Raw	Raw	Male wrestler
4	7	13	Damage CTRL (Bayley, Dakota Kai, and Iyo Sky)	Raw	SmackDown	Female stable
4	7	14	Shinsuke Nakamura	SmackDown	Raw	Male wrestler
4	8	15	Alba Fyre and Isla Dawn	NXT	SmackDown	Female tag team NXT Women's Tag Team Champions
4	8	16	Indi Hartwell	NXT	Raw	Female wrestler NXT Women's Champion

==== Night 1 supplemental picks: SmackDown LowDown (April 29) ====
These wrestlers were included in the Night 1 draft pool, but were not drafted on SmackDown. Their draft selections were revealed on SmackDown's post-show, SmackDown LowDown, the next day on WWE's social media and streaming platforms.

Wrestler(s)	Pre-draft brand	Post-draft brand	Role
Apollo Crews	NXT	Raw	Male wrestler
Candice LeRae	Raw	Raw	Female wrestler
Chelsea Green and Sonya Deville	Raw (Green); SmackDown (Deville)	Raw	Female tag team
Dexter Lumis	Raw	Raw	Male wrestler
Hit Row (Ashante "Thee" Adonis, B-Fab, and Top Dolla)	SmackDown	SmackDown	Mixed stable
JD McDonagh	NXT	Raw	Male wrestler
Lacey Evans	SmackDown	SmackDown	Female wrestler
Maximum Male Models (ma.çé and mån.sôör with Maxxine Dupri)	Raw	Raw	Male tag team and female manager
Natalya	SmackDown	Raw	Female wrestler
The Viking Raiders (Erik and Ivar with Valhalla)	SmackDown	Raw	Male tag team and female manager
Zoey Stark	NXT	Raw	Female wrestler

=== Night 2: Raw (May 1) ===
There were six rounds of draft picks on Night 2 with each brand receiving two picks each round; Raw went first due to Night 2 taking place as that night's episode of Raw. Draft selections were again announced by various WWE Hall of Famers, including Triple H, who again announced the first round picks; several others from Night 1 returned to announce Night 2's selections. Booker T and his wife Queen Sharmell announced the round two picks, Shawn Michaels returned to announce the round three picks, round four were by Eric Bischoff and the returning Rob Van Dam, round five by Molly Holly and the returning "Road Dogg" Jesse James, and the sixth and final round were announced by the returning John "Bradshaw" Layfield and Teddy Long. WWE official Adam Pearce was supposed to announce the round three picks with Michaels but instead had to help break up a fight between Brock Lesnar and Cody Rhodes.

Round	Brand pick #	Overall pick #	Wrestler(s)	Pre-draft brand	Post-draft brand	Role
1	1	1	Rhea Ripley (Note: Although a member of The Judgment Day stable, Ripley was listed separately in the drafting pool, but The Judgment Day would stay together as they were all drafted to Raw.)	Raw	Raw	Female wrestler SmackDown Women's Champion
1	1	2	Austin Theory	Raw	SmackDown	Male wrestler United States Champion
1	2	3	Seth "Freakin" Rollins	Raw	Raw	Male wrestler
1	2	4	Charlotte Flair	SmackDown	SmackDown	Female wrestler
2	3	5	Kevin Owens and Sami Zayn	Raw (Owens); SmackDown (Zayn)	Raw	Male tag team Undisputed WWE Tag Team Champions (Note: The holders of the Undisputed WWE Tag Team Championship are allowed to appear on both brands for as long as they are champions.)
2	3	6	The Usos (Note: Although members of The Bloodline stable, The Usos were listed separately in the drafting pool, but The Bloodline would stay together as they were all drafted to SmackDown.) (Jey Uso and Jimmy Uso)	SmackDown	SmackDown	Male tag team
2	4	7	The Judgment Day (Finn Bálor, Damian Priest, and Dominik Mysterio)	Raw	Raw	Male stable
2	4	8	Latino World Order (Rey Mysterio, Santos Escobar, Cruz Del Toro, Joaquin Wilde, and Zelina Vega)	SmackDown	SmackDown	Mixed stable
3	5	9	Liv Morgan and Raquel Rodríguez	SmackDown	Raw	Female tag team WWE Women's Tag Team Champions (Note: The holders of the WWE Women's Tag Team Championship are allowed to appear on both brands for as long as they are champions.)
3	5	10	Asuka	Raw	SmackDown	Female wrestler
3	6	11	The New Day (Kofi Kingston and Xavier Woods)	SmackDown	Raw	Male tag team
3	6	12	The Brawling Brutes (Sheamus, Ridge Holland, and Butch)	SmackDown	SmackDown	Male stable
4	7	13	Trish Stratus	Raw	Raw	Female wrestler WWE Hall of Famer
4	7	14	Karrion Kross with Scarlett	SmackDown	SmackDown	Male wrestler and female manager
4	8	15	Ronda Rousey and Shayna Baszler	SmackDown	Raw	Female tag team
4	8	16	LA Knight	SmackDown	SmackDown	Male wrestler
5	9	17	Braun Strowman and Ricochet	SmackDown	Raw	Male tag team
5	9	18	Shotzi	SmackDown	SmackDown	Female wrestler
5	10	19	Bronson Reed	Raw	Raw	Male wrestler
5	10	20	Pretty Deadly (Elton Prince and Kit Wilson)	NXT	SmackDown	Male tag team
6	11	21	Alpha Academy (Chad Gable and Otis)	Raw	Raw	Male tag team
6	11	22	Rick Boogs	Raw	SmackDown	Male wrestler
6	12	23	Katana Chance and Kayden Carter	NXT	Raw	Female tag team
6	12	24	Cameron Grimes	NXT	SmackDown	Male wrestler

==== Night 2 supplemental picks: Raw Talk (May 1) ====
These wrestlers were included in the Night 2 draft pool, but were not drafted on Raw. Their draft selections were revealed on Raw's post-show, Raw Talk, which aired immediately after Raw on WWE's social media and streaming platforms.

Wrestler(s)	Pre-draft brand	Post-draft brand	Role
Akira Tozawa	Raw	Raw	Male wrestler
Dana Brooke	Raw	Raw	Female wrestler
Emma	SmackDown	Raw	Female wrestler
Grayson Waller	NXT	SmackDown	Male wrestler
Indus Sher (Jinder Mahal, Sanga, and Veer Mahaan)	NXT	Raw	Male stable
Johnny Gargano	Raw	Raw	Male wrestler
Los Lotharios (Angel and Humberto)	SmackDown	Raw	Male tag team
Nikki Cross	Raw	Raw	Female wrestler
Odyssey Jones	NXT	Raw	Male wrestler
Piper Niven	Raw	Raw	Female wrestler
Riddick Moss	SmackDown	Raw	Male wrestler
Tamina	Raw	SmackDown	Female wrestler
Tegan Nox	SmackDown	Raw	Female wrestler
Xia Li	SmackDown	Raw	Female wrestler

=== Free agents ===
Within WWE's storylines, a "free agent" refers to a contracted wrestler who has not been assigned to one of the company's three brands—Raw, SmackDown, or NXT—and can in turn appear on any brand. The following wrestlers were included in the draft pools but ultimately became free agents, either through contractual negotiations or going undrafted. Their status as free agents were announced via the post-shows, SmackDown LowDown and Raw Talk.

Wrestler(s)	Pre-draft brand	Date	Role	Notes
Baron Corbin	Raw	May 1, 2023	Male wrestler	Went undrafted during Night 2. Declared as a free agent during Night 2's supplemental draft, but would later be assigned to NXT in August.
Brock Lesnar	Free agent (Note: During the 2021 draft, Lesnar was made a free agent, allowing him to appear on either brand, although he had primarily appeared on Raw since October 2022.)	May 1, 2023	Male wrestler	During Night 2 of the draft, Triple H announced that Lesnar, who was initially included in the Night 2 draft pool, renegotiated his free agent status so that he could continue to appear for both brands.
Cedric Alexander and Shelton Benjamin	Raw	May 1, 2023	Male tag team	Went undrafted during Night 2. Declared as free agents during Night 2's supplemental draft. Benjamin, however, was released from his WWE contract on September 21, 2023. After several months as a free agent, Alexander was assigned to SmackDown in November 2023.
Dolph Ziggler	Raw	April 29, 2023	Male wrestler	Went undrafted during Night 1. Declared as a free agent during Night 1's supplemental draft; however, he was released from his WWE contract on September 21, 2023. Now wrestles in Total Nonstop Action Wrestling (TNA) and New Japan Pro Wrestling (NJPW) as Nic Nemeth.
Elias	Raw	May 1, 2023	Male wrestler	Went undrafted during Night 2. Declared as a free agent during Night 2's supplemental draft; however, he was released from his WWE contract on September 21, 2023. Now wrestles in Total Nonstop Action Wrestling (TNA) as Elijah.
Mustafa Ali	Raw	April 29, 2023	Male wrestler	Went undrafted during Night 1. Declared as a free agent during Night 1's supplemental draft. He was later assigned to NXT in August, but was released from his WWE contract on September 21, 2023. Now wrestles in Total Nonstop Action Wrestling (TNA) and New Japan Pro Wrestling (NJPW).
Omos with MVP	Raw	April 29, 2023	Male wrestler and male manager	During Night 1's supplemental draft, it was revealed that MVP negotiated their free agent status to maximize Omos' visibility on both brands.
Von Wagner	NXT	April 29, 2023	Male wrestler	Though not initially included in the Night 1 draft pool, Wagner was revealed as one of the select NXT wrestlers available to be drafted on SmackDown LowDown. He was declared as a free agent during Night 1's supplemental draft. However Wagner still remains in NXT. Wagner was released from his WWE contract on April 19, 2024.
Xyon Quinn	NXT	May 1, 2023	Male wrestler	Though not initially included in the Night 2 draft pool, Quinn was revealed as one of the select NXT wrestlers available to be drafted on Raw Talk. He was declared as a free agent during Night 2's supplemental draft. Quinn was released from his WWE contract on April 19, 2024.

=== Wrestlers not included in either draft pool ===
The following are wrestlers who were not included in either draft pool, as they had been inactive for extended periods leading up to the draft (largely due to injury).

Wrestler(s)	Pre-draft brand	Reason for omission (if any)	Subsequent status	Date	Role	Notes
Logan Paul	Free agent	Part-time contract	Free agent	April 29, 2023	Male wrestler	Paul makes limited appearances per year. His last appearance before the draft was at WrestleMania 39 Night 1 on April 1, 2023. On April 29, Fightful confirmed that Paul would continue as a free agent.
Tommaso Ciampa	Raw	Inactive due to a hip injury	Raw	June 19, 2023	Male wrestler	Last appeared on the September 19, 2022, episode of Raw. Returned on the June 19, 2023, episode in a match against The Miz.
Gable Steveson	Raw	Inactive due to training for the 2024 Olympics	NXT	July 25, 2023	Male wrestler	Steveson was drafted to Raw in the 2021 draft, but was still training at the WWE Performance Center. In addition to training, he had made a couple of appearances on WWE TV programs, with his last appearance before the draft occurring on the December 9, 2022, episode of SmackDown for Kurt Angle's birthday celebration. He then returned on the June 20, 2023, episode of NXT and began making occasional appearances before deciding he would join NXT on the July 25 episode.
Robert Roode	Raw	Inactive due to neck surgery	Producer	August 5, 2023	Male wrestler	Last appeared on the June 6, 2022, episode of Raw. In August 2023, he began working behind the scenes as a producer with his first official show being that year's SummerSlam.
Bray Wyatt	SmackDown	Was inactive due to contracting COVID-19, which exacerbated an existing heart issue	Deceased	August 24, 2023	Male wrestler	Last appeared on the February 24, 2023, episode of SmackDown. On August 24, 2023, Wyatt unexpectedly died from a heart attack.
Aliyah	SmackDown	Inactive for unknown reasons	Released	September 21, 2023	Female wrestler	Last appeared on the September 12, 2022, episode of Raw. Released from her WWE contract on September 21, 2023.
Shanky	SmackDown	Inactive for unknown reasons	Released	September 21, 2023	Male wrestler	Last appeared on the July 22, 2022, episode of SmackDown. Returned at the Superstar Spectacle event in India on September 8, 2023, but no brand designation was assigned; however, he was released from his WWE contract on September 21, 2023.
Randy Orton	Raw	Inactive due to a back injury	SmackDown	November 25, 2023	Male wrestler	Last appeared on the May 20, 2022, episode of SmackDown. Returned at Survivor Series: WarGames on November 25, 2023, as part of Cody Rhodes' team in the men's WarGames match, but no brand designation was assigned. On the December 1 episode of SmackDown, he was revealed as a free agent prior to a contract signing that happened that night, where he signed with SmackDown.
R-Truth	Raw	Inactive due to a torn quadricep	Raw	November 27, 2023	Male wrestler	Last appeared on the November 1, 2022, episode of NXT. Returned at Survivor Series: WarGames on November 25, 2023, during a cross-branded backstage segment but no brand designation was assigned.
Big E	SmackDown	Inactive due to a neck injury	Commentator	April 6, 2024	Male wrestler	Last appeared on the March 11, 2022, episode of SmackDown. Beginning at WrestleMania XL, Big E began making regular appearances as a pre- and post-show panelist for PLEs.
Bo Dallas/Uncle Howdy	SmackDown	Was originally inactive due to Bray Wyatt's absence, but took extended time off following Wyatt's death.	Raw	June 17, 2024	Male wrestler	Last appeared on the March 3, 2023, episode of SmackDown. Returned on the June 17, 2024, episode of Raw, now portraying both Howdy and his original persona of Bo Dallas.
Alexa Bliss	Raw	Inactive due to skin cancer treatment and maternity leave	SmackDown	February 1, 2025	Female wrestler	Last appeared at the Royal Rumble on January 28, 2023. Returned at the Royal Rumble on February 1, 2025, and was subsequently assigned to SmackDown on February 7.
Carmella	Raw	Inactive due to maternity leave	Released	February 21, 2025	Female wrestler	Last appeared on March 31, 2023, for the WrestleMania 39 set reveal. Her WWE contract expired in February 2025 and was not renewed.

== Aftermath ==
=== Post-draft moves ===
The day after the draft on May 2, it was revealed that ring announcers Mike Rome and Samantha Irvin, who announced for Raw and SmackDown, respectively, would switch brands beginning May 8.

Despite being drafted to Raw, Dana Brooke appeared on the June 6 episode of NXT to compete in a battle royal to determine the next challenger for the NXT Women's Championship. During her entrance, she was referred to as a Raw roster member, but during the battle royal itself, the commentators referred to her as a free agent. An official change to her status was not announced and her WWE.com profile still listed her as a member of Raw. Furthermore, although Los Lotharios (Angel and Humberto) were drafted to Raw, they would also appear in NXT on the June 13 episode, stating they would be going after the NXT Tag Team Championship (their individual ring names would also revert to Angel Garza and Humberto Carrillo, respectively, in July), they later returned to the main roster on the December 22 episode of SmackDown. Other main roster wrestlers would appear in NXT, and hold championships, with WWE president Nick Khan stating this cross-over of talent from Raw and SmackDown to NXT was intentional, as he said there was potential for NXT to become WWE's third brand again while still developing younger wrestlers.

On August 5, WWE announced a change to the on-air commentary teams that would begin with the August 7 episode of Raw. Raw's team of Corey Graves and Kevin Patrick moved to SmackDown while SmackDown commentator Wade Barrett moved to Raw, with Michael Cole, who was on SmackDown with Barrett, doing commentary for both shows.

At Payback on September 2, 2023, Jey Uso, who had "quit" WWE a month prior after a fallout with his brother Jimmy Uso and The Bloodline as a whole, was reinstated but as a member of Raw. On the following episode of Raw, WWE official Adam Pearce revealed that a member of the Raw roster was traded to SmackDown so that Jey could join Raw. The following month on the October 13 episode of SmackDown, after Triple H announced that Pearce—who had officiated for both Raw and SmackDown since January 2020—would now just be the general manager of Raw with former National Wrestling Alliance wrestler Nick Aldis introduced as SmackDown's general manager, Aldis revealed that Kevin Owens had been traded to SmackDown for Jey, in turn splitting the team of Owens and Sami Zayn.

Shortly after the draft, NXT's Dragon Lee began making appearances on the main roster and had his main roster debut match on SmackDown in October. He was subsequently promoted to the main roster on the SmackDown brand. After a successful in-ring debut on Raw the week prior, NXT's Diamond Mine (Brutus Creed, Julius Creed, and Ivy Nile) were promoted to the main roster on the Raw brand on November 6, 2023.

At SmackDown: New Year's Revolution, NXT's Tyler Bate made his main roster debut. Afterwards, Bate confirmed via WWE's Instagram page that he was now an official member of the SmackDown roster. NXT's Elektra Lopez were promoted to the main roster on the SmackDown brand on January 26, 2024. Following Royal Rumble appearances, NXT's Tiffany Stratton and Bron Breakker were subsequently promoted to the main roster on the SmackDown brand. During this time, the SmackDown stable The Brawling Brutes was disbanded as Ridge Holland later moved back to the NXT brand, while Butch would return to using his original ring name Pete Dunne and started a tag team with Bate under the name New Catch Republic.

=== Championships ===
Prior to the draft on the April 24 episode of Raw, Triple H unveiled a new World Heavyweight Championship for the brand that did not select Undisputed WWE Universal Champion Roman Reigns, as he and his titles would become exclusive to the brand that drafted him. As a result of SmackDown drafting Reigns, the World Heavyweight Championship became exclusive to Raw. Despite the title becoming exclusive to Raw, SmackDown wrestlers competed in the tournament to crown the inaugural champion (which was reportedly due to WWE's attempt to retain viewership for the May 12 episode of SmackDown, which went head-to-head with the 2023 NBA playoffs). At Night of Champions, Raw's Seth "Freakin" Rollins defeated SmackDown's AJ Styles to become the inaugural World Heavyweight Champion.

On Night 1 of the draft, reigning NXT Women's Tag Team Champions Isla Dawn and Alba Fyre were drafted to SmackDown. That same night, they were scheduled to defend the championship against Kayden Carter and Katana Chance on the May 2 episode of NXT, but during Night 2 of the draft, Carter and Chance were drafted to Raw. On NXT, Dawn and Fyre retained the title and they claimed they would defend the NXT Women's Tag Team Championship across all three brands. On that same episode, reigning NXT Women's Champion Indi Hartwell relinquished her title due to being drafted to Raw and also due to a leg injury. On the June 9 episode of SmackDown, the issue of the NXT Women's Tag Team Championship being on SmackDown would be addressed as reigning WWE Women's Tag Team Champions Ronda Rousey and Shayna Baszler challenged Dawn and Fyre to a championship unification match, which was accepted and scheduled for the June 23 episode. Rousey and Baszler won to become the unified WWE Women's Tag Team Champions, thus making the WWE Women's Tag Team Championship available to NXT again. The NXT Women's Tag Team Championship was subsequently retired in the process, with Dawn and Fyre recognized as the final champions.

As a result of the draft, Raw and SmackDown's secondary championships switched brands, as Intercontinental Champion Gunther was drafted to Raw while United States Champion Austin Theory was drafted to SmackDown, and there were no title changes by the time draft results went into effect on May 8. Despite their namesakes, the women's championships would also switch brands, with Raw Women's Champion Bianca Belair drafted to SmackDown and SmackDown Women's Champion Rhea Ripley drafted to Raw. This same incident occurred during the 2021 draft, but the night that draft's results went into effect, the women's champions swapped titles to keep the branded championships on their respective brands. This did not happen between Belair and Ripley when the 2023 draft results went into effect on May 8. The issue of the Raw and SmackDown women's championships being on the opposite brands would be resolved a month after the draft following the Night of Champions event. On the June 9 episode of SmackDown, reigning Raw Women's Champion Asuka was presented with a new championship belt and the title reverted to its original name of WWE Women's Championship, while on the June 12 episode of Raw, reigning SmackDown Women's Champion Rhea Ripley was also presented with a new championship belt and the title was renamed as the Women's World Championship.

=== Other post-draft changes ===
Although Maxxine Dupri was drafted to Raw as the manager of Maximum Male Models (ma.çé and mån.sôör), she would leave the team and join with Alpha Academy (Chad Gable and Otis), who were also drafted to Raw. The two teams had been at odds before the draft where Dupri tried to get Otis to join Maximum Male Models.

In August 2023, Lacey Evans left WWE due to the expiration of her contract. Edge would also leave WWE upon the expiration of his contract at the end of September and subsequently joined rival promotion All Elite Wrestling under his real name of Adam Copeland. During the summer, Shayna Baszler turned on Ronda Rousey, splitting their team, and after Rousey lost a match to Baszler at SummerSlam in August, it was reported that Rousey had left WWE, which was later confirmed in late October when her WWE.com profile was moved to the alumni section. She subsequently had a few matches on the indies, including a match in Ring of Honor.

Bray Wyatt was not included in either draft pool and had been off WWE programming since February 2023 due to an undisclosed illness. On August 24, 2023, Wyatt unexpectedly died of a heart attack, with the illness revealed as COVID-19 which exacerbated an existing heart issue. Just prior to his passing, it was reported that he was making positive progress towards a return. His accomplice Uncle Howdy had been inactive due to Wyatt's medical hiatus, but following Wyatt's death, Howdy's status was unknown.

Following WWE's acquisition by Endeavor, which was finalized on September 12 and saw WWE merge with Ultimate Fighting Championship to become divisions of a new company called TKO Group Holdings, WWE announced a new broadcasting deal that would move SmackDown back to the USA Network in October 2024. As a result of the merger and broadcasting deal, WWE released a number of wrestlers from all three brands, including some WWE Performance Center recruits, in late September. These included Dolph Ziggler, Shelton Benjamin, Elias, Mustafa Ali, Emma, Riddick Moss, Aliyah, Top Dolla, Rick Boogs, Dabba-Kato, Shanky, Maximum Male Models (ma.çé and mån.sôör), Quincy Elliot, Dana Brooke, Yulisa León, Ikemen Jiro, Matt Riddle, Bryson Montana, Daniel McArthur, Kevin Ventura-Cortez, Alexis Gray, Brooklyn Barlow, Abule Abadi-Fitzgerald, Melanie Brzezinski, Alexis Lete, Alivia Ash, Gina Delucia, Giovanna Eburneo and Sarah Baer. In April 2024, WWE released a number of wrestlers from all three brands, including Xia Li, Jinder Mahal, Veer Mahaan, Sanga, Xyon Quinn, Von Wagner, Cameron Grimes and Guru Raaj from their contracts.
