= A. J. Francis =

American football player & wrestler (born 1990)

A.J. Francis
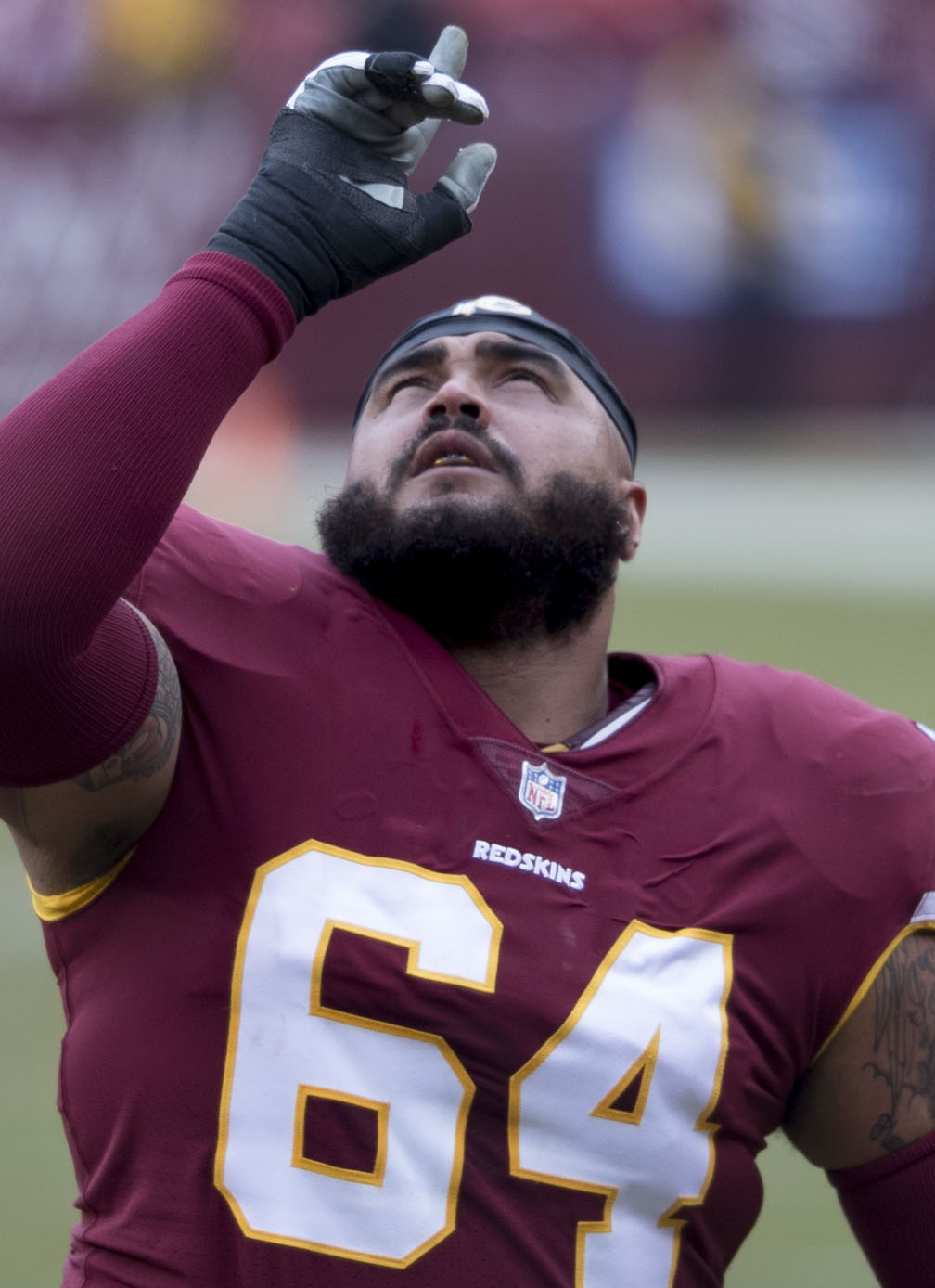
- Francis with the Washington Redskins in 2017
- Born: Anthony Joseph Francis; May 7, 1990 (age 36); Washington, D.C., U.S.
- Education: University of Maryland
- Professional wrestling career
- Ring name(s): A. J. Francis; AJ Francis; Suga Bear; Top Dolla; Dolla
- Billed height: 6 ft 5 in (1.96 m)
- Billed weight: 330 lb (150 kg)
- Trained by: Bubba Ray Dudley; D-Von Dudley
- Debut: October 25, 2018
- Football career

No. 96, 99, 64
- Position: Nose tackle

Personal information
- Listed height: 6 ft 5 in (1.96 m)
- Listed weight: 337 lb (153 kg)

Career information
- High school: Gonzaga College (Washington, D.C.)
- College: Maryland
- NFL draft: 2013: undrafted

Career history
- Miami Dolphins (2013)*; New England Patriots (2013)*; Miami Dolphins (2013–2015); Seattle Seahawks (2015); Tampa Bay Buccaneers (2016)*; Washington Redskins (2016–2017); New York Giants (2018)*
- * Offseason or practice squad member only

Career NFL statistics
- Total tackles: 20
- Stats at Pro Football Reference
- Website: ajfrancis.me

Anthony Joseph Francis (born May 7, 1990) is an American professional wrestler, rapper, and former football player. He is signed to Total Nonstop Action Wrestling (TNA), where he is the reigning TNA International Champion in his first reign. He is also a former one-time TNA Digital Media Champion and Canadian International Heavyweight Champion. He also performs on the independent circuit, predominantly for Reality of Wrestling (ROW), where he is a former two-time and inaugural ROW Glory Champion. He is also the leader of House Money (Quentin Wynters and Tiana Sway). He is best known for his previous tenures in WWE, where he performed under the ring name Top Dolla and was a member of Hit Row from 2020 to 2023.

Francis played college football for the Maryland Terrapins. He was signed by the Miami Dolphins of the National Football League (NFL) as an undrafted free agent in 2013 and also played for the Seattle Seahawks and Washington Redskins.

== Professional football career ==
Pre-draft measurables
Height	Weight	Arm length	Hand span	40-yard dash	10-yard split	20-yard split	20-yard shuttle	Three-cone drill	Vertical jump	Broad jump	Bench press
6 ft 5 in (1.96 m)	309 lb (140 kg)	33 1/2 in (0.85 m)	9 5/8 in (0.24 m)	4.98 s	1.78 s	3.04 s	4.58 s	7.45 s	29.0 in (0.74 m)	9 ft 4 in (2.84 m)	24 reps
All values from Pro Day

=== Miami Dolphins (first stint) ===
After going un-drafted in the 2013 NFL draft, Francis signed with the Miami Dolphins on April 30, 2013.

=== New England Patriots ===
The New England Patriots claimed Francis off waivers on September 1, 2013. He was released on September 7, only to be signed to the team's practice squad three days later. Francis remained on the practice squad until being re-signed by the Dolphins in November.

=== Miami Dolphins (second stint) ===
On November 27, 2013, Francis was signed off the Patriots' practice squad.

Francis was put on injured reserve on August 27, 2014. On November 14, 2015, he was waived.

=== Seattle Seahawks ===
On November 16, 2015, Francis was acquired off waivers by the Seattle Seahawks. On November 24, he was released by the team, but signed to the practice squad two days later. On November 30, 2015, he chose to be promoted to the active roster in Seattle rather than re-signing with the Dolphins to their active roster. On March 8, 2016, Francis signed his one-year exclusive-rights tender deal to return to Seattle. He was waived on May 9, 2016.

=== Tampa Bay Buccaneers ===
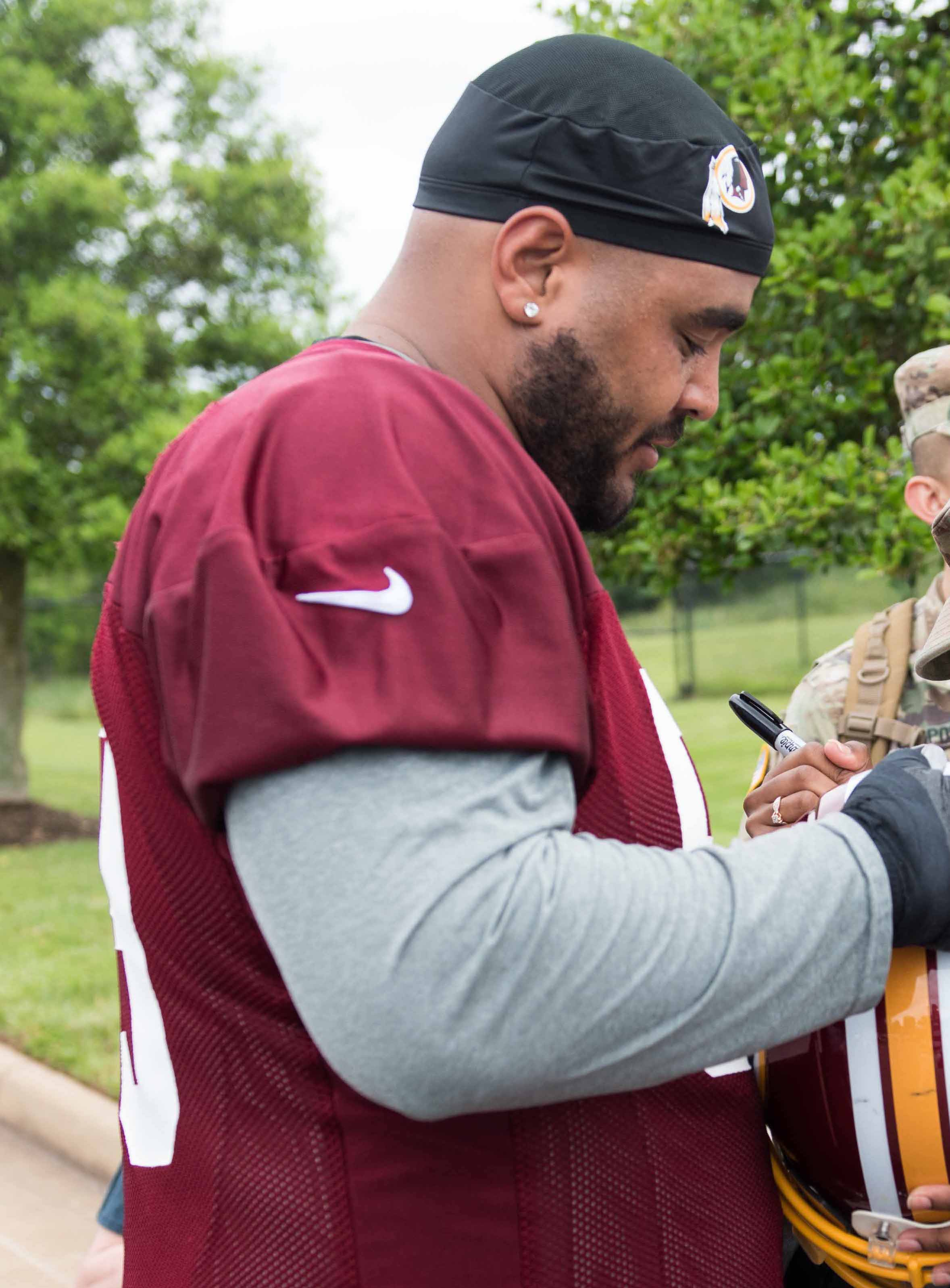
Francis signing autographs at 2017 training camp

On May 17, 2016, Francis signed with the Tampa Bay Buccaneers. He was waived on September 3, 2016.

=== Washington Redskins ===
On October 12, 2016, Francis signed with the Washington Redskins. He was promoted to the active roster on November 29, 2016. He was waived on December 10, 2016, and was re-signed back to the practice squad. Francis signed a futures contract on January 2, 2017.

On September 2, 2017, Francis was waived. He was re-signed to their practice squad on October 18, 2017, and was promoted to the active roster the next day. He was waived on October 25, 2017. He was re-signed on November 21, 2017.

Francis was waived on April 30, 2018. After his release, Francis publicly stated he was grateful that he was no longer a part of team due to the organization's lack of appreciation for him and adding his view that the team's mascot was racist.

=== New York Giants ===
On May 2, 2018, Francis signed with the New York Giants. He was released on September 1, 2018.

== Professional wrestling career ==
=== WWE (2020–2021) ===
Francis signed with WWE in January 2020. Francis, now assigned to the NXT brand, made his wrestling television debut on the May 4, 2021, episode of NXT where he aligned himself with Isaiah "Swerve" Scott by helping him defeat Leon Ruff in a Falls Count Anywhere match, establishing himself as a heel in the process. The following week, Francis was introduced as Top Dolla and formed a new stable, Hit Row with Scott, Ashante "Thee" Adonis, and B-Fab. Despite Top Dolla being drafted to SmackDown along with the rest of Hit Row as a part of the 2021 WWE Draft, B-Fab was released on November 4, and the rest of Hit Row were released fifteen days later as part of a round of mass layoffs due to budget cuts in response to the COVID-19 pandemic.

=== Independent circuit (2022) ===
Following his release from WWE, it was announced that Francis and the rest of Hit Row, minus Scott, would begin wrestling on the independent circuit, under the team name, The HitMakerZ. They would reunite at MCW’s Spring Break event, where Francis and Miles defeated Boom Hayden and Clay Jacobs. At Game Changer Wrestling’s For The Culture event, Francis and Miles would lose to the team of Shane Taylor and O’Shay Edwards.

=== Return to WWE (2022–2023) ===
After owner Vince McMahon stepped down in July 2022, Francis, reprising his "Top Dolla" character, made his unannounced return to WWE on the August 12, 2022, episode of SmackDown as a face, where he and Ashante "Thee" Adonis (accompanied by B-Fab), defeated two local competitors, thus reuniting Hit Row. On the December 16 episode of SmackDown, Top Dolla and Adonis won their first main roster championship opportunity for the Undisputed WWE Tag Team Championship by defeating The Viking Raiders and Legado Del Fantasma in a triple threat tag team match but failed to defeat The Usos for the championship. On the January 6, 2023 episode of SmackDown, Top Dolla was defeated by Ricochet in a Royal Rumble qualifying match. After the match, Top Dolla and the rest of Hit Row attacked Ricochet, turning heel in the process. Hit Row were drafted to the SmackDown brand in the 2023 WWE Draft. On September 21, nine days after WWE's merger with the Ultimate Fighting Championship (UFC) to form TKO Group Holdings, Top Dolla was once again released from his WWE contract along with a host of other WWE superstars, which effectively marked Hit Row's disbandment.

==== Second one-off return (2025) ====
On the June 3, 2025 episode of NXT, Francis made a one-off return to WWE under his real name, where he and KC Navarro assisted Trick Williams in retaining his TNA World Championship against Mike Santana.

=== Return to the independent circuit (2023–present) ===
In December 2023, Game Changer Wrestling (GCW) announced Francis' return to the promotion at Look At Me on January 26, 2024. At the GCW Holiday Special, Francis would attack Joey Janela. This would lead to a match between the two at Look At Me, which Janela won.

On January 11, 2025, Francis would make an appearance at Reality of Wrestling's Battle of the Belts, where he would compete in the Street Justice Rules Gauntlet, in a losing effort.

=== Total Nonstop Action Wrestling (2024–present) ===
On January 13, 2024, Francis made his debut for Total Nonstop Action Wrestling (TNA) at Hard To Kill under his real name, where he and DJ Whoo Kid promoted the music video of Francis' song "We Outside" (which would become his entrance theme) while quickly turning on the fans in attendance, thus establishing himself as a heel. Joe Hendry would later come out and interrupt Francis and Whoo Kid, and subsequently mocked Francis with a song, prompting Francis and Whoo Kid to attack Hendry, thus starting a feud between Francis and Hendry. On March 14 episode of TNA Impact!, he would defeat Hendry with the help of Rich Swann, with the duo now called First Class (stylized as Fir$t Cla$$), and ending the feud. On the June 6 episode of Impact! 20th Anniversary Show, Francis won the TNA Digital Media Championship from Laredo Kid, his first title win in TNA.

On the June 15 taping of TNA Impact! (aired on tape delay on June 27), Francis (in kayfabe) bought the Canadian International Heavyweight Championship, a title that was promoted in Canada for many years and had been retired since 1987. As the new owner of the title, Francis declared himself as its new champion, making himself a double champion in the process. At Slammiversary on July 20, Francis lost the TNA Digital Media Championship and the International Heavyweight Wrestling Championship to PCO in a Montreal Street Fight, ending his reign as TNA Digital Media Champion at 62 days and his reign as Canadian International Heavyweight Champion at 35 days. In August, KC Navarro would align himself with Francis and join Fir$t Cla$$, replacing Swann who had been suspended by the company due to disorderly intoxication. They would challenge ABC (Ace Austin and Chris Bey) for the TNA World Tag Team Championship at Emergence in a losing effort. On December 13 at Final Resolution, Francis fought Nic Nemeth for the TNA World Championship in a losing effort.

On the July 25, 2025 tapings of iMPACT!, Francis turned on Navarro and kicked him out of Fir$t Cla$$, with the latter being replaced by a returning Rich Swann. Francis and Swann teamed together as a tag team in TNA for the first time since August 2, 2024 as they defeated The System (Eddie Edwards and Brian Myers) at Emergence on August 14, 2025 in Swann's hometown of Baltimore, Maryland. At Final Resolution on December 5, 2025, Swann turned on Francis and aided Leon Slater in retaining the TNA X Division Championship, thus disbanding Fir$t Cla$$.

=== Major League Wrestling (2024) ===
On February 17, 2024 at Burning Crush, Francis made his debut for Major League Wrestling (MLW) debut in a pre-taped vignette, calling out Alex Kane and was revealed as the newest member of the World Titan Federation. On night 2 of Intimidation Games, Francis made his MLW in-ring debut, defeating Mr. Thomas.

=== National Wrestling Alliance (2024) ===
On March 2, 2024, Francis made his debut for the National Wrestling Alliance (NWA) at Hard Times, defeating Bryan Idol in a no disqualification match.

== Music career ==
On October 13, 2017, Francis released a music video on his YouTube channel by the name of Olympic Gold featuring an artist by the name of J-Lew, which would be featured on Francis' debut album "O.T.A" that has made it on ITunes / Apple Music. On March 15, 2022, A.J. Francis was featuring in a music video by the name of Digits alongside music group Swerve City which has former Hit Row member Isaiah "Swerve" Scott in it.

On March 6, 2023, Hit Row was partially reunited as a musical group when Francis (aka FRAN¢ / aka Top Dolla), Rich Latta, Swerve Strickland (aka Swerve The Realest / aka Isaiah "Swerve" Scott former member) & Briana Brandy (aka B-Fab) was featured in Monteasy's song "Price Went Up".

On July 21, 2023, Francis, under his Top Dolla ring name, alongside three members of Hit Row B-Fab and Ashante "Thee" Adonis released a freestyle single by the name of Barbie Barz.

== Other media ==
Other digital appearances

- In April 2021, Francis began hosting the A&E series WWE's Most Wanted Treasures in which he travels with WWE Legends as they search for memorabilia owned by private collectors, museums and occasionally other WWE Legends.

Video games

- Francis, as Top Dolla, alongside Hit Row members Ashante "Thee" Adonis & B-Fab (as a Manager; and probably Non-Playable), made their video game debut in WWE 2K23 as DLC characters in the Steiner Row Pack DLC bundle.

== Personal life ==
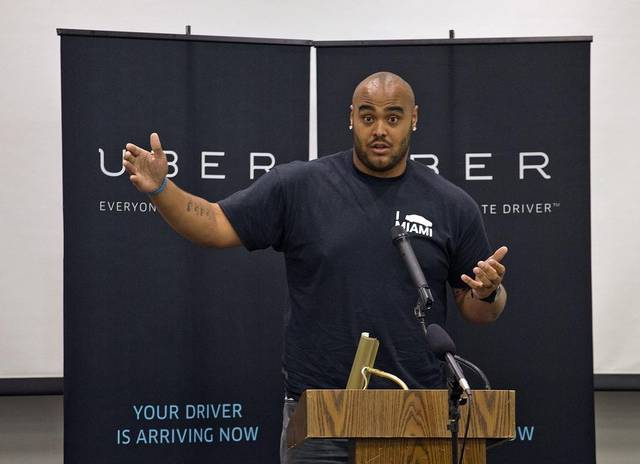
Francis speaking at an Uber event in 2015

In April 2015, Francis went viral for signing up to be an Uber driver in the off-season, while playing for the Miami Dolphins.

Francis revealed that he was diagnosed with type 2 diabetes in December 2022, with his blood sugar level at 626 mg/dL. He revealed his condition a year after being diagnosed with the disease, stating that his "legs felt off" before performing a botched suicide dive during a match on the December 16, 2022 episode of SmackDown.

== Championships and accomplishments ==
- 2econd Wrestling
  - Maxwell Street Heritage Championship (1 time)
- All Caribbean Wrestling
  - ACW Championship (1 time)
- America's Most Liked Wrestling
  - AML Tag Team Championship (1 time, current) – with Money ENT
- Cheez-It Citrus Bowl
  - Cheez-It Championship (2 time, current)
- The Establishment Wrestling
  - 24 Karat Battle Royal (2024)
- Pro Wrestling Illustrated
  - Ranked No. 200 of the top singles wrestlers in the PWI 500 in 2026
- Reality of Wrestling
  - ROW Television Championship (1 time, final)
  - ROW Glory Championship (2 times, inaugural)
  - Battle to the Bell (2026)
- Total Nonstop Action Wrestling
  - TNA International Championship (1 time, current)
  - TNA Digital Media Championship (1 time)
  - Canadian International Heavyweight Championship (1 time)
- The Wrestling Revolver
  - Revolver Remix Championship (1 time)

== See also ==
- List of gridiron football players who became professional wrestlers
