= 2021 WWE Draft =

Intra-brand draft

- Promotional poster featuring King Nakamura, Charlotte Flair, Damian Priest, Becky Lynch, Roman Reigns, and Bobby Lashley

General information
- Sport: Professional wrestling
- Date: October 1–4, 2021
- Location: Royal Farms Arena (Oct. 1); Bridgestone Arena (Oct. 4)

Overview
- League: WWE
- Teams: Raw; SmackDown; NXT (outgoing only)

The 2021 WWE Draft was the 16th WWE Draft produced by the American professional wrestling promotion WWE between their Raw and SmackDown brand divisions. The two-night event began with the October 1 episode of Friday Night SmackDown (in Baltimore, Maryland). It concluded with the October 4 episode of Monday Night Raw (in Nashville, Tennessee), with SmackDown airing on Fox and Raw on the USA Network. Unlike previous drafts, in which results took effect immediately, the results of the 2021 draft went into effect in the October 22 episode of SmackDown. This was also the last draft with Vince McMahon as head of WWE creative.

== Production ==
=== Background ===
The WWE Draft is an annual process used by the American professional wrestling promotion WWE while a brand extension, or brand split, is in effect. The original brand extension occurred from 2002 to 2011, while the second and current brand split began in 2016. During a brand extension, the company divides its roster into brands where the wrestlers exclusively perform for each brand's respective television show, and the draft is used to refresh the rosters of the brand divisions, typically between the Raw and SmackDown brands. The 2021 draft was WWE's 16th draft and was officially announced during the September 13 episode of Raw. It was scheduled to occur during the October 1 and October 4 episodes of SmackDown and Raw, respectively, with SmackDown airing on Fox and Raw on the USA Network.

=== 2021 draft rules ===
The rules of the 2021 draft were revealed by WWE correspondent Megan Morant on Twitter during the day before the first night of the draft on October 1. Over 60 wrestlers (including tag teams) were eligible to be drafted across the two nights, with half being eligible the first night and the other half eligible the second night; however, no draft pools were revealed for which wrestlers were eligible for each night. Tag teams were counted as one pick unless Fox or USA Network officials (who were promoted as draft decision makers) (Note: Although WWE claims the draft picks are conducted by officials of the Fox and USA networks, the results are predetermined by WWE as the draft is a storyline.) specifically only wanted one member of the team. Wrestlers from NXT were also eligible to be drafted to either Raw or SmackDown, while any non-NXT wrestlers who were not drafted became (kayfabe) free agents and could sign with the brand of their choice. Unlike previous drafts, in which results took effect immediately, results of the 2021 draft did not become effective until the October 22 episode of SmackDown, the night after the Crown Jewel pay-per-view and livestreaming event.

== Selections ==
=== Night 1: SmackDown (October 1) ===
There were four rounds of draft picks during night 1 of the 2021 draft. Unlike previous drafts in which Raw received three picks and SmackDown only received two, both brands had two picks each round. WWE officials Adam Pearce and Sonya Deville announced the draft picks.

Rnd.	Pick #	Wrestler(s) (Real name)	Pre-draft brand	Post-draft brand	Role	Brand pick #
1	1	Roman Reigns (Joe Anoa'i) with Paul Heyman	SmackDown	SmackDown	Male wrestler and manager Universal Champion (Reigns)	1
1	2	Big E (Ettore Ewen)	Raw	Raw	Male wrestler WWE Champion	1
1	3	Charlotte Flair	Raw	SmackDown	Female wrestler Raw Women's Champion	2
1	4	Bianca Belair	SmackDown	Raw	Female wrestler	2
2	5	Drew McIntyre	Raw	SmackDown	Male wrestler	3
2	6	RK-Bro (Randy Orton and Riddle)	Raw	Raw	Male tag team Raw Tag Team Champions	3
2	7	The New Day (Kofi Kingston and Xavier Woods)	Raw	SmackDown	Male tag team	4
2	8	Edge (Adam Copeland)	SmackDown (Note: Despite being listed as a free agent on WWE.com, Edge was referred to as a SmackDown wrestler during the Draft broadcast.)	Raw	Male wrestler Hall of Famer	4
3	9	Happy Corbin and Madcap Moss	SmackDown (Note: Despite being listed as a member of the Raw roster on WWE.com, Madcap Moss was referred to as a SmackDown wrestler during the Draft broadcast.)	SmackDown	Male tag team	5
3	10	Nikki A. S. H. and Rhea Ripley	Raw	Raw	Female tag team Women's Tag Team Champions	5
3	11	Hit Row (Isaiah "Swerve" Scott, Ashante "Thee" Adonis, Top Dolla, and B-Fab)	NXT	SmackDown	Intergender stable	6
3	12	Keith "Bearcat" Lee	Raw	Raw	Male wrestler	6
4	13	Naomi	Raw	SmackDown	Female wrestler	7
4	14	Rey Mysterio and Dominik Mysterio	SmackDown	Raw	Male tag team	7
4	15	Jeff Hardy	Raw	SmackDown	Male wrestler	8
4	16	Austin Theory	NXT	Raw	Male wrestler	8

Notes

1. One stable was split up as a result of the first night: Austin Theory was drafted to Raw while his Way stablemates, Johnny Gargano, Dexter Lumis, Candice LeRae, and Indi Hartwell, remained on NXT.

==== Night 1 supplemental picks (October 1–2) ====
These picks were announced on October 1 via WWE's social media accounts and on the October 2 episode of Talking Smack.

Wrestler(s) (Real name)	Pre-draft brand	Post-draft brand	Role
Akira Tozawa	Raw	Raw	Male wrestler
Aliyah	NXT	SmackDown	Female wrestler
Alpha Academy (Chad Gable and Otis)	SmackDown	Raw	Male tag team
Apollo Crews and Commander Azeez	SmackDown	Raw	Male tag team
Doudrop	Raw	Raw	Female wrestler
Drake Maverick (Note: While listed as a member of the NXT roster on WWE.com at the time of the draft, Drake Maverick had been appearing on the Raw program since September 6, 2021.)	NXT	Raw	Male wrestler
Drew Gulak	Raw	SmackDown	Male wrestler
John Morrison	Raw	Raw	Male wrestler
Mace	Raw	SmackDown	Male wrestler
Mansoor	Raw	SmackDown	Male wrestler
Mustafa Ali	Raw	SmackDown	Male wrestler
Nia Jax	Raw	Raw	Female wrestler
R-Truth	Raw	Raw	Male wrestler
Reggie	Raw	Raw	Male wrestler 24/7 Champion
T-Bar	Raw	Raw	Male wrestler
Toni Storm	SmackDown	SmackDown	Female wrestler
Zelina Vega	SmackDown	Raw	Female wrestler

Notes

1. One tag team was split up as a result of the supplemental draft: Mace was drafted to SmackDown while his tag team partner T-Bar remained on Raw.

=== Night 2: Raw (October 4) ===
There were six rounds of draft picks during night 2 of the 2021 draft. Like the first night, both brands had two picks each round. WWE officials Adam Pearce and Sonya Deville again announced the draft picks.

Rnd.	Pick #	Wrestler(s) (Real name)	Pre-draft brand	Post-draft brand	Role	Brand pick #
1	1	Becky Lynch	SmackDown	Raw	Female wrestler SmackDown Women's Champion	1
1	2	The Usos (Jey Uso and Jimmy Uso)	SmackDown	SmackDown	Male tag team SmackDown Tag Team Champions	1
1	3	The Hurt Business (Bobby Lashley with MVP) (Note: MVP was not announced to have been drafted along with Bobby Lashley on the broadcast, but was officially confirmed on WWE's social media platforms to have been drafted with Lashley.)	Raw	Raw	Male wrestler and manager	2
1	4	Sasha Banks	SmackDown	SmackDown	Female wrestler	2
2	5	Seth Rollins	SmackDown	Raw	Male wrestler	3
2	6	King Nakamura and Rick Boogs	SmackDown (Note: Despite being listed as a free agent on WWE.com, Rick Boogs was referred to as a SmackDown wrestler during the Draft broadcast.)	SmackDown	Male tag team Intercontinental Champion (Nakamura)	3
2	7	Damian Priest	Raw	Raw	Male wrestler United States Champion	4
2	8	Sheamus	Raw	SmackDown	Male wrestler	4
3	9	AJ Styles and Omos	Raw	Raw	Male tag team	5
3	10	Shayna Baszler	Raw	SmackDown	Female Wrestler	
3	11	Kevin Owens	SmackDown	Raw	Male wrestler	6
3	12	Xia Li	NXT	SmackDown	Female wrestler	6
4	13	The Street Profits (Angelo Dawkins and Montez Ford)	SmackDown	Raw	Male tag team	7
4	14	The Viking Raiders (Erik and Ivar)	Raw	SmackDown	Male tag team	7
4	15	Finn Bálor	SmackDown	Raw	Male wrestler	8
4	16	Ricochet	Raw	SmackDown	Male wrestler	8
5	17	Karrion Kross	Raw	Raw	Male wrestler	9
5	18	Angel Garza and Humberto Carrillo	Raw	SmackDown	Male tag team	9
5	19	Alexa Bliss	Raw	Raw	Female wrestler	10
5	20	Cesaro	SmackDown	SmackDown	Male wrestler	10
6	21	Carmella	SmackDown	Raw	Female wrestler	11
6	22	Ridge Holland	NXT	SmackDown	Male wrestler	11
6	23	Gable Steveson	Free agent	Raw	Male wrestler	12
6	24	Sami Zayn	SmackDown	SmackDown	Male wrestler	12

Notes

1. One stable was split up as a result of the second night: Xia Li was drafted to SmackDown while her Tian Sha stablemates, Boa and Mei Ying, remained on NXT.
2. One tag team was split up as a result of the second night: Ridge Holland was drafted to SmackDown while his tag team partner Pete Dunne remained on NXT.

==== Night 2 supplemental picks (October 4) ====
These picks were announced on the October 4 episode of Raw Talk.

Wrestler(s) (Real name)	Pre-draft brand	Post-draft brand	Role
Dana Brooke	Raw	Raw	Female wrestler
The Dirty Dawgs (Dolph Ziggler and Robert Roode)	SmackDown	Raw	Male tag team
The Hurt Business (Cedric Alexander and Shelton Benjamin)	Raw	Raw	Male tag team
Jaxson Ryker	Raw	Raw	Male wrestler
Jinder Mahal and Shanky	Raw	SmackDown	Male tag team
Liv Morgan	SmackDown	Raw	Female wrestler
Mia Yim	Raw	Raw	Female wrestler
The Miz	Raw	Raw	Male wrestler
Natalya	SmackDown	SmackDown	Female wrestler
Shotzi	SmackDown	SmackDown	Female wrestler
Tamina	SmackDown	Raw	Female wrestler
Tegan Nox	SmackDown	Raw	Female wrestler
Veer	Raw	Raw	Male wrestler

Notes

1. One stable was split up as a result of the supplemental draft: Veer stayed on Raw while his stablemates, Jinder Mahal and Shanky, were drafted to SmackDown.
2. Two tag teams were split up as a result of the supplemental draft: Tegan Nox was drafted to Raw while her tag team partner Shotzi stayed on SmackDown, and Tamina was drafted to Raw while her tag team partner Natalya stayed on SmackDown.

=== Free agents ===
Within WWE storyline, a "free agent" referred to a contracted wrestler who had not been assigned to one of the company's five brands at the time—Raw, SmackDown, NXT, NXT UK, or 205 Live (the latter two were subdivisions of NXT). Several wrestlers were made free agents due to injury, inactivity, or simply not being drafted despite being an active member of the rosters. Wrestlers who became free agents could (kayfabe) sign with the brand of their choosing. The chart is organized by date.

Wrestler(s) (Real name)	Pre-draft brand	Reason for not being drafted (if any)	Subsequent status	Date	Notes
Brock Lesnar	Raw (Note: While listed as a member of the Raw roster on WWE.com at the time of the Draft, Brock Lesnar had been appearing exclusively on the SmackDown program without having officially joined that brand after returning at SummerSlam in August 2021.)	Contractual provision	Free agent	October 1, 2021	During night 1 of the draft, Lesnar announced that he was a free agent (implying it was due to a deal arranged by Paul Heyman), thus is eligible to appear on any brand.
Lucha House Party (Gran Metalik and Lince Dorado)	Raw	Were not drafted on either night	Released	November 4, 2021	Last appeared on the September 13, 2021, episode of Main Event. On November 4, both Dorado and Metalik were released from their WWE contracts.
Eva Marie	Raw	Was not drafted on either night	Released	November 4, 2021	Last appeared on the September 27, 2021, episode of Raw. On November 4, Marie was released from her WWE contract.
Shane Thorne	SmackDown	Was not drafted on either night	Released	November 18, 2021	Last wrestled a dark match on the September 24, 2021, episode of SmackDown. On November 18, Thorne was released from his WWE contract.
Maryse	Raw	Was not drafted on either night	Raw	November 29, 2021	Last appeared on the April 12, 2021, episode of Raw. Returned alongside her husband, The Miz, who was also returning after participating in Dancing with the Stars.
Ronda Rousey	Free agent	Inactive due to maternity leave	SmackDown	January 29, 2022	Last appeared at WrestleMania 35 in April 2019. Rousey made a surprise return at the Royal Rumble in the women's Royal Rumble match, winning it from the number 28 entry.
Elias	Raw	Was not drafted on either night	Raw	April 4, 2022	Last appeared in a pre-taped vignette on the August 23, 2021 episode of Raw. Returned with a new gimmick, that of Elias' younger brother, Ezekiel, but returned as Elias in October 2022.
Lacey Evans	Raw	Inactive due to maternity leave	SmackDown	April 8, 2022	Last appeared on the February 15, 2021, episode of Raw. Returned in a pre-taped vignette on SmackDown.
Asuka	Raw	Inactive due to a hand injury	Raw	April 25, 2022	Last appeared at Money in the Bank. Returned and interrupted Becky Lynch, who was also making her return.
Titus O'Neil	Raw	Was not drafted on either night	WWE Global Ambassador	July 18, 2022	Last appeared at WrestleMania 37 on April 10, 2021. Returned on the July 18, 2022, episode of Raw and announced he was a WWE Global Ambassador.
Bayley	SmackDown	Inactive due to torn ACL	Raw	July 30, 2022	Last appeared on the June 25, 2021, episode of SmackDown. Returned at the 2022 SummerSlam and aligned with Dakota Kai and Iyo Sky (making their main roster debuts) to from a stable called Damage Control. They confronted Raw Women's Champion Bianca Belair after she had successfully retained her title against Becky Lynch.

== Aftermath ==
During the draft, Raw drafted SmackDown Women's Champion Becky Lynch while SmackDown drafted Raw Women's Champion Charlotte Flair. Neither lost their respective championship before the October 22 episode of SmackDown, the night that the draft results went into effect. The day of the show, WWE announced that Flair and Lynch would exchange titles to keep the championships on their respective brands while going off script. In turn, Lynch became the Raw Women's Champion while Flair became the SmackDown Women's Champion.

Also during the draft, SmackDown drafted NXT North American Champion Isaiah "Swerve" Scott as part of his stable, Hit Row. Swerve claimed he would be taking the title to SmackDown, however, on the October 12 episode of NXT 2.0, Swerve lost the championship to Carmelo Hayes, thus keeping the North American Championship on NXT before the draft results went into effect on October 22.

In November, vignettes began airing to hype Veer's post-draft appearance on Raw. His ring name was changed to Veer Mahaan. He finally debuted in April 2022, but in October, he was moved to NXT.

On November 4, 2021, WWE released several wrestlers due to budget cuts. Mia Yim, Hit Row's B-Fab, Nia Jax, Karrion Kross, and Keith Lee were among those who were released, without a single appearance post-draft. Among those not drafted who were released included Eva Marie and Lucha House Party (Gran Metalik and Lince Dorado). Several NXT wrestlers were also released, including Franky Monet, Oney Lorcan, Ember Moon, Jeet Rama, Katrina Cortez, Trey Baxter, Zayda Ramier, Jessi Kamea, Harry Smith, and Kross' real-life fiancé, Scarlett, who served as Kross' on-screen manager when Kross was still in NXT and she was expected to eventually join Kross on Raw. On November 18, the remainder of Hit Row, John Morrison, Tegan Nox, Shane Thorne, Drake Maverick, and Jaxson Ryker were also released. Not long after, Jeff Hardy would be released on December 9 after being sent home from a live event tour and refusing rehab. On December 29, Toni Storm requested and was immediately granted a release from her contract. On February 24, 2022, it was reported that Cesaro and WWE had failed to agree on new contract terms and that he had quietly left WWE when his contract expired, ending his 11-year tenure in the company.

At WrestleMania 38 in April 2022, SmackDown's Universal Champion Roman Reigns defeated Raw's WWE Champion Brock Lesnar to win both championships, thus allowing Reigns to appear on both brands as the Undisputed WWE Universal Champion, then in May 2022, SmackDown Tag Team Champions The Usos (Jey Uso and Jimmy Uso) defeated Raw Tag Team Champions RK-Bro (Randy Orton and Riddle) to win both championships, thus allowing The Usos to appear on both brands as the Undisputed WWE Tag Team Champions. By proxy, this allowed other members of The Bloodline stable (Sami Zayn, Solo Sikoa, who was promoted from NXT to SmackDown in September, and the group's manager Paul Heyman) to appear on both brands. This subsequently increased cross-brand rivalries, with other wrestlers, like Kevin Owens, appearing on both shows, making brand division increasingly unclear.

Also in April 2022, Mustafa Ali was moved back to Raw, then in June, Apollo Crews and Commander Azeez were moved to NXT. Azeez returned to his previous ring name of Dabba-Kato after he turned on Crews at NXT Vengeance Day in February 2023. In March 2022, Pete Dunne was promoted to SmackDown from NXT and repackaged under the nickname Butch. At Money in the Bank in July, Liv Morgan won the women's Money in the Bank ladder match, and later that same night, she cashed in the contract and won the SmackDown Women's Championship, subsequently transferring her to SmackDown. Later in October, Rey Mysterio was transferred to the SmackDown brand, and in turn, Happy Corbin, who returned to his Baron Corbin name, was moved to Raw. Also in October, Zelina Vega was moved back to SmackDown to be the manager of Legado Del Fantasma (Santos Escobar, Joaquin Wilde, and Cruz Del Toro), who were promoted to SmackDown from NXT. After taking time off in mid-2022, Reggie returned on NXT under a new gimmick and ring name of Scrypts. Shortly after, T-Bar returned to NXT as Dijak. Upon his return from an injury in January 2023, Rick Boogs was transferred to the Raw brand. Doudrop also returned to her previous name Piper Niven, which she used in NXT UK. The Judgment Day (Finn Bálor, Damian Priest, Dominik Mysterio, and Rhea Ripley), a stable formed on Raw after WrestleMania 38, began appearing on SmackDown after Ripley won the 2023 women's Royal Rumble match and chose to challenge for the SmackDown Women's Championship, which she subsequently won at WrestleMania 39.

After Triple H took over creative control of WWE in July 2022, several released wrestlers who were part of the 2021 draft were rehired. These included Mia Yim returning on Raw (aligning with the recently reunited O.C. stable in their feud with The Judgment Day), and Hit Row (Ashante Adonis, Top Dolla, and B-Fab), Tegan Nox, and Karrion Kross and his real-life fiancé, Scarlett, returning on SmackDown. Nia Jax made a one-night return at the 2023 Royal Rumble, where she was the #30 entrant in the women's Royal Rumble match, being eliminated by all other women in the ring.

A draft was not held in 2022, and with multiple wrestlers appearing on both shows almost weekly, some sources believed that the brand split was coming to an end. Additionally, both of NXT's sub-brands, 205 Live and NXT UK, ceased operations in February and September, respectively, with most of those wrestlers moving over to NXT. However, in April 2023, Triple H announced the 2023 draft to bring back a definitive roster division between Raw and SmackDown.
