= Ashante "Thee" Adonis =

American professional wrestler (born 1992)

Personal information
- Born: Tehuti Miles; November 23, 1992 (age 33) Hammonton, New Jersey, U.S.

Professional wrestling career
- Ring name(s): Tehuti Miles; Elijah King; Ashante Adonis; Ashante "Thee" Adonis
- Billed height: 5 ft 10 in (178 cm)
- Billed weight: 215 lb (98 kg)
- Trained by: Matt Bloom; MCW Pro Wrestling; Norman Smiley; Robbie Brookside; WWE Performance Center
- Debut: 2018
- Military service
- Allegiance: United States
- Branch: United States Army
- Service years: 2008–2013

Tehuti Miles (born November 23, 1992) is an American professional wrestler. He is signed to All Elite Wrestling (AEW) and Ring of Honor (ROH), where he performs under his real name and is a member of Shane Taylor Promotions (STP). He is best known for his time in WWE, where he performed under the ring name Ashante "Thee" Adonis.

== Early life ==
Miles was born in Hammonton, New Jersey. Miles enlisted in the United States Army, serving from 2008 until 2013, after graduating from Hammonton High School in 2008. During his enlistment, Miles served a combat tour in Afghanistan through the middle of years 2010 and 2011. After serving, Miles attended the University of Maryland, where he played Division 1 football as the team's running back.

== Professional wrestling career ==
=== MCW Pro Wrestling (2018–2019) ===
Miles visited local promotion MCW Pro Wrestling where he learned how to wrestle and trained at the company's wrestling center. In 2018, Miles began performing under the ring name Elijah King. On January 19, 2019, King won the MCW Rage Television Championship.

=== Ring of Honor (2018–2019) ===
King made his debut for Ring of Honor (ROH) competing in a dark match at the television tapings on November 3, 2018. King teamed with Dante Caballero and Joe Keys in a six-man tag match against Cheeseburger, Eli Isom and Ryan Nova, but his team was not successful. He would wrestle his first singles match for the promotion (under his real name) on November 23, losing to Ken Dixon in a match taped for ROH's YouTube series "Future of Honor".

King's last match for ROH took place on January 26, 2019, with him losing to Andy Dalton in a dark match.

=== WWE (2019–2021) ===
On January 9, 2019, it was reported as that Miles was invited to train at the WWE Performance Center. He made his debut on the April 1, 2019, episode of Raw while under the ring name Elijah King. Miles made his debut, where he appeared in a backstage segment with another local wrestler by the name of Brandon Scott, losing in a 2-on-1 Handicap match against Braun Strowman. In August 2020, Miles officially signed with WWE.

Miles was assigned to the NXT brand where he worked in matches on both 205 Live and NXT throughout the years from 2019 to 2021 as a face, competing against talents such as Tyler Breeze, Danny Burch, The Brian Kendrick, Drake Maverick, Ariya Daivari, Cameron Grimes, Daniel Vidot, Dexter Lumis, Tony Nese and August Grey while being given the ring name Ashante "Thee" Adonis until he was included as part of the stable Hit Row alongside Isaiah "Swerve" Scott, Top Dolla and B-Fab on the May 18, 2021 episode of NXT, turning heel in the process. On NXT, Hit Row feuded and had matches against teams such as Tony Nese and Ariya Daivari, Ever-Rise, Imperium, and Legado Del Fantasma. On October 1, 2021, Adonis along with Hit Row were called up to the SmackDown brand in the 2021 WWE Draft but only wrestled one match before being released on November 18, 2021.

=== Independent circuit (2022) ===
Following his release from WWE, Miles reverted to performing under his real name, and the rest of Hit Row, would begin appearing on various independent promotions, under the team name, The HitMakerZ.

=== Return to WWE (2022–2025) ===
On the August 12, 2022, episode of SmackDown, Hit Row made their unannounced return to WWE as fan favorites. On the December 16 episode of SmackDown, Hit Row beat The Viking Raiders and Legado Del Fantasma (Joaquin Wilde and Cruz Del Toro) in a triple threat tag team match for an Undisputed WWE Tag Team Championship opportunity against The Usos but failed to win the titles the following week. On the January 6, 2023 episode of SmackDown, Top Dolla was defeated by Ricochet in a Royal Rumble qualifying match. After the match, Hit Row attacked Ricochet, turning heel for the first time on the main roster. Adonis made his singles main roster in-ring debut on the May 26 episode of SmackDown in a losing effort to Cameron Grimes. Hit Row was quietly disbanded after Top Dolla was released in September.

On December 8, Adonis and Cedric Alexander defeated Pretty Deadly (Elton Prince and Kit Wilson) in a dark match on SmackDown with B-Fab in their corner as Adonis picked up the win. On February 9, 2024, Adonis and Alexander officially became a tag team by making their first televised appearance in a vignette. During the 2024 WWE Draft Adonis and Alexander remained on SmackDown but the tag team was disbanded after Adonis and Alexander were moved to the NXT roster from SmackDown after only 1 promo on SmackDown.

On the July 23 episode of NXT Ashante & Cedric were seen as a tag team for the last time as Adonis and Alexander officially returned to the NXT brand and confronted Trick Williams. Later on that night in his NXT return match on the July 23 episode of NXT, Adonis was defeated by The Meta-Four's Oro Mensah. Around September, Alexander quietly split from Adonis and formed an alliance with Je'Von Evans. On the October 15 episode of NXT, Adonis faced off against Brooks Jensen in a losing effort after getting distracted by Karmen Petrovic, with whom Adonis has been involved in a romance storyline weeks prior. On the November 19 episode of NXT, Adonis and Petrovic teamed up for the first time to defeat Dion Lennox and Brinley Reece in a mixed tag team match. On the December 24 episode of NXT, Adonis defeated Lennox in a singles match after interference from Nikkita Lyons. On the January 14, 2025 episode of NXT, Adonis and Petrovic became an official on-screen couple. On the April 29 episode of NXT, Adonis scheduled a NXT Women's North American Championship match for Petrovic, who was not prepared for the match and went on to lose against the new NXT Women's North American Champion Sol Ruca. After the match, Petrovic attacked Adonis as he berated her, seemingly breaking up with him. On August 10, Adonis announced that his WWE contract had expired and was not renewed, ending his 3-year second run with the company.

=== Total Nonstop Action Wrestling (2025) ===
With a multi-year working partnership between WWE and Total Nonstop Action Wrestling (TNA) in January 2025, Adonis made his TNA debut at Genesis on January 19 in a losing effort to Jake Something in the pre-show.

=== All Elite Wrestling / Return to ROH (2025–present) ===
In September 2025, Miles signed with All Elite Wrestling (AEW). On the March 1, 2026 tapings of Ring of Honor Wrestling , Miles made his ROH return (now the sister promotion to AEW) under his real name and defeated Serpentico. On the August 6 episode of ROH Wrestling, Miles joined Shane Taylor Promotions (STP).

== Music ==
On July 21, 2023, Miles (as Ashante "Thee" Adonis), alongside then-members of Hit Row Briana Brandy (B-Fab) and A.J. Francis (Top Dolla) dropped a freestyle single by the name of Barbie Barz.

== Other media ==
=== Other digital appearances ===
Miles also made an appearance in the music video for Dominique Danielle's 2022 song "Come Through".

=== Video games ===
Miles, as Ashante "Thee" Adonis, along with fellow Hit Row members Top Dolla, and B-Fab (as a Manager; and probably Non-Playable), made his video game debut in WWE 2K23 as a DLC character in the Steiner Row Pack DLC bundle and in WWE 2K24 and WWE 2K25.

== Personal life ==
In August 2022, Miles bailed fellow professional wrestler Patrick Clark Jr. (who is best known for his time in NXT under the ring name Velveteen Dream) out of jail, with the latter having been incarcerated for first degree battery and first degree trespassing on property after warning.

== Championships and accomplishments ==
- MCW Pro Wrestling
  - MCW Rage Television Championship (1 time)
