= Rick Boogs =

American professional wrestler

Personal information
- Born: Eric Bugenhagen; December 21, 1987 (age 38) Franklin, Wisconsin, U.S.
- Education: University of Wisconsin–Madison

Professional wrestling career
- Ring name(s): Eric Bugenhagen; Joseph Average; The Nightpanther; Ric Boog; Rick Boogs; Rik Bugez; Rick the Stick; Sticky Ricky
- Billed height: 6 ft 2 in (188 cm)
- Billed weight: 285 lb (129 kg)
- Billed from: Madison, Wisconsin
- Trained by: WWE Performance Center
- Debut: October 19, 2017
- Retired: January 4, 2024

YouTube information
- Channel: Eric Bugenhagen
- Genres: Comedy; Weight training; Fitness; Mindset
- Subscribers: 353,000
- Views: 179,633,336
- Last updated: November 20, 2025

Eric Bugenhagen (born December 21, 1987) is an American fitness personality, YouTuber, amateur pickleball player, retired professional wrestler and graduated collegiate wrestler. He is best known for his tenure with WWE from 2017 to 2023, where he performed under the ring name Rick Boogs.

== Background and amateur wrestling ==
Bugenhagen was born and raised in Franklin, Wisconsin. He began wrestling in 7th grade after being inspired to do so by his older brother. Bugenhagen attended Franklin High School, where he won 3 Southeast Conference championships along with a state championship his senior year.

Bugenhagen wrestled for the NCAA Division I University of Wisconsin team under Barry Davis. Bugenhagen competed for the Wisconsin Badgers from 2006 to 2011, starting at 184 pounds in his sophomore season and at heavyweight for his junior and senior years. Bugenhagen competed at the NCAA Championships twice, qualifying for the 2010 and 2011 tournaments in Omaha and Philadelphia, respectively. He went 2–4 at the NCAAs and also wrestled in a United States Olympic Trials Qualifier. Bugenhagen graduated with a degree in history and worked as a wrestling coach for his alma mater after graduating.

In 2014 Bugenhagen competed in the United States Amateur Powerlifting League Wisconsin State Open. He completed a bench press of 375 pounds, and deadlifted 604.9 pounds, for a total of 979.9 pounds, finishing first in the 242-pound class.

== Professional wrestling career ==
Bugenhagen made his professional wrestling debut on the October 19, 2017 episode of WWE NXT, where he lost to Lars Sullivan in a singles match. After an injury set him back significantly, he returned to wrestling at NXT live events under the ring name Ric Boogs. Under his real name, Bugenhagen lost to Drew Gulak on February 6, 2019, on NXT in his television debut. On the May 1, 2019 episode of WWE Worlds Collide, he participated in a 20-man battle royal as Rik Bugez. On the February 21, 2019 episode of WWE NXT Live, Bugez teamed up with Denzel Dejournette to unsuccessfully face the NXT Tag Team Champions of the time, The Viking Raiders (Ivar and Erik). A notable confrontation of his career took place on the February 22, 2020 episode of WWE NXT Live, where Bugez competed against Finn Balor in a losing effort.

While working on NXT, he also appeared at EVOLVE 143 and EVOLVE 144, two events promoted by Evolve during their relationship with WWE in January 2020.

Bugez made several appearances as an extra in the main shows, being one of the many NXT performers being used as part of a makeshift crowd on Raw at the beginning of the COVID-19 pandemic in 2020. Leading up to WrestleMania 37, Bugez played Old Spice representative character Joseph Average/The Nightpanther in several backstage advertisements at Fastlane and after WrestleMania 37, during which he defeated R-Truth and Akira Tozawa to capture the WWE 24/7 Championship twice.

On May 21, 2021, Bugez, now going by the tweaked ring name Rick Boogs, made his debut on SmackDown, playing Shinsuke Nakamura to the ring with an electric guitar. They also worked as a tag team, facing The Usos for the SmackDown Tag Team Championship at WrestleMania 38 Night 1, but during the match, Boogs suffered a torn quadriceps/patellar tendon injury, requiring surgery.

After a nine-month absence due to injury, Boogs made his return on the January 30, 2023, episode of Raw as the newest member of the roster, but during the 2023 WWE Draft, Boogs was drafted back to the SmackDown brand. At SummerSlam, Boogs competed in the Slim Jim Battle Royal where he was unsuccessful in winning. This would end up being Boogs' final appearance for the company as he was released from his contract on September 21. On January 4, 2024, he confirmed in an interview with Chris Van Vliet that he no longer wishes to wrestle anymore after his release from WWE, effectively announcing his retirement from professional wrestling.

== Other media ==
Bugenhagen appeared as Big Billy Beavers in the 2020 film The Main Event. He participated in the 2026 season of American Gladiators under the name "The Bull."

Bugenhagen, as Rick Boogs, made his video game debut in the Clowning Around DLC for WWE 2K22. He also appears in WWE 2K23.

In 2024 Bugenhagen became part owner of the pre-workout brand Psycho Pharma.

On social media, he styles himself by a number of aliases, including 'Professor Girth', 'Doctor Density', 'Mr. Sizzle', 'Rick de la Stick', and 'Juice del Hagen'.

== Championships and accomplishments ==
=== Amateur wrestling ===
- Wisconsin Interscholastic Athletic Association
  - 3x Southeast Conference champion
  - Wisconsin D1 lb state champion out of Franklin High School (2007)

=== Powerlifting ===
- United States Amateur Powerlifting League
  - Wisconsin State Open 242 pound Division champion (2014)

=== Pro wrestling ===
- Pro Wrestling Illustrated
  - Ranked No. 224 of the top 500 singles wrestlers in the PWI 500 in 2022
- WWE
  - WWE 24/7 Championship (2 times)
