= B-Fab =

American professional wrestler

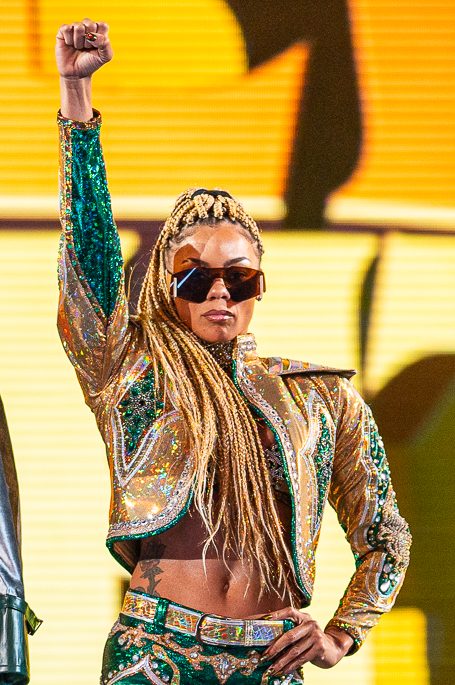
- B-Fab in 2024

Personal information
- Born: Briana Brandy; November 22, 1990 (age 35) Canton, Ohio, U.S.
- Relative: Je'Von Evans (cousin)

Professional wrestling career
- Ring name(s): B-Fab; Briana Brandy
- Billed height: 5 ft 9 in (175 cm)
- Billed from: Canton, Ohio
- Trained by: Dru Onyx; Tyson Kidd; Natalya Neidhart; Matt Bloom; Sara Del Rey
- Debut: December 5, 2019

Briana Brandy (born November 22, 1990) is an American professional wrestler and musician. As of August 2019, she is signed to WWE, where she performs on the SmackDown brand under the ring name B-Fab. She is currently one-half of the WWE Women's Tag Team Champions alongside Michin in their first reign, both as a team and individually.

== Early life ==
Briana Brandy was born on November 22, 1990 in Canton, Ohio. She played basketball and competed in swimming during her high school years.

== Professional wrestling career ==
=== WWE (2019–2021; 2022–present) ===
==== Hit Row (2019–2021; 2022–2023) ====
During summer of 2017, Brandy participated in a WWE tryout. On August 28, 2019, it was reported that WWE signed Brandy to a developmental contract. On December 5, 2019, Brandy made her debut during a live event during which she teamed with Taynara in a successful women's tag team match defeating Catalina Garcia and Rita Reis. The following year on February 28, 2020, she wrestled her first singles match at a NXT live event against Kayden Carter. On March 6 and March 7, Brandy wrestled her final live events, just one week before the COVID-19 pandemic was acknowledged in the United States, effectively restricting all sports businesses from holding live audience events. She wrestled only eight matches, between years 2019 and 2020. On the September 14 episode of NXT, Briana Brandy won her only singles match victory by defeating Katrina Cortez. Under her new name B-Fab, on the May 11, 2021 episode of NXT, she appeared alongside the recently formed the stable Hit Row. On the September 28 episode of NXT, her final match was a No Disqualification match against Elektra Lopez, but she was not successful.

B-Fab made her main roster debut at the SmackDown brand after being drafted alongside Hit Row during the 2021 WWE Draft. On November 8, 2021, she was released from her contract alongside Hit Row due to budget cuts. B-Fab and Ashante "Thee" Adonis managed Isaiah "Swerve" Scott and Top Dolla in one match on SmackDown before being released.

On the August 12, 2022 episode of SmackDown, Hit Row, minus Scott, made their unannounced return as faces, where Top Dolla and Adonis (accompanied by B-Fab) defeated two local competitors. B-Fab made her main roster in-ring debut at the women's Royal Rumble match as the seventh entrant at Royal Rumble on January 28, 2023. She was eliminated in 36 seconds by eventual winner Rhea Ripley. Hit Row was quietly disbanded with the release of Top Dolla in September 2023 and with Adonis being announced as a new tag team with Cedric Alexander in February 2024.

==== The Pride (2024–2025) ====
On the February 2, 2024 episode of SmackDown, B-Fab joined Bobby Lashley and The Street Profits as The Pride and took out The Final Testament's Scarlett. At Night 2 of WrestleMania XL on April 7, B-Fab assisted The Pride to defeat The Final Testament in a Philadelphia Street Fight match. On August 16, Lashley's profile on WWE's roster page was moved to the alumni section, ending his tenure with WWE and The Pride. As a result, The Pride was quietly disbanded. B-Fab continued managing The Street Profits, with no mention of The Pride as a stable. On the November 15 episode of SmackDown, B-Fab competed against Bayley and Women's Speed Champion Candice LeRae in a triple threat match in the preliminary round of the tournament to crown the inaugural Women's United States Champion, but was not successful due to Bayley pinning her.

==== Alliance with Michin and Jade Cargill (2025–present) ====
In February 2025, B-Fab quietly split from The Street Profits and aligned with Michin. On the March 13 episode of SmackDown held in Barcelona, she returned to the ring to face Charlotte Flair. Although she received emotional support from the Barcelona crowd, she lost the match. On the March 20, 2026 episode of SmackDown, B-Fab and Michin turned heel by attacking Rhea Ripley and aligned themselves with Jade Cargill. On the October 23 episode of SmackDown, B-Fab and Michin defeated WWE Women's Tag Team Champions Alexa Bliss and Tatum Paxley for the title, winning their first championship in WWE. On the November 9 episode of Raw, Fatal Influence (Jacy Jayne, Fallon Henley, and Lainey Reid) assisted and allied with Cargill, Michin and B-Fab to attack Flair, Bliss and Paxley.

=== Independent circuit (2022) ===
Following her release from WWE, Brandy and the rest of Hit Row appeared on the independent circuit under the team name The HitMakerZ.

== Other media ==
Brandy, as B-Fab, made her video game debut in WWE 2K23 as a non-playable character in the Steiner Row Pack DLC bundle. B-Fab was featured as a manager in WWE 2K24 and as a playable character in WWE 2K25 and WWE 2K26.

== Music career ==
Brandy's involvement in music includes tours with the rap artists Soulja Boy and Jadakiss as well as work with Juicy J, Ying Yang Twins, Too $hort, Young Dro, and Kurupt. Brandy has also released multiple songs since 2013 that have made it ITunes Apple Music.

On March 6, 2023, Hit Row was once more partially fully reunited as rapper Monteasy dropped a music video by the name of "Price Went Up". On July 21, 2023, Brandy, alongside Hit Row members, dropped a freestyle single by the name of Barbie Barz.

== Personal life ==
Brandy is the cousin of fellow professional wrestler Malachi Jeffers, known by his ring name Je'Von Evans.

Her athletic background includes work as a boxing coach. Brandy also trained in ninjutsu and has been involved in CrossFit.

== Championships and accomplishments ==
- WWE
  - WWE Women's Tag Team Championship (1 time, current) – with Michin
