= Hit Row =

Professional wrestling stable

- Hit Row logo

Stable
- Members: Isaiah "Swerve" Scott; Top Dolla / Fran¢ B-Fab / Briana Brandy (manager); Ashante "Thee" Adonis / Tehuti Miles
- Name(s): Hit Row; The HitMakerZ
- Debut: May 4, 2021
- Disbanded: February 2, 2024
- Years active: 2021–2024

Hit Row was an American professional wrestling stable consisting of Isaiah "Swerve" Scott, Ashante "Thee" Adonis, Top Dolla, and manager B-Fab. They performed in WWE on the NXT and SmackDown brands. After their release from WWE in November 2021, they have worked the independent circuit under the name The HitMakerZ. In August 2022, the stable returned to WWE without Scott. Top Dolla was released from the group in September 2023 due to roster cuts. In February 2024, B-Fab aligned herself with Bobby Lashley's new stable The Pride, and Adonis was announced to be forming a new tag team with Cedric Alexander, privately disbanding Hit Row. Today, as of 2026, only B-Fab remains employed with the WWE as a former member of Hit Row.

== History ==
=== WWE (2020-2021) ===
==== NXT (2020–2021) ====
In October 2020 at TakeOver 31, Isaiah "Swerve" Scott faced Santos Escobar for the NXT Cruiserweight Championship and during the match, Joaquin Wilde and Raul Mendoza attempted to interfere on Escobar's behalf but were thwarted off by Ashante "Thee" Adonis, who entered to save Scott. However, Scott ultimately lost the match against Escobar. In January 2021, Scott was paired up with Jake Atlas to compete in the Dusty Rhodes Tag Team Classic tournament. They were eliminated in the first round by eventual winners MSK (Wes Lee and Nash Carter) and following the match proceeded to argue. On the February 17 episode of NXT, Scott attacked Leon Ruff after losing a match against him, turning heel in the process.

Scott and Ruff continued to feud with it culminating on the May 4, 2021 episode of NXT where Scott defeated Ruff following interference from a debuting A. J. Francis. Following the match, Scott and Francis were joined by Ashante "Thee" Adonis, and Briana Brandy. The following week, Francis and Brandy were introduced as Top Dolla and B-Fab, respectively, and the group were named Hit Row. On the May 18 episode of NXT, Adonis and Top Dolla debuted as a tag team and defeated Ariya Daivari and Tony Nese.

On the June 29 episode of NXT, Scott defeated Bronson Reed to capture the NXT North American Championship, giving the stable their first title. They wrestled only four more matches, sometime after the group was drafted to the SmackDown brand where Adonis showed his final appearance on the NXT brand alongside Hit Row as the show was transformed into the new NXT 2.0. Their final match was held on the August 24 episode of NXT 2.0, losing a six-man tag match to Legado Del Fantasma (Joaquin Wilde, Raul Mendoza & Santos Escobar) while B-Fab feuded on and off again in the ring with Elektra Lopez, who was the opposing team's female valet and manager as B-Fab was to Hit Row.

==== SmackDown (2021) ====
On October 1, 2021, Hit Row was called up to the main roster and drafted to SmackDown. Isaiah "Swerve" Scott and Top Dolla wrestled their main roster debut tag team match against two local competitors while Adonis and B-Fab managed the two in their corner on the October 22 episode of SmackDown. Despite the stable being drafted to SmackDown as part of the 2021 WWE Draft, B-Fab was released on November 4, while Adonis, Top Dolla, and Scott were released 15 days later as part of a seventh round of layoffs due to the COVID-19 pandemic that involved administrative staff, plant and talents.

=== Independent circuit (2022) ===
After three months of inactivity following the WWE releases, Hit Row reunited at the MCW Pro Wrestling Spring Fever show under the name the HitMakerZ on March 19, 2022 in Parkville, Maryland, without Scott, who had signed with All Elite Wrestling (AEW). On August 6, Top Dolla made his return to Coastal Championship Wrestling in Hialeah, Florida, under the ring name FRAN¢; attacking Cha Cha Charlie in the main event of Bash At The Brew 19.

=== Return to WWE (2022–2024) ===
On the August 12, 2022 episode of SmackDown, Hit Row made their unannounced return without Scott as faces, where Top Dolla and Ashante "Thee" Adonis (accompanied by B-Fab) defeated two local competitors. Shortly afterwards, Hit Row began a feud with Maximum Male Models (ma.çé and mån.sôör) which they defeated the latter on the September 2 edition of SmackDown.

On the December 16 episode of SmackDown, Hit Row beat The Viking Raiders and Legado Del Fantasma (Joaquin Wilde and Cruz Del Toro) in a triple threat tag team match for an Undisputed WWE Tag Team Championship opportunity against The Usos. On the December 23 episode of SmackDown, The Usos beat Hit Row to retain the championship.

On the January 6, 2023 episode of SmackDown, Top Dolla was defeated by Ricochet in a Royal Rumble qualifying match. After the match, Hit Row attacked Ricochet. B-Fab made her main roster in-ring debut at the 2023 Women's Royal Rumble match as the seventh entrant. She was eliminated in 36 seconds by eventual winner Rhea Ripley. Adonis made his singles main roster in-ring debut on the May 26 episode of SmackDown in a losing effort to Cameron Grimes. On September 21, 2023, along with a host of WWE superstars, Top Dolla was released again from his WWE contract.

On February 2, 2024, it was revealed that B-Fab had joined Bobby Lashley's new stable The Pride. The following week, WWE announced that Ashante would be in a new tag team with Cedric Alexander, effectively ending Hit Row.

== Members ==
*	Founding member(s)
L	Leader
M	Manager

Member		Joined	Left
Isaiah "Swerve" Scott	*L	May 4, 2021	November 19, 2021
Top Dolla	*	May 4, 2021	September 21, 2023
B-Fab	*M	May 4, 2021	February 2, 2024
Ashante "Thee" Adonis	*	May 4, 2021	February 2, 2024

== Music careers ==
The members of Hit Row are all featured on the stable's WWE theme song titled "Now You Know" (later remixed as "Best of the Best”) which was released by the company on streaming services in 2021. They had also previously been involved with the music industry, recording music independently and collaborating with other artists. Briana Brandy (aka B-Fab) has released multiple songs since 2013 that have made it ITunes Apple Music. Tehuti Miles also made an appearance in the music video for Dominique Danielle's 2022 song "Come Through".

On March 6, 2023 Hit Row was once more partially fully reunited as a music video was dropped where it was musical artist Montesy featuring A. J. Francis (aka FRAN¢ / aka Top Dolla), Rich Latta, Swerve Strickland (aka Swerve The Realest / aka Isaiah "Swerve" Scott former member) & Briana Brandy (aka B-Fab) dropped a music video by the name of Price Went Up.

On July 21, 2023 three members of Hit Row by the names of B-Fab, Top Dolla and Ashante "Thee" Adonis dropped a freestyle single by the name of Barbie Barz.

== Other media ==
- Isaiah "Swerve" Scott made his video game debut in WWE 2K22 after his WWE release; this was due to Isaiah being a member of the 2020 NXT Breakout Superstars alongside Angel (formerly Angel Garza).
- Ashante "Thee" Adonis, Top Dolla, & B-Fab (exclusively as a manager) made their video game debut in WWE 2K23 as DLC characters in the Steiner Row Pack DLC bundle.

== Championships and accomplishments ==
- WWE
  - NXT North American Championship (1 time) – Isaiah "Swerve" Scott
