= Royal Rumble (2023) =

WWE premium live event

- Promotional poster featuring various WWE wrestlers
- Promotion: WWE
- Brand(s): Raw; SmackDown; NXT
- Date: January 28, 2023
- City: San Antonio, Texas
- Venue: Alamodome
- Attendance: 42,928

WWE event chronology
← Previous; NXT Deadline	Next → NXT Vengeance Day

Royal Rumble chronology
← Previous; 2022	Next → 2024

The 2023 Royal Rumble was a professional wrestling premium live event (PLE) produced by WWE, held for wrestlers from the promotion's main roster brands, Raw and SmackDown. It was the 36th annual Royal Rumble and took place on Saturday, January 28, 2023, at the Alamodome in San Antonio, Texas. The event was held as part of the Alamodome's 30th-anniversary celebration and was the third Royal Rumble to take place at the venue, after 1997 and 2017. It was subsequently the fourth overall Royal Rumble held in San Antonio, including the 2007 event at the AT&T Center.

The event was based around the Royal Rumble match, a modified 30-person battle royal in which the participants enter at timed intervals instead of all beginning in the ring at the same time and the respective men's and women's winners received a world championship match at WrestleMania. For the 2023 event, only the women's winner received a choice of which world championship to challenge for at WrestleMania 39. Due to Raw's WWE Championship and SmackDown's Universal Championship being held and defended together as the Undisputed WWE Universal Championship since WrestleMania 38 in April 2022, the men's winner received a match for the undisputed title, while the women had their choice between the Raw Women's Championship or SmackDown Women's Championship. This was the first and only Royal Rumble since 2016 in which the men only had one choice. While the men's Royal Rumble match is typically the main event of the card, this was the eighth Royal Rumble event in which the match was not the main event, after 1988, 1996, 1997, 1998, 2006, 2013, and 2018, the latter of which the main event was the inaugural women's Rumble match. It was also the first Royal Rumble event where the eponymous match opened the show.

Five matches were contested on the card. In the main event, Roman Reigns defeated Kevin Owens to retain the Undisputed WWE Universal Championship. On the undercard, Raw's Rhea Ripley won the 2023 Women's Royal Rumble match by last eliminating SmackDown's Liv Morgan, becoming the first woman to win the match from the number one spot as well as setting the record for longest time spent in the women's Rumble at 1:01:08 (which was broken in 2024 by Bayley at 1:03:03), while Raw's Cody Rhodes won the 2023 Men's Royal Rumble match in the show's opener by last eliminating No. 1 entrant Gunther from SmackDown, with Gunther setting the record for longest time spent in a men's 30-man Rumble at 1:11:40 and the second man to draw No. 1 and emerge as runner-up. In another prominent match, Bray Wyatt, in his first televised match since WrestleMania 37 in April 2021, defeated LA Knight in a Pitch Black match in a cross-promotion with Mountain Dew. This would also be Wyatt's final televised match as he contracted COVID-19 the following month, which exacerbated a heart issue and he died of a heart attack in August. The event also saw the return of color commentator Pat McAfee, who joined Michael Cole and Corey Graves on commentary, Cody Rhodes, Edge, Beth Phoenix, Asuka, Chelsea Green and Nia Jax made returns, and Logan Paul made his first Royal Rumble appearance. Former WWE wrestler Michelle McCool also made an appearance in the women's Royal Rumble match, while WWE Hall of Famer and NXT commentator Booker T appeared in the men's.

This was the first Royal Rumble to livestream on Disney+ in the Philippines, following the shutdown of its version of the WWE Network in November. It was also WWE's first PLE to livestream on Binge in Australia following the merger of its version of the WWE Network under Binge just five days before the event on January 23. This was the last Royal Rumble in which the women's world championships were named after their respective brands, as during the 2023 WWE Draft, the titles switched brands with the Raw and SmackDown titles renamed as WWE Women's Championship and Women's World Championship, respectively, in June. A new World Heavyweight Championship was also introduced in April and became exclusive to Raw after the Undisputed WWE Universal Championship became exclusive to SmackDown in the draft, giving future men's Royal Rumble winners two choices again.

== Production ==
=== Background ===
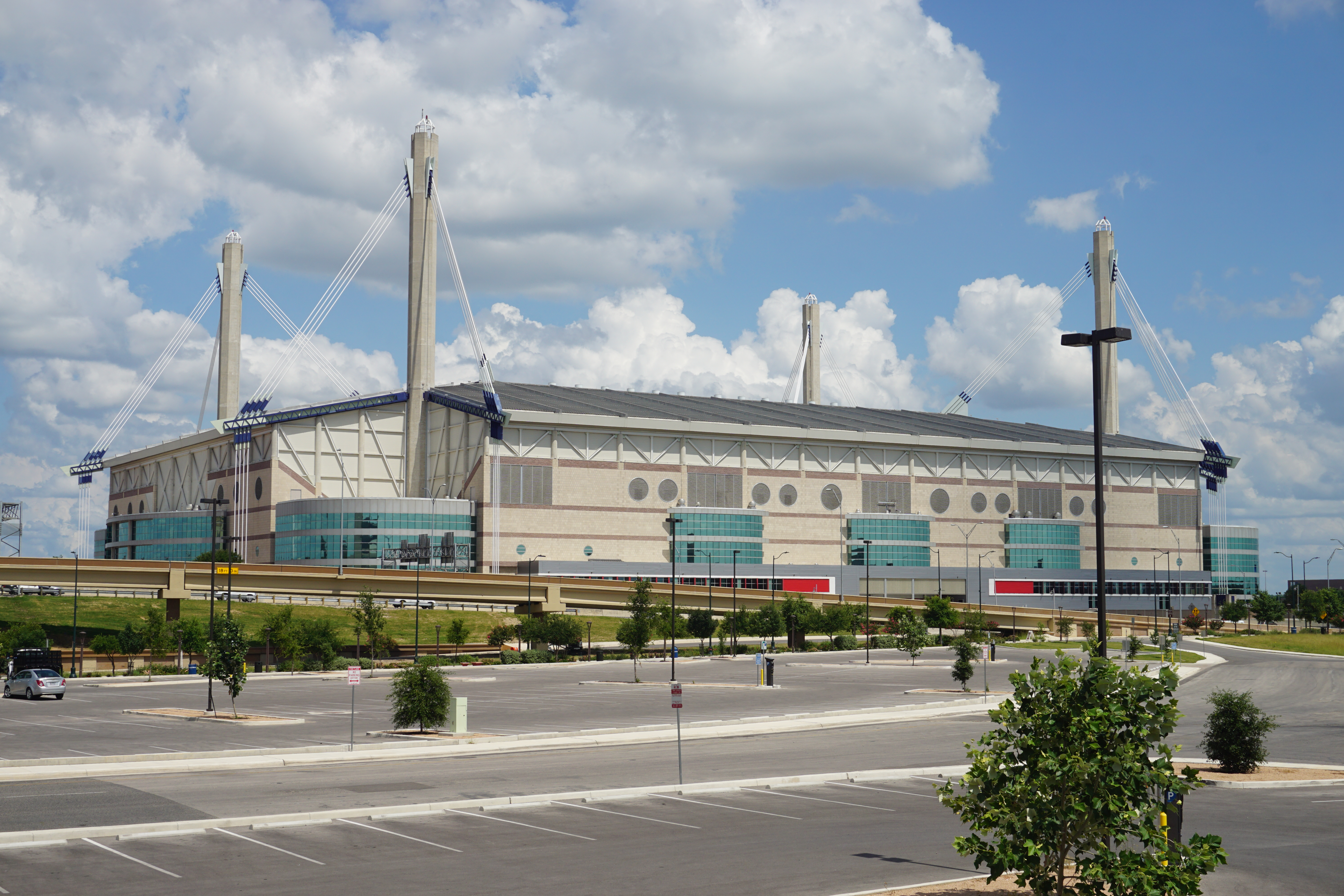
The 36th annual Royal Rumble was the third time for the event to be held at the Alamodome in San Antonio, Texas, after 1997 and 2017, and fourth overall in San Antonio, after 2007.

The Royal Rumble is an annual professional wrestling premium live event (PLE), produced every January by WWE since 1988; that first event was a television special before it became a pay-per-view (PPV) event beginning in 1989 and then also simulcast on WWE's livestreaming platforms since 2015. It is one of the promotion's original four PPVs, along with WrestleMania, SummerSlam, and Survivor Series, referred to as the "Big Four", and as of August 2021, it is considered one of the "Big Five", along with Money in the Bank. It is named after and centered on the Royal Rumble match.

Announced on September 7, 2022, the 36th Royal Rumble was scheduled to be held on Saturday, January 28, 2023, at the Alamodome in San Antonio, Texas, featuring wrestlers from the Raw and SmackDown brand divisions. It was held as part of the Alamodome's 30th-anniversary celebration and was the third Royal Rumble event to be held at the venue, after the 1997 and 2017 events, and the fourth overall to be held in San Antonio, including the 2007 event, which was at the AT&T Center. Tickets went on sale on September 30, 2022, with premium hospitality packages also available. The official theme song was "Sold Out" by country music singer Hardy, who performed the song live during the event.

The Royal Rumble match is a modified battle royal in which the participants enter at timed intervals instead of all beginning in the ring at the same time, and the match generally features 30 wrestlers. Since 1993, the winner traditionally earns a world championship match at that year's WrestleMania. For 2023, just the women's match winner received a choice of which world championship to challenge for at WrestleMania 39. Due to Raw's WWE Championship and SmackDown's Universal Championship being held and defended together as the Undisputed WWE Universal Championship since WrestleMania 38 in April 2022, the men's winner received a match for the undisputed title, while the women had their choice between the Raw Women's Championship or SmackDown Women's Championship.

=== Broadcast outlets ===
The PLE was available through traditional PPV outlets worldwide. It was also available to livestream on Peacock in the United States, SonyLIV in India, Disney+ Hotstar in Indonesia, Disney+ in the Philippines, Binge in Australia, and the WWE Network everywhere else. It was the first Royal Rumble to livestream on Disney+ in the Philippines, following the shutdown of its version of the WWE Network in November 2022, and it was WWE's first PLE to livestream on Binge in Australia after the Australian version of the WWE Network merged under Foxtel's channel Binge on January 23, just five days before the Royal Rumble.

=== Storylines ===
The event included five matches that resulted from scripted storylines. Results were predetermined by WWE's writers on the Raw and SmackDown brands, while storylines were produced on WWE's weekly television shows, Monday Night Raw and Friday Night SmackDown.

On December 26, 2022, WWE's YouTube channel promoted a "Pitch Black match" to be held at the Royal Rumble in a cross-promotion with Mountain Dew for the return of the "Pitch Black" flavor. On the December 30 episode of SmackDown, following a couple of months of alleged attacks by Bray Wyatt on LA Knight, with Wyatt claiming it was someone named Uncle Howdy, Knight challenged Wyatt to a match at the Royal Rumble, and Wyatt accepted. Howdy then appeared and attacked Wyatt. It was later confirmed that this would be the Pitch Black match. This would also notably be Wyatt's first televised match since WrestleMania 37 in April 2021. During an appearance on the WWE After The Bell podcast on January 4, 2023, Knight said the only thing he knew about the match was that it would essentially be a street fight "kind of in the dark". On the January 6 episode of SmackDown, commentator Michael Cole further stated that the match would be "anything goes" and could only be won via pinfall or submission, but nothing else was known.

At Survivor Series: WarGames, Kevin Owens, who had past issues with Roman Reigns, was one of the members of the opposing team in a WarGames match against Reigns's team, The Bloodline. The two previously feuded over the Universal Championship only for Owens to constantly lose due to interference from members of The Bloodline, including their manager Paul Heyman—Owens and Reigns's last title match was at the 2021 Royal Rumble. The Bloodline was victorious at Survivor Series thanks to Sami Zayn—Owens's former best friend—betraying Owens to show his loyalty to The Bloodline. Despite the loss, Owens continued to target The Bloodline over the next few weeks and Owens teamed with a returning John Cena to defeat Reigns and Zayn on the December 30, 2022, episode of SmackDown, where Owens pinned Zayn. The following week, Owens challenged Reigns for the Undisputed WWE Universal Championship at the Royal Rumble, which was made official.

On the December 12, 2022, episode of Raw, Alexa Bliss defeated Bayley to become the number one contender for the Raw Women's Championship. After the match, champion Bianca Belair congratulated Bliss and as the two hugged, Bray Wyatt's logo appeared on the TitanTron (due to Bliss's past association with Wyatt) and Bliss positioned Belair for a Sister Abigail but came back to her senses before performing the move. The following week, Belair and Bliss were interviewed backstage, where at the end of the segment, Wyatt's logo again appeared on the screen and Bliss hit Belair over the head with a vase of flowers. During her championship match against Belair on January 2, 2023, episode, Bliss was distracted by people wearing Uncle Howdy masks, and after Wyatt's logo appeared on the TitanTron, Bliss attacked the referee, forcing a disqualification and allowing Belair to retain. After the match, Bliss attacked Belair, performing two DDTs on the steel stairs. On the January 16 episode, Belair challenged Bliss to a championship rematch at the Royal Rumble, and Bliss accepted. The two then brawled with Bliss getting the upper hand after an appearance by Howdy.

On the January 16, 2023, episode of Raw, after weeks of footage showing Cody Rhodes's journey to recovery from a torn pec he suffered before Hell in a Cell in June 2022, Rhodes announced that he would be returning from his injury as an entrant in the men's Royal Rumble match.

== Event ==
Other on-screen personnel
Role:	Name:
English commentators	Michael Cole
English commentators	Corey Graves
English commentators	Pat McAfee
Spanish commentators	Marcelo Rodriguez
Spanish commentators	Jerry Soto
Ring announcers	Mike Rome (Raw/Men's Royal Rumble match)
Ring announcers	Samantha Irvin (SmackDown/Women's Royal Rumble match)
Singer	Hardy
Referees	Danilo Anfibio
Referees	Jason Ayers
Referees	Shawn Bennett
Referees	Dan Engler
Referees	Daphanie LaShaunn
Referees	Eddie Orengo
Referees	Chad Patton
Referees	Charles Robinson
Referees	Ryan Tran
Referees	Rod Zapata
Pre-show panel	Kayla Braxton
Pre-show panel	Kevin Patrick
Pre-show panel	Peter Rosenberg
Pre-show panel	Booker T
Pre-show panel	Jerry Lawler

=== Preliminary matches ===
The PLE opened with the men's Royal Rumble match for an Undisputed WWE Universal Championship match at WrestleMania 39: notably, this was the first time the eponymous match began the event. Gunther and Sheamus began the match. The Miz entered at No. 3 and tried distracting Sheamus to allow Gunther to eliminate him, however, Sheamus fought off Gunther and Miz. Sheamus chased Miz around the ring, however, Gunther subdued Miz. With the assistance of Johnny Gargano (#5), Sheamus performed 10 Beats of the Bodhran on Miz. Gargano then performed a superkick on Miz, followed by Sheamus performing a Brogue Kick on Miz to eliminate him. Kofi Kingston (#4) and Xavier Woods (#6) double-teamed the other competitors in the match, after which, Woods teased taking on Kingston only to play to the crowd instead. Drew McIntyre (#9) dominated the other competitors and performed a Claymore Kick on Karrion Kross (#7) to eliminate him. After Gunther eliminated Woods, Gunther sent Kingston over the top ring rope and knocked him off onto a commentator chair at ringside, thus Kingston was eliminated. Brock Lesnar entered at No. 12 and performed German suplexes on McIntyre, Sheamus and Dawkins. Lesnar then eliminated Santos Escobar (#10), Angelo Dawkins (#11), and Chad Gable (#8). As Lesnar and Gunther stared each other down, Bobby Lashley entered at No. 13, performed a spear on Lesnar, McIntyre and Sheamus, and a powerslam on Gargano and Gunther. Lesnar attempted an F-5 on Lashley, only for Lashley to eliminate him. An enraged Lesnar threw the announce table cover into the ring and threw a tantrum at ringside, after which, he attacked No. 14 entrant Baron Corbin with an F-5 during Corbin's entrance. Lesnar then tossed a referee over the ring barricade before leaving the ring. As Corbin did not officially enter the match due to getting attacked by Lesnar earlier, No. 15 entrant Seth "Freakin" Rollins threw Corbin into the ring, performed a superkick on Corbin and eliminated him. No. 16 entrant Otis dominated everyone else. Rey Mysterio was supposed to enter at No. 17, however, he did not come out due to a presumed attack by his son, Dominik Mysterio, who entered at No. 18 while wearing Rey's mask. During Dominik's entrance, Sheamus eliminated Otis. Instead of entering the ring, Dominik showboated at ringside while Sheamus tried to taunt him. Dominik eventually entered the match and tried to eliminate Sheamus, however, Sheamus countered. Elias entered at 19th, wielding a guitar, and smashed it over Gunther's back. McIntyre and Sheamus performed a Claymore Kick and Brogue Kick simultaneously on Elias, after which, both eliminated Elias. Finn Bálor entered at No. 20 and teamed up with his fellow Judgment Day teammate, Dominik, to eliminate Gargano. NXT commentator and WWE Hall of Famer Booker T entered at No. 21 as a surprise entrant and attacked Bàlor and Dominik, after which, he performed the Spin-a-roonie to appease the crowd, however, he was quickly eliminated by Gunther. The last member of Judgement Day, Damian Priest, entered at No. 22, and the stable then proceeded to dominate the other competitors. Priest eliminated Montez Ford, who entered at No. 23. Edge, in his first appearance since losing to Bálor at the 2022 Extreme Rules, entered No. 24 and performed Spears on Bálor, Priest and Dominik. Edge eliminated Bálor and Priest. As Edge attempted to eliminate Dominik, Priest and Bálor eliminated Edge from the outside, after which, a brawl ensued between Edge and Bálor & Priest at ringside. The brawl spilled to the entrance aisle, just as Austin Theory entered No. 25, until Rhea Ripley came out and attacked Edge. Edge's wife, Beth Phoenix, then appeared and performed a Spear on Ripley. Omos entered No. 26 and dominated the other competitors. Braun Strowman entered at No. 27 and a brawl ensued between Strowman and Omos, after which, Strowman eliminated Omos. Both McIntyre and Sheamus then performed the 10 Beats of the Bodhran on Strowman, however, Gunther then eliminated both McIntyre and Sheamus. Logan Paul, in his first appearance since Crown Jewel in November 2022, entered at No. 29, however, he was quickly outnumbered by the other competitors. The last entrant, Cody Rhodes, then entered the match. Rhodes countered Dominik's Three Amigos and performed Cross Rhodes on Dominik before eliminating him from the match. Gunther performed the Last Symphony on Strowman. Ricochet (#28) and Paul leapt off the top rope and collided with each other. Rhodes eliminated Strowman, after which, Ricochet fought Rhodes off, only to be eliminated by Theory. Shortly afterwards, Gunther broke Rey Mysterio's record for the longest time spent in a traditional Royal Rumble match. Rollins performed a Stomp on Theory followed by Rhodes eliminating Theory. The final four were Rhodes, Gunther, Rollins, and Paul. Rhodes and Rollins both performed Pedigrees on Gunther. After Paul eliminated Rollins, Rhodes performed Cross Rhodes on Paul and eliminated him. In the closing moments, after a long battle between Gunther and Rhodes, Rhodes performed Cross Rhodes on Gunther and clotheslined him out of the ring to win the match and earn himself an Undisputed WWE Universal Championship match at WrestleMania 39. After The Undertaker (2007), John Cena (2008), Triple H (2016) and Brock Lesnar (2022), Rhodes became the fifth person to win the match from the No. 30 position. Additionally, Gunther set a new record for longest time spent in a men's Royal Rumble match at 1:11:40 and the second No. 1 entrant after "Stone Cold" Steve Austin in 1999 to emerge as runner-up.

Next, LA Knight faced Bray Wyatt in the Mountain Dew Pitch Black match. This was an anything goes match done under blacklighting. The blacklighting illuminated body and face paint on Wyatt which presented Wyatt with a demon-like appearance, including red eyes. During the match, Knight leapt off the barricade and performed a splash on Wyatt through the announce table. Wyatt then threw a toolbox into the ring, however, Knight attacked Wyatt. In the end, Knight attacked Wyatt with a kendo stick from the top turnbuckle and then attempted to attack Wyatt again, however, Wyatt performed Sister Abigail on Knight to win the match. After the match, Wyatt put on a demon-esque mask and taunted Knight. Knight escaped and attacked Wyatt with a kendo stick who stalked Knight into the crowd. Wyatt performed the Mandible Claw on Knight atop a raised platform—reminiscent of Wyatt's former Fiend gimmick. Uncle Howdy then appeared and performed an elbow drop off a raised platform onto Knight, which set off a pyro explosion, and the Firefly Fun House characters were seen watching from the raised platform. This was Wyatt's last televised match, as he died on August 24 from a heart attack.

After that, Bianca Belair defended the Raw Women's Championship against Alexa Bliss. In the end, as Bliss attempted Sister Abigail on Belair, Belair countered and performed a Kiss of Death on Bliss to retain the title. After the match, a video package aired with old clips of Bliss from when she was associated with Bray Wyatt, and Uncle Howdy then asked Bliss if she was truly in control of herself.

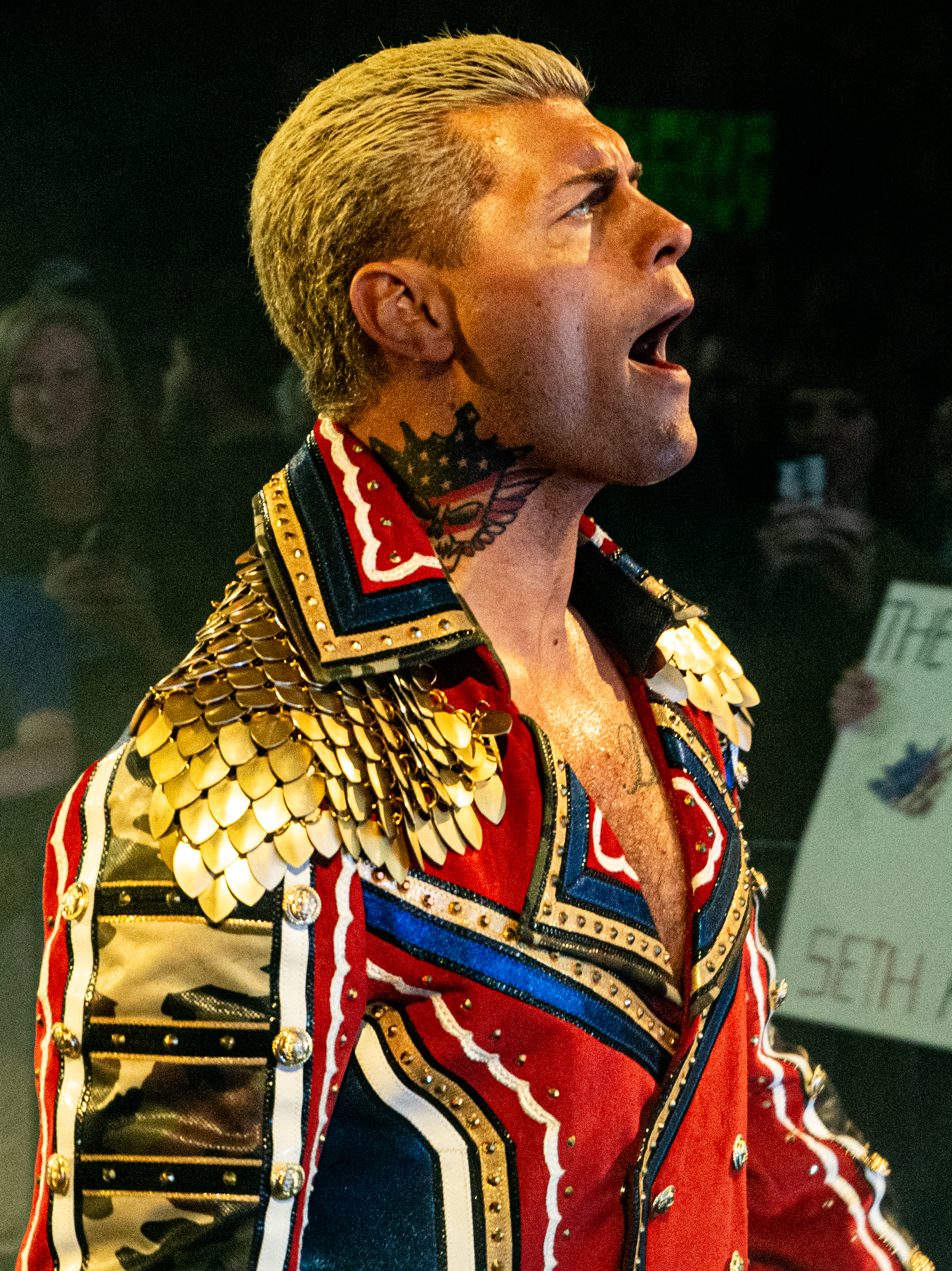
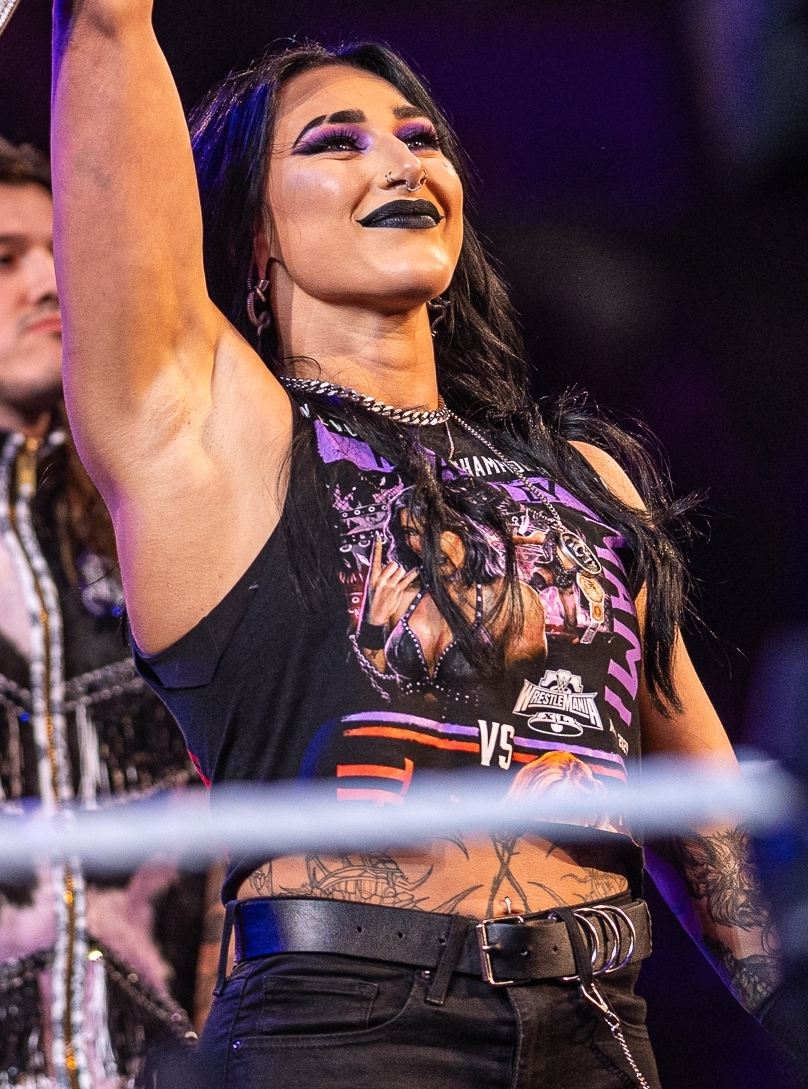
Cody Rhodes and Rhea Ripley, both from Raw, were the respective winners of the men's and women's Royal Rumble matches.

The penultimate match was the women's Royal Rumble match for a women's championship match at WrestleMania 39. Rhea Ripley (#1) and Liv Morgan (#2) began the match. Emma, in her first Royal Rumble match, entered at No. 4 and began to target Ripley. Dana Brooke (#3), Emma, and Morgan tried to eliminate Ripley, however, Ripley fought them off. Bayley then entered the match as entrant No. 6, followed by Hit Row's B-Fab, who entered at No. 7. B-Fab would then be quickly eliminated by Ripley. NXT Women's Champion Roxanne Perez was a surprise entrant at No. 8 and dominated the other competitors. Bayley's Damage CTRL teammates, Dakota Kai (#9) and Iyo Sky (#10), entered the match and all three members of Damage CTRL teamed up to eliminate Brooke. Bayley eliminated Emma followed by Damage CTRL eliminating Perez. A returning Natalya entered at No. 11, and after a brief partnership with her former tag team partner, Shayna Baszler (#5), Natalya turned on Baszler and both started attacking each other. As Natalya and Baszler tried to eliminate each other, Bayley, Kai, and Sky eventually eliminated both. NXT's Zoey Stark entered at No. 13. Sky shoved Candice LeRae (#12) off a turnbuckle to eliminate her. Becky Lynch entered at No. 15 and began to target Damage CTRL, however, Bayley threw Lynch through the second rope and Kai and Sky brawled with Lynch at ringside, eventually sending her over the announce table. Tegan Nox entered at No. 16 and dominated Damage CTRL who reentered the ring as they were not eliminated after brawling with Lynch earlier. Asuka entered at No. 17 and began to target Bayley. Asuka then eliminated Nox. Tamina entered at No. 19 and had a stare down with Piper Niven (previously known as Doudrop, and reverting to the name she used in NXT UK), who entered at No. 18. After Tamina took out Niven, Bayley, Kai and Sky dominated Tamina, however, Lynch returned to the match and targeted Bayley, Kai and Sky. A returning Chelsea Green entered at No. 20 only for Ripley to eliminate her in five seconds, setting the record for shortest time spent in a women's Royal Rumble. After Lynch eliminated Kai and Sky, Bayley eliminated Lynch, however, Bayley was eliminated by Morgan. A second brawl ensued between Lynch and Damage CTRL, which spilled into the crowd. Zelina Vega entered at No. 21, donning cosplay in a cross-promotion with Street Fighter and fought with Xia Li (#14) on the ring apron, eventually eliminating Li. Raquel Rodriguez entered at No. 22 and dominated the other competitors. Lacey Evans entered at No. 24, followed by Michelle McCool entering at No. 25, who was seated in the front row. After McCool eliminated Tamina, NXT's Indi Hartwell entered at No. 26, making a surprise appearance. Sonya Deville entered at No. 27, after which, Deville eliminated Stark. Evans applied a Cobra Clutch on Vega before eliminating her. Shotzi, who recovered from a hand injury in December, entered at No. 28. As Hartwell attempted a springboard, Deville eliminated her. Nikki Cross entered at No. 29 and dominated the other competitors. Nia Jax, in her first WWE appearance since her release in November 2021, entered at No. 30. Ripley performed a Riptide on Jax, after which, all the other wrestlers ganged up on Jax and eliminated her. Rodriguez eliminated Evans and Asuka eliminated Deville. Ripley eliminated McCool, and Yim performed Eat Defeat on Shotzi to eliminate her, after which, Ripley threw Yim at Shotzi to eliminate her. After a battle between Rodriguez and Niven, Rodriguez eliminated Niven. As Rodriguez attempted a Texana Bomb on Ripley, Ripley pulled her over the top rope and eliminated her. The final four were Ripley, Morgan, Cross, and Asuka. Morgan quickly eliminated Cross, and in the closing moments, Asuka spat mist on Morgan, which gave Ripley the chance to eliminate Asuka. Morgan performed a Codebreaker on Ripley, who prevented elimination. Ripley then headscissored Morgan to the floor to win the match and earn herself a women's championship match at WrestleMania 39. This win made Ripley the first woman to win the women's Royal Rumble match from the number one position (and the fourth person overall to do so), and saw her spend the longest time in a women's Rumble match at 1:01:08, beating Bianca Belair's previous record of 57 minutes and 10 seconds, until 2024's event, where Bayley would break Rhea's record and last 1:03:03. Additionally, this was only the fourth time that the first and second entrants lasted the entire match and finished as the final two (last occurring in 1995, 1999, and 2021).

Following this, country music singer Hardy performed his song "Sold Out".

=== Main event ===
In the main event, Roman Reigns (accompanied by Paul Heyman and Sami Zayn) defended the Undisputed WWE Universal Championship against Kevin Owens. During the match, Owens performed a Frog Splash on Reigns for a nearfall. Reigns performed a powerbomb on Owens for a nearfall. Reigns performed a Superman Punch on Owens for a nearfall. As Reigns attempted a spear on Owens, Owens sent Reigns into the ring post and Owens performed a Senton on Reigns for a nearfall. Reigns performed a Spear on Owens for a nearfall. As Reigns attempted another Spear, Owens countered with an attempted stunner, however, Reigns countered and shoved Owens into the referee, incapacitating him. Owens then performed a pop-up powerbomb on Reigns, however, the referee was unable to count the pin. Reigns then performed a low blow on Owens and then instructed Zayn to retrieve a chair. As Reigns was momentarily distracted by Zayn who hesitated in handing the chair to Reigns, Owens performed a Stunner on Reigns for a nearfall. As Owens went for another pop-up powerbomb, Reigns intercepted Owens with a Superman Punch and a second Spear for a nearfall. At ringside, Zayn distracted Owens imploring him to stay down. Reigns then took advantage and performed a Spear on Owens through the barricade. Reigns then slammed Owens' head against the steel steps twice. In the end, Owens slapped Reigns, who responded with a third Spear on Owens to retain the titles.

After the match, the rest of The Bloodline (Jey Uso, Jimmy Uso, and Solo Sikoa) came out. As Jey attempted to adorn Zayn with the tribal garland, Reigns intervened and the Bloodline then delivered a beatdown to Owens, with The Usos and Sikoa doing the damage while Zayn was watching. Heyman handed two pairs of handcuffs to Reigns and The Usos handcuffed both arms of Owens to the ropes. After The Usos viciously attacked Owens with superkicks, Reigns attempted to strike a fallen Owens with a chair, however, Zayn intervened and told Reigns that Owens had enough, and such a savage attack was beneath someone of Reigns' status. Reigns then handed the chair to Zayn, instructing him to strike Owens to prove his loyalty to The Bloodline. Zayn hesitated, and Reigns then began berating Zayn, pointing out how much Reigns and The Bloodline had done for Zayn in elevating his career. A conflicted Zayn then attacked Reigns with the chair, which prompted the entire Bloodline (except Jey, who had taken a liking to Zayn and was emotionally conflicted by what he just witnessed) to beat down Zayn. Jey left the ring and Zayn was removed from the Bloodline, turning Zayn face for the first time since 2017. Reigns, Jimmy, Sikoa, and Heyman headed up the entrance aisle while Owens and Zayn were laid out in the ring as the event came to an end.

== Reception ==
The 2023 Royal Rumble was a financial success for WWE. The company reported that it was the biggest gate in Royal Rumble history, garnering more than US$7.7 million, more than 50% than the previous record set by the 2017 event. It also had a 52% increase in viewership over the previous record set by the 2022 event. Additionally, the 2023 event broke all-time venue merchandise and sponsorship records, with merchandise sales up 135% over the record set in 2022, and sponsorship revenue was up nearly 200% over 2022. Sponsorships included Mountain Dew for the Pitch Black match and Applebee's for the countdown clock. The final segment featuring The Bloodline, particularly between Roman Reigns and Sami Zayn, generated over 20 million views across all of WWE's social media platforms. Dave Meltzer reported the Mountain Dew sponsorship was for 1 million dollars.

WWE reported an attendance of 51,338, though a report by Wrestlenomics said according to a public records request with the City of San Antonio (which operates the Alamodome), the company sold 44,569 tickets for the event, and that the number of tickets scanned and entered was 42,928.

Dave Meltzer gave star ratings for each match of the night. The lowest rated match was Bray Wyatt vs. LA Knight, which received 0.75 stars, the Raw Women's Championship match received 1.5 stars, the Undisputed WWE Universal Championship match and the women's Royal Rumble match both received 3.5 stars, and the men's Royal Rumble match received 4.25 stars, the highest rated match of the night. The Wyatt/LA Knight bout would later 'win' the Worst Match in its 2023 awards listing.

Brent Brookhouse of CBS Sports gave praise to the main event, giving it a grade of A+, stating that "there was so much to dig into in that match". He also stated that the best moment of the aftermath of the match was Jey Uso's walkout, which "established the pecking order of The Bloodline", and also called it "a full circle moment dating back to the group's origins and Jey Uso's feud with Reigns in 2020". Wade Keller of Pro Wrestling Torch gave the match 4 stars out of 5, and that the angle was "phenomenal" with a "perfect crowd response". Brandon LeClair, also from Pro Wrestling Torch, praised Sami Zayn's betrayal of The Bloodline. He said that it was "unbelievable" while also stating that it "certainly leads to that old cliche". LeClair said that "the crowd's reaction to Sami delivering the chair shot to Reigns provides any necessary proof that this has been wildly successful", and "the crowd was nearly as enthralled by an emotional Jey Uso walking out on his family, seemingly siding with Zayn". Chris Mueller of Bleacher Report gave the match itself a grade of B, stating that the match "was a bit too predictable", but gave the post-match grade an A+, stating that this "was what everybody actually came to see".

== Aftermath ==
In April, a new World Heavyweight Championship was introduced, which became exclusive to Raw after the Undisputed WWE Universal Championship became exclusive to SmackDown during the 2023 WWE Draft, giving future men's Royal Rumble winners two choices again. Also during the draft, the Raw Women's Championship and the SmackDown Women's Championship switched brands. In June, to fix the issue of the branded titles being on the opposite brands, the Raw Women's Championship, which was now on SmackDown, reverted to its original name of WWE Women's Championship, and the SmackDown Women's Championship, which was now on Raw, became the Women's World Championship, with both titles receiving new belt designs.

=== Raw ===
Men's Royal Rumble match winner Cody Rhodes opened the following episode of Raw, setting his sights on Roman Reigns and the Undisputed WWE Universal Championship at WrestleMania 39. Afterwards, he was interrupted by The Judgment Day (Damian Priest, Dominik Mysterio, and Finn Bálor). After they mocked Rhodes' Rumble win, Edge appeared and attacked The Judgment Day. A match between Bálor and Rhodes was later scheduled for that episode's main event. During the match, The Judgment Day tried to help Bálor win, but Edge evened the odds, only to be attacked by Rhea Ripley. However, Beth Phoenix took care of Ripley, allowing Rhodes to win the match. The following week, Edge and Phoenix challenged Bálor and Ripley to a mixed tag team match at Elimination Chamber, which Bálor accepted.

Also, on Raw, women's Royal Rumble match winner Rhea Ripley announced that she would challenge Charlotte Flair for the SmackDown Women's Championship at WrestleMania 39. This in turn left the Raw Women's Champion without a WrestleMania opponent. As such, WWE official Adam Pearce announced that at Elimination Chamber, there would be an Elimination Chamber match with three wrestlers from Raw and SmackDown each with the winner earning a Raw Women's Championship match at WrestleMania 39. The four Royal Rumble runners-up were automatically added to the match: Asuka and Nikki Cross from Raw and Raquel Rodriguez and Liv Morgan from SmackDown. Asuka won the match to become the number one contender for the title at WrestleMania 39.

Bayley talked about eliminating Becky Lynch in the women's Royal Rumble match, only for Lynch to interrupt. After the two talked about their history, Lynch challenged Bayley to a Steel Cage match for the following week, but Bayley rejected. However, when Lynch brought Dakota Kai, whose ankle was wrapped around a chair, to the stage and threatened to stomp on the chair, Bayley accepted the challenge. During the match, Bayley was about to win after interference from Damage CTRL (Kai and Iyo Sky), but a returning Lita took out Kai and Sky, and helped Lynch defeat Bayley. Two weeks later, Lita and Lynch challenged Kai and Sky for the WWE Women's Tag Team Championship and defeated them on the February 27 episode to win the titles thanks to a returning Trish Stratus taking out Bayley, who tried interfering. The following week, Stratus, who had retired at SummerSlam in 2019, said she was coming out of retirement so that she, Lynch, and Lita could challenge Damage CTRL to a six-woman tag team match at WrestleMania 39, and Damage CTRL accepted.

On the February 6 episode of Raw, Brock Lesnar appeared with a match contract and challenged Bobby Lashley to another match at Elimination Chamber. Lashley came out and said he would give him an answer later on after reviewing the contract. Lesnar then attacked Lashley with two F-5s. An official contract signing for a match at Elimination Chamber took place the following week, and after Lashley laid out Lesnar, he signed the contract to make the match official.

After the Royal Rumble, Seth "Freakin" Rollins began bad mouthing Logan Paul in interviews, stating that he did not want Paul to be in wrestling. At Elimination Chamber during the titular match, Paul snuck into the chamber and attacked Rollins, costing him the United States Championship. During the February 27 episode of Raw, Rollins called out Paul to meet him face-to-face on the following episode, and Paul accepted. There, Rollins wanted to fight, but Paul said he would not fight for free and hinted that they could fight at WrestleMania 39. WrestleMania host The Miz said he could make the match official, and it was later confirmed.

=== SmackDown ===
On the following episode of SmackDown, Undisputed WWE Universal Champion Roman Reigns (with Paul Heyman) talked about Sami Zayn's contributions to The Bloodline, but thought he saw greed in Zayn. Reigns then stated that Zayn used his island of relevancy. Afterwards, Zayn attacked Reigns from behind, and performed his own Spear on Reigns, only for Reigns to retreat. Zayn then challenged Reigns for the Undisputed WWE Universal Championship, but was attacked by Jimmy Uso and Solo Sikoa (Jey Uso was absent for the episode). Reigns prevented Sikoa from doing further damage to Zayn, and accepted Zayn's challenge, stating that since Zayn hurt his family, he would hurt Zayn in front of his own family in Montreal at Elimination Chamber. After Reigns retained against Zayn, Kevin Owens prevented The Bloodline (except Jey) from doing further damage to Zayn. After more weeks of feuding, including Jey turning on Zayn, Owens saved Zayn from an attack by The Usos on the March 17 episode of SmackDown, and the two embraced. It was then confirmed that Owens and Zayn would face The Usos for the Undisputed WWE Tag Team Championship at WrestleMania 39.

With women's Royal Rumble match winner Rhea Ripley choosing to challenge for the SmackDown Women's Championship, The Judgment Day (Ripley, Damian Priest, Dominik Mysterio, and Finn Bálor) began appearing on SmackDown, thus Dominik began tormenting his dad, Rey, again. After weeks of Rey refusing to attack Dominik, on the March 24 episode of SmackDown, Dominik disrespected his mother and sister, forcing Rey to intervene and hit Dominik. It was then confirmed that Rey and Dominik would face each other at WrestleMania 39. During this time, Ripley and Liv Morgan had a match on the March 3 episode, where Ripley was victorious.

After the Royal Rumble, Bray Wyatt was to begin a WrestleMania program with Bobby Lashley. However, these plans were dropped as he was taken off television in late February due to an undisclosed illness. On August 19, it was reported that the illness was life-threatening, but he was making positive progress towards a return. However, just five days later on August 24, Wyatt unexpectedly died of a heart attack. It was also revealed that the illness was COVID-19, which had exacerbated an existing heart issue. The 2023 Royal Rumble would in turn be his final televised match. His final overall match was at a WWE Live event on February 26, where he defeated LA Knight in a rematch.

== Results ==
No.	Results	Stipulations	Times
1	Cody Rhodes won by last eliminating Gunther	30-man Royal Rumble match for an Undisputed WWE Universal Championship match at WrestleMania 39	1:11:40 (Note: WWE lists the men's Royal Rumble match as lasting 1:11:40, although Pro Wrestling Dot Net lists the match as being 1:11:42.)
2	Bray Wyatt defeated LA Knight by pinfall	Mountain Dew Pitch Black match (Note: This was an anything goes match done under blacklighting.)	5:05
3	Bianca Belair (c) defeated Alexa Bliss by pinfall	Singles match for the WWE Raw Women's Championship	7:35
4	Rhea Ripley won by last eliminating Liv Morgan	30-woman Royal Rumble match for a world championship match at WrestleMania 39	1:01:08 (Note: WWE lists the women's Royal Rumble match as lasting 1:01:08, although Pro Wrestling Dot Net lists the match as being 1:01:03.)
5	Roman Reigns (c) (with Paul Heyman and Sami Zayn) defeated Kevin Owens by pinfall	Singles match for the Undisputed WWE Universal Championship (Note: The name "Undisputed WWE Universal Championship" referred to both the WWE Championship and Universal Championship being held and defended together, although both titles remained independently active.)	19:15
(c) / – the champion(s) heading into the match

=== Men's Royal Rumble match entrances and eliminations ===
– Raw
– SmackDown
– NXT
– Hall of Famer (HOF)
– Unaffiliated
– Winner

Draw	Entrant	Brand/Status	Order	Eliminated by	Time	Elimination(s)
1	Gunther	SmackDown	29	Cody Rhodes	1:11:40 (Note: Gunther set a new record for longest time spent in a traditional 30-man Royal Rumble match at 1:11:40.)	5
2	Sheamus	SmackDown	21	Gunther	52:33	3
3	The Miz	Raw	1	Sheamus	04:23	0
4	Kofi Kingston	SmackDown	4	Gunther	14:51	0
5	Johnny Gargano	Raw	14	Dominik Mysterio and Finn Bálor	29:57	0
6	Xavier Woods	SmackDown	3	Gunther	10:29	0
7	Karrion Kross	SmackDown	2	Drew McIntyre	04:11	0
8	Chad Gable	Raw	7	Brock Lesnar	08:42	0
9	Drew McIntyre	SmackDown	22	Gunther	39:10	3
10	Santos Escobar	SmackDown	5	Brock Lesnar	04:56	0
11	Angelo Dawkins	Raw	6	Brock Lesnar	02:28	0
12	Brock Lesnar	Unaffiliated	8	Bobby Lashley	02:28	3
13	Bobby Lashley	Raw	11	Seth "Freakin" Rollins	07:14	1
14	Baron Corbin	Raw	9	Seth "Freakin" Rollins	00:07	0
15	Seth "Freakin" Rollins	Raw	27	Logan Paul	37:18	2
16	Otis	Raw	12	Drew McIntyre and Sheamus	03:08	0
17	Rey Mysterio	SmackDown	10	Unable to compete (Note: Rey Mysterio was legitimately injured during a match on SmackDown a day earlier. In storyline, Mysterio was implicitly attacked by either his son, Dominik, or The Judgment Day as a group.)	00:00	0
18	Dominik Mysterio	Raw	23	Cody Rhodes	25:44	1
19	Elias	Raw	13	Drew McIntyre and Sheamus	00:39	0
20	Finn Bálor	Raw	18	Edge	07:45	2
21	Booker T	NXT (HOF)	15	Gunther	00:42	0
22	Damian Priest	Raw	17	Edge	04:03	1
23	Montez Ford	Raw	16	Damian Priest	00:44	0
24	Edge	Raw (HOF)	19	Finn Bálor (Note: Finn Bálor was already eliminated when he eliminated Edge.)	01:04	2
25	Austin Theory	Raw	26	Cody Rhodes	15:39	1
26	Omos	Raw	20	Braun Strowman	02:26	0
27	Braun Strowman	SmackDown	24	Cody Rhodes	11:12	1
28	Ricochet	SmackDown	25	Austin Theory	09:14	0
29	Logan Paul	Unaffiliated	28	Cody Rhodes	10:57	1
30	Cody Rhodes	Raw	—	Winner	15:08	5

=== Women's Royal Rumble match entrances and eliminations ===
– Raw
– SmackDown
– NXT
– Unaffiliated
– Winner

Draw	Entrant	Brand/Status	Order	Eliminated by	Time	Elimination(s)
1	Rhea Ripley	Raw	—	Winner	1:01:08	7
2	Liv Morgan	SmackDown	29	Rhea Ripley	1:01:08	3
3	Dana Brooke	Raw	2	Damage CTRL (Note: Bayley, Dakota Kai, and Iyo Sky comprise a group known as Damage CTRL, and the three collectively scored the elimination.)	11:43	0
4	Emma	SmackDown	3	Dakota Kai	10:12	0
5	Shayna Baszler	SmackDown	6	Damage CTRL	13:28	0
6	Bayley	Raw	13	Liv Morgan	27:09	5
7	B-Fab	SmackDown	1	Rhea Ripley	00:36	0
8	Roxanne Perez	NXT	4	Damage CTRL	04:34	0
9	Dakota Kai	Raw	10	Becky Lynch	22:20	5
10	Iyo Sky	Raw	11	Becky Lynch	20:49	5
11	Natalya	SmackDown	5	Damage CTRL	03:08	0
12	Candice LeRae	Raw	7	Iyo Sky	05:11	0
13	Zoey Stark	NXT	16	Sonya Deville	26:34	0
14	Xia Li	SmackDown	14	Zelina Vega	15:30	0
15	Becky Lynch	Raw	12	Bayley	10:45	2
16	Tegan Nox	SmackDown	8	Asuka	03:41	0
17	Asuka	Raw	28	Rhea Ripley	33:15	3
18	Piper Niven	Raw	25	Raquel Rodriguez	28:05	2
19	Tamina	Raw	15	Michelle McCool	11:58	0
20	Chelsea Green	Unaffiliated	9	Rhea Ripley	00:05	0
21	Zelina Vega	SmackDown	17	Lacey Evans	11:30	1
22	Raquel Rodriguez	SmackDown	26	Rhea Ripley	20:40	3
23	Mia Yim	Raw	24	Piper Niven	17:44	2
24	Lacey Evans	SmackDown	20	Raquel Rodriguez	14:05	2
25	Michelle McCool	Unaffiliated	22	Rhea Ripley	13:53	2
26	Indi Hartwell	NXT	18	Sonya Deville	04:51	0
27	Sonya Deville	SmackDown	21	Asuka	10:17	3
28	Shotzi	SmackDown	23	Mia Yim	08:39	1
29	Nikki Cross	Raw	27	Liv Morgan	09:16	1
30	Nia Jax	Unaffiliated	19	11 women (Note: 11 women combined to eliminate Nia Jax – Asuka, Lacey Evans, Liv Morgan, Mia Yim, Michelle McCool, Nikki Cross, Piper Niven, Raquel Rodriguez, Rhea Ripley, Shotzi, and Sonya Deville.)	01:57	0
