= WWE 2K23 =

2023 professional wrestling video game

- Standard edition cover featuring John Cena
- Developer: Visual Concepts
- Publisher: 2K
- Series: WWE 2K
- Platforms: PlayStation 4; PlayStation 5; Windows; Xbox One; Xbox Series X/S
- Release: March 14, 2023
- Genre: Sports
- Modes: Single-player, multiplayer

WWE 2K23 is a 2023 professional wrestling sports video game developed by Visual Concepts and published by 2K. It is the twenty-third overall installment of the video game series based on WWE, the ninth game under the WWE 2K banner, and the successor to WWE 2K22. It was released on March 14, 2023, for PlayStation 4, PlayStation 5, Windows, Xbox One, and Xbox Series X/S.

WWE 2K23 received generally favorable reviews upon release, and it is the highest-rated professional wrestling video game since WWE '13. The follow-up title, WWE 2K24, was released on March 8, 2024. The online servers for WWE 2K23 were shut down on January 6, 2025.

== Gameplay ==
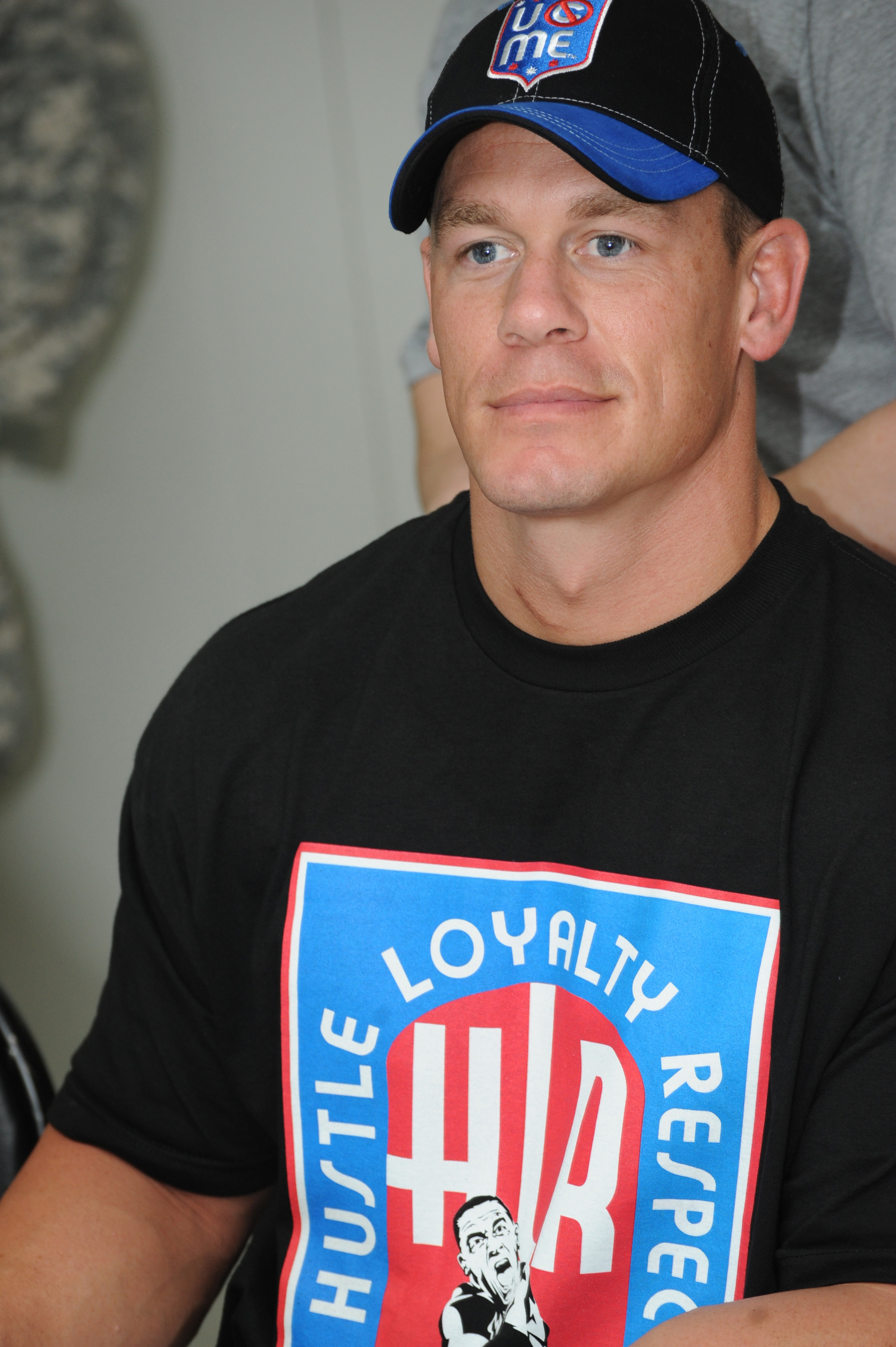
John Cena stars in all three versions of the cover.

Like its predecessor, WWE 2K23 features arcade and simulation wrestling gameplay. WarGames is featured for the first time in a WWE 2K game, and the Royal Rumble match now supports online multiplayer with up to eight players. Referee voiceovers have been revamped with different voices and unique lines when the pinfall occurs.

Game modes such as MyFACTION, MyGM, Showcase, Universe, career mode MyRISE and a full creation suite return with new features. Showcase features cover star John Cena and allows players to recreate key moments in Cena's career.

MyGM was revamped to feature four-player gameplay, five new GMs (Xavier Woods, Tyler Breeze, Kurt Angle, Eric Bischoff and Mick Foley), two new brands (NXT 2.0, which served as a replacement to NXT UK, and WCW), mid-card championships, the Slammy Awards, which occurs at the end of a 25-week season, and a new main goal of acquiring 10 Hall of Fame trophies across multiple seasons, which can be acquired by completing seasonal and lifetime objectives, in order to be inducted to the WWE Hall of Fame, in which, after a season ends, have an option to continue and start another season or retire and end a MyGM campaign.

MyRISE features two distinct storylines: "The Lock" and "The Legacy". The Lock follows a male wrestler making his debut on the WWE main roster. The Legacy follows a female second-generation wrestler rising through the ranks, aided by her aunt's rival, Molly Holly.

== Development ==
According to Creative Director Lynell Jinks, the WarGames match type began development prior to WWE 2K22, and was made possible by the reworked engine following the failure of WWE 2K20.

Developer Andrea Listenberger told Fightful that the two storylines in MyRISE were written by former WWE writers.

On February 15, 2023, 2K released entrance footage of returning character Lita, which caused controversy on social media. Fans were critical of Lita's character model, citing a perceived lack of quality and the reuse of an attire which had been used from WWE 2K16 in 2015 to WWE 2K20 in 2019. Lita's model received alterations to the face prior to the release of the game. Lita '06 became a playable character as an answer to the criticism for the base model; an alternative attire is also available.

=== Roster ===
WWE 2K23 features 246 superstars. It is the first title in the WWE 2K series to assign different attires to a single slot, namely for Roman Reigns, AJ Styles, Lita and certain Cena models.

== Release ==
On January 23, 2023, WWE 2K23 was officially announced with John Cena as the cover star. Bad Bunny was also announced as a playable character for players that pre-order the game, or purchase the Deluxe or Icon editions. The Bad Bunny edition was released on October 23, 2023, which includes all of the Icon Edition contents, as well as Bad Bunny's Backlash 2023 attire, a Bad Bunny EVO MyFaction card, the Puerto Rican-themed LWO shirt, Bad Bunny-themed MyFaction customization items and 65,700 VC. A similar bundle, which included the base game and both Bad Bunny packs, was released on October 18, 2023.

On January 30, 2K released behind-the-scenes footage of Cody Rhodes being scanned, who makes his first appearance under his real name since the 2014 game WWE 2K15 following his return at WrestleMania 38, now under his nickname, "The American Nightmare".

The Deluxe Edition includes a season pass for future downloadable content, MyFACTION bonuses, and three days of early access on March 14. The Icon Edition features all Deluxe Edition content, as well as the "Ruthless Aggression Pack" which contains: classic OVW versions of Cena, Randy Orton, Brock Lesnar and Batista, the WrestleMania 22 arena, additional MyFACTION bonuses, and the John Cena Legacy Championship.

On March 6, 2023, the downloadable content for the game was announced. Five content packs containing 24 playable characters these were released from April to August, including superstars from Raw, SmackDown, NXT and Legends. These characters include: Bray Wyatt, Wade Barrett, Eve Torres, Zeus, Harley Race, the Steiner Brothers, Pretty Deadly and Hit Row among others.

== Reception ==
Reception

Aggregate scores
Aggregator	Score
Metacritic	(PC) 79/100 (PS5) 82/100 (XBXS) 81/100
OpenCritic	83% recommended (Note: Based on 96 critic reviews.)

Review scores
Publication	Score
Destructoid	7.5/10
Digital Trends	3.5/5 stars
Game Informer	8/10
GameSpot	8/10
GamesRadar+	4/5 stars
Hardcore Gamer	4.5/5
IGN	8/10
NME	4/5 stars
Push Square	8/10 stars
Shacknews	8/10
TouchArcade	4/5 stars
VideoGamer.com	8/10

WWE 2K23 received "generally favorable reviews" according to review aggregator Metacritic. On OpenCritic, the game received a "strong" rating according to 83 percent of critics' recommendations.

In a preview of the game, Dale Driver from IGN observed that the game largely felt the same as its predecessor with a few improvements. IGN noted greater flexibility and creativity in the game compared to its predecessors.

=== Awards and nominations ===
Year	Ceremony	Category	Result	Ref.
2024	27th Annual D.I.C.E. Awards	Sports Game of the Year	Nominated	
