= Riot City Wrestling =

Independent professional wrestling promoter

- Current Riot City Wrestling logo
- Acronym: RCW
- Founded: January 2006; 20 years ago
- Style: Professional wrestling Lucha libre Strong style
- Headquarters: Adelaide, South Australia
- Website: http://riotcitywrestling.com.au/

Riot City Wrestling (RCW) is an Australian independent professional wrestling promotion founded in January 2006 in Adelaide, South Australia. It runs shows independently, in conjunction with local festivals, as well as with other organizations and wrestling promotions.

== History ==
Riot City Wrestling was founded in Adelaide in January 2006. In 2010, RCW appeared at the Adelaide Fringe, hosting the STRENGTH Cup tournament, and was voted one of the festival's top five attractions by the Adelaide Advertiser. They returned to the festival in 2011, hosting the tournament again. For the 2014 festival, the company promoted a lucha libre-themed show.

On 1 July 2012, the Goodwood Saints Football Club of the South Australian Amateur Football League hosted RCW for a special fundraiser. RCW wrestlers the Basso Boys, who competed at the event, had previously played C Grade Australian Rules Football. As of August 2014, Jeff Jarrett's American-based Global Force Wrestling announced working agreements with Riot City Wrestling. That month, during a WWE tour of Australia, several RCW wrestlers were also invited to participate in a WWE training camp.

Wrestling reviewer Rod Lewis has noted the promotion for its "high octane acrobatics" as well as "the comical theatrics and surprising plot twists". RCW has built an alliance with Melbourne City Wrestling, which has featured a rivalry between wrestlers from the two promotions.

RCW runs a training academy, which is located in Kilkenny. Wrestlers who have competed for RCW include former AEW World Trios Champion Buddy Murphy, Voodoo, who competes for Grand Pro Wrestling, and current WWE superstars Rhea Ripley and Zaria.

== Championships and accomplishments ==
Championship	Current champion(s)	Reign	Date won	Days held	Location	Notes	Ref.
RCW Grand Championship	Banjo Powers	1	22 August 2026	86	Adelaide, South Australia, Australia	Defeated previous champion Dean Brady at Heavy is the Crown.	
RCW Emerald Crown	Matt Hayter	1	12 July 2026	127	Adelaide, South Australia, Australia	Defeated previous champion Ben Braxton at Riot City Rumble. This was a Four Way Match that also included KIT and SMASH	
RCW Tag Team Championship	Cadie Tre and Layla Paige	1	22 August 2026	86	Adelaide, South Australia, Australia	Defeated previous champions CBTM (SNAXX and Vincent Di Maria) at Heavy is the Crown.	

== Alumni ==
- Demi Bennett
- DELTA
- Elliot Sexton
- Indi Hartwell
- Jessie McKay
- Jonah Rock
- KC Cassidy
- Matt Silva
- Matty Wahlberg
- Toni Storm

== See also ==
- Professional wrestling in Australia
- List of professional wrestling organisations in Australia
