= Adam Brooks (professional wrestler) =

Australian professional wrestler

- Brooks in 2026

Personal information
- Born: Adam Wilmot; 13 August 1991 (age 35) Melbourne, Victoria, Australia

Professional wrestling career
- Ring name: Adam Brooks
- Billed height: 5 ft 11 in (180 cm)
- Billed weight: 176 lb (80 kg)
- Billed from: Melbourne, Australia
- Trained by: Buddy Matthews
- Debut: February 2010

Adam Wilmot (born 13 August 1991), better known by his ring name Adam Brooks, is an Australian professional wrestler. He performs primarily on the Australian independent circuit and is best known for his work with Melbourne City Wrestling (MCW), where he has won the MCW World Heavyweight Championship, MCW Intercommonwealth Championship and MCW Tag Team Championship.

Brooks has also competed internationally for promotions including All Elite Wrestling (AEW), Ring of Honor (ROH), Total Nonstop Action Wrestling (TNA), Consejo Mundial de Lucha Libre (CMLL), Major League Wrestling (MLW), Pro Wrestling Guerrilla (PWG),Pro Wrestling Noah, PROGRESS Wrestling, Revolution Pro Wrestling (RevPro), Defiant Wrestling, Dragongate, Over The Top Wrestling (OTT), and House of Hardcore.

== Early life ==
Adam Wilmot was born on 13 August 1991 in Melbourne, Victoria, Australia. He grew up in Dingley Village, a suburb in southeastern Melbourne, Victoria. As a child, his original ambition was to play Australian football for the Richmond Football Club, with Richmond player Nick Daffy being one of his sporting idols.

At around the age of 11, he was introduced to professional wrestling after a neighbour invited him to watch a VHS tape of WrestleMania 2000. The tape was playing the Triangle ladder match between The Hardy Boyz, The Dudley Boyz, and Edge and Christian. He was particularly impressed by Jeff Hardy, whose performance inspired him to become interested in professional wrestling.

== Professional wrestling career ==
=== Independent circuit (2010–present) ===
Wilmot made his unofficial debut on 8 September 2007 as Adam Brooks, at Professional Championship Wrestling (PCW), where he teamed with Diaz in a losing effort to his mentor Matt Silva and Jacko Lantern. Brooks made his official debut in February 2010.

Brooks initially worked for Australian independent promotions before becoming a regular performer for Melbourne City Wrestling (MCW). He quickly established himself as one of the prominent wrestlers on the Australian independent circuit, winning several championships throughout the early part of his career. Brooks became one of the most prominent wrestlers in MCW. He won the MCW Tag Team Championship three times alongside Dowie James and later won the MCW Intercommonwealth Championship on multiple occasions.

On 9 November 2019, Brooks defeated Slex and Dowie James in a three-way elimination match to win the MCW World Heavyweight Championship. Brooks later returned to MCW and continued competing for the promotion's major championships. He became a five-time MCW Intercommonwealth Champion, with his fifth reign beginning after defeating Robbie Thorpe. During his fifth reign, Brooks successfully defended the championship against a number of wrestlers, including Ryan Rapid, Lucky O'Leary, Liam Fury, The Tuckman, Robbie Thorpe, Ricky South and Certified Papi. The defenses took place across Australia and New Zealand.

Brooks began competing internationally during the late 2010s, wrestling in the United States, United Kingdom, Japan, Europe and Mexico. His international opponents have included Austin Aries, Will Ospreay, Matt Taven, Marty Scurll, Dragon Lee, Bandido, Mark Haskins and Brody King. Brooks has competed for numerous international and independent promotions throughout his career, including Major League Wrestling (MLW), Consejo Mundial de Lucha Libre (CMLL), Pro Wrestling Guerrilla (PWG), PROGRESS Wrestling, Revolution Pro Wrestling (RevPro), Defiant Wrestling, Over The Top Wrestling (OTT), Dragongate, and House of Hardcore.

=== Ring of Honor (2018, 2020) ===
In 2018, Brooks made his first appearance for Ring of Honor (ROH) in a Proving Ground match against then-ROH World Champion Jay Lethal in a losing effort.

On 7 February 2020, Ring of Honor announced that Brooks had signed with the promotion. ROH subsequently announced that Brooks would make his official debut against fellow Australian wrestler Slex at the company's 18th Anniversary event. However, the COVID-19 pandemic affected ROH's scheduled events and Brooks never wrestled for the promotion as a signed talent.

=== Pro Wrestling Noah (2023) ===
On 9 July 2023, Brooks made his debut for Pro Wrestling Noah, teaming with Ninja Mack to defeat Dante Leon and Stallion Rogers. From August to September, Brooks competed in the N-1 Victory as part of A-Block and finished with 4 points that included a win over former GHC Heavyweight Champion Kenoh.

=== Total Nonstop Action Wrestling (2026) ===
Brooks made his debut for Total Nonstop Action Wrestling (TNA) on 20 February 2026 of Xplosion, losing to The Home Town Man. On the 30 April episode of Impact!, Brooks unsuccessfully challenged Mustafa Ali for the TNA International Championship.

=== All Elite Wrestling / Return to ROH (2026–present) ===
Brooks made his All Elite Wrestling (AEW) debut on the 18 July 2026 episode of AEW Collision, where he was defeated by Will Ospreay. On 23 July, Brooks made his ROH return on ROH on HonorClub, defeating Nathan Cruz. At the Zero Hour pre-show of Death Before Dishonor on 21 August, Brooks was defeated by El Phantasmo.

== Professional wrestling style and persona ==
Brooks is primarily known for a technical and high-flying wrestling style. He has used the nicknames "The G.L.O.A.T.", "The Loose Ledge" and "Brooksy" during his career.

Brooks cites Jeff Hardy as one of his inspirations.

== Personal life ==
Wilmot is close friends with fellow wrestlers Matthew Adams (known as Buddy Matthews or Buddy Murphy) and Will Ospreay.

== Championships and accomplishments ==
- Adelaide Championship Wrestling
  - ACW Heavyweight Championship (1 time)
- Future Wrestling Australia
  - FWA Jupiter Championship (1 time)
- Melbourne City Wrestling
  - MCW World Heavyweight Championship (1 time)
  - MCW Intercommonwealth Championship (5 times)
  - MCW Tag Team Championship (4 times) – with Dowie James (3) and Rocky Menero (1)
  - Ballroom Brawl (2019)
  - MCW Triple Crown – fifth winner
- Nightfall Wrestling Alliance
  - Nightfall Heavyweight Championship (1 time)
- Oceania Pro Wrestling
  - OPW Heavyweight Championship (1 time, inaugural)
- Outback Championship Wrestling
  - OCW Tag Team Championship (1 time) – with KrackerJak
- Pro Wrestling Australia
  - PWA Heavyweight Championship (1 time)
- Pro Wrestling Illustrated
  - Ranked No. 127 of the top 500 singles wrestlers in the PWI 500 in 2026
- Riot City Wrestling
  - RCW Championship (1 time)
- Southern Territory Wrestling
  - STW Championship (1 time)
- SUPLEX Pro Wrestling
  - SUPLEX Junior Heavyweight Championship (1 time)
- Warzone Wrestling
  - Warzone Heavyweight Championship (2 times)
- Without A Cause
  - Verified Championship (1 time)
