= Robbie Eagles =

Australian professional wrestler

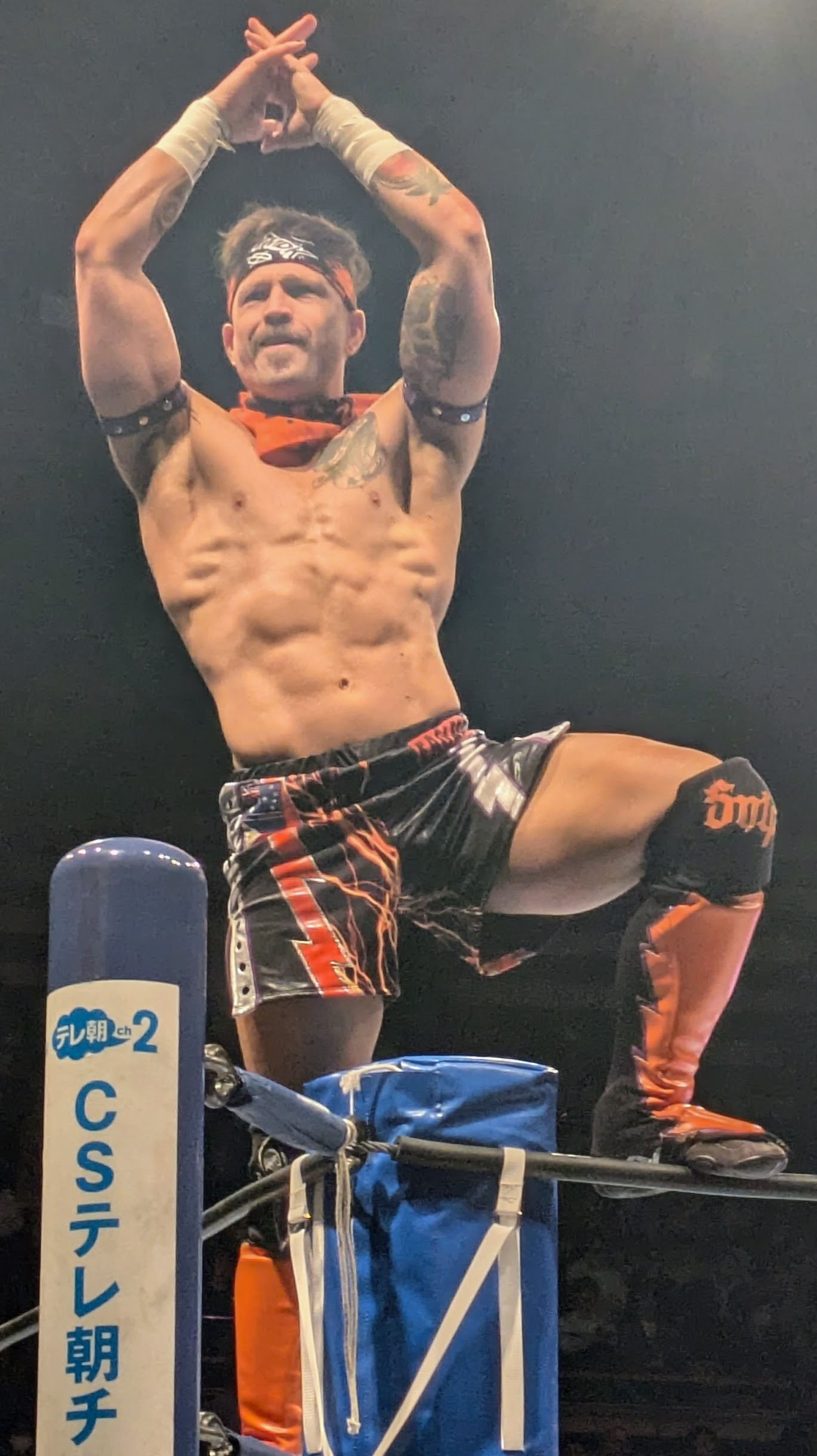
- Eagles in January 2026

Personal information
- Born: James McMath; 13 February 1990 (age 36) New South Wales, Australia

Professional wrestling career
- Ring name(s): Robby Eagle; Caballero Jaguar; Robbie Eagles
- Billed height: 5 ft 10 in (177 cm)
- Billed weight: 176 lb (80 kg)
- Billed from: Jonestown, New South Wales, Australia
- Trained by: Eagles Wrestling Academy; Ryan Eagles; Madison Eagles
- Debut: March 2008

James McMath (born 13 February 1990), better known by his ring name Robbie Eagles (ロビー・イーグルス, Robī Īgurusu), is an Australian professional wrestler. He is signed to New Japan Pro-Wrestling (NJPW), where he is a member of The Mighty Don't Kneel. He also makes appearances for All Elite Wrestling (AEW), Ring of Honor (ROH), and on the independent circuit.

Eagles started wrestling on the Australian independent scene, for companies like Professional Wrestling Alliance, Melbourne City Wrestling and World Series Wrestling. Eagles has also gained prominence in other countries wrestling for companies such as Chikara, Progress and Pro Wrestling Guerrilla.

== Professional wrestling career ==
=== Independent circuit (2008–present) ===
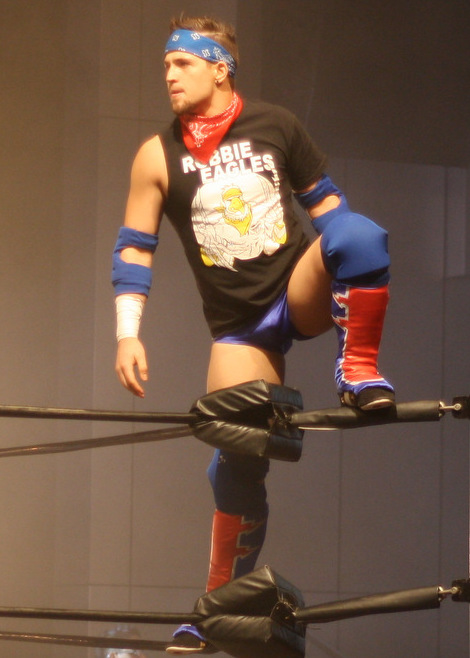
Eagles in July 2013, performing for PWA

Robbie Eagles made his professional wrestling debut in March 2008 for Australian promotion Professional Wrestling Alliance. In November 2008, Eagles defeated Rick Sterling and Troy The Boy to become the PWA A1GP champion for his first time. In February 2009, Eagles and KC Cassidy defeated Mike Valuable and Madison Eagles. In May 2009, Eagles defended his A1GP championship against his brother, Ryan, to a 30-minute time limit draw. Eagles successfully defended his title against Matt Silva. In October 2009, Eagles was defeated by William Kidd, losing the A1GP championship. In 2010, Eagles was defeated by Damian Slater. In 2018, at a PWA and Progress joint show, Eagles was defeated by Travis Banks. In 2018, Eagles lost his PWA heavyweight championship to Jonah Rock.

In 2010, Eagles made his Melbourne City Wrestling debut as part of PWA Invades MCW, where he represented PWA. In Eagles' second MCW match he defeated Ryan Rollins. Eagles and Adam Brooks defeated TMDK in the quarter final round of the MCW Tag Team Title Tournament in 2012 before being eliminated by Hard Way Inc.

In 2011, Eagles made his Chikara debut taking part in the Young Lions Cup. In 2012, Eagles made his Pro Wrestling Zero1 debut as "Robby Eagle". In his debut, Eagles and Marcus Bean defeated Craig Classic and Yoshikazu Yokoyama. In June, Eagle and Ikuto Hidaka defeated Bean and Classic. On 1 July, now going under his original ring name, Eagles and Hidaka defeated Jonathan Gresham and Classic. On 20 July, Eagles, Gresham and Hikada defeated Mineo Fujita, Takuya Sugawara and Jonny Vandal. An Australian of Filipino descent, Eagles has wrestled in the Philippines multiple times, including in 2021 for Philippine Wrestling Revolution, and 2023 for Filipino Pro Wrestling.

=== World Series Wrestling (2017–present) ===
In 2017, Eagles debuted for World Series Wrestling, losing to Zack Sabre Jr. In 2018, Eagles defeated Marty Scurll, Abyss and Jimmy Havoc in a four-way hardcore match. Later that year, Eagles and Johnny Impact defeated Slex and Austin Aries.

=== New Japan Pro-Wrestling (2018–present) ===
==== Bullet Club and Chaos (2018–2023) ====
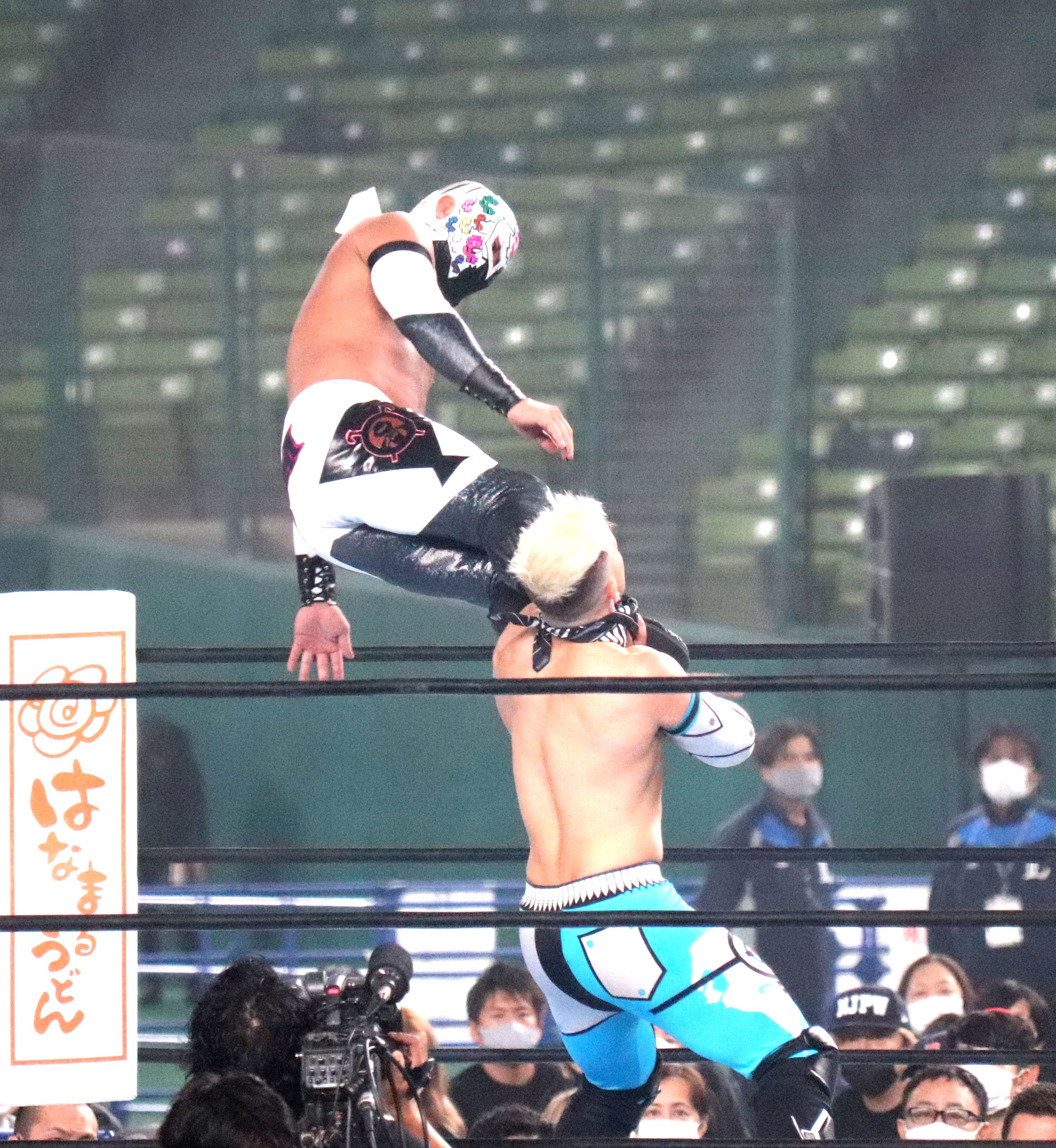
Eagles facing Bushi at Wrestle Grand Slam in MetLife Dome

Eagles made his New Japan Pro-Wrestling debut in 2018 during New Japan's Fallout Down Under tour. On day 2, Eagles and Mick Moretti were defeated by TMDK. On day 3, Eagles and Moretti were defeated by Evil and Sanada of Los Ingobernables de Japón. On day 4, Eagles and Will Ospreay were defeated by Cody. On 8 October 2018, Bad Luck Fale announced that Eagles would be Taiji Ishimori's tag partner in the 2018 Super Jr. Tag Tournament, thus aligning himself with the Bullet Club. Ishimori and Eagles finished the tournament with a result of three wins and four losses.

On 29 June 2019 at Southern Showdown, Eagles was unsuccessful in challenging Ospreay for the IWGP Junior Heavyweight Championship. The following night he turned on Bullet Club leader Jay White, to join Chaos. On 31 August at NJPW Royal Quest, Eagles teamed up with Ospreay as the "Birds Of Prey" to defeat IWGP Junior Heavyweight Tag Team Champions Ishimori and El Phantasmo in a non-title match. On 16 September, Ospreay and Eagles unsuccessfully challenged Ishimori and Phantasmo for the championship at Destruction in Kagoshima. On 25 July 2021, at Wrestle Grand Slam in Tokyo Dome, Eagles defeated El Desperado by submission to win the Junior Heavyweight Championship for the first time in his career. He would then team with Tiger Mask to defeat Desperado and Yoshinobu Kanemaru for their Junior Heavyweight Tag Team Championship on the Road to Power Struggle. Eagles would lose his IWGP Junior Heavyweight Championship back to Desperado at Power Struggle.

==== TMDK (2023–present) ====
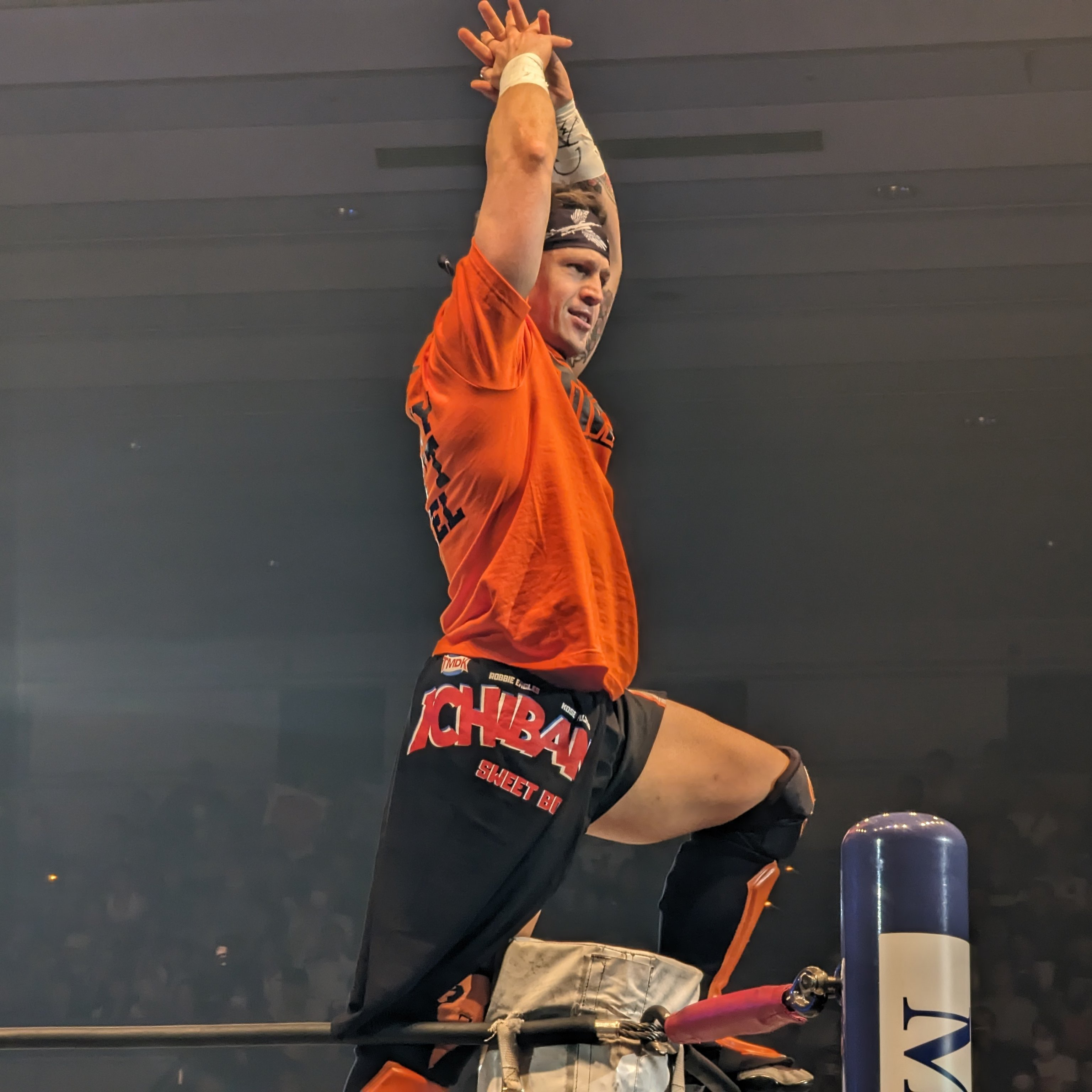
Eagles in November 2023

On 21 March 2023, at the New Japan Cup Finals, Eagles announced that he will challenge Hiromu Takahashi for the IWGP Junior Heavyweight Championship at Sakura Genesis. During the same night he would also be announced as the newest member of TMDK, thus leaving Chaos in the process. At the event on 8 April, Eagles was defeated by Takahashi. The following month, Eagles participated in the 2023 Best of the Super Juniors tournament, competing in the B block. Eagles finished the tournament with 10 points, failing to advance to the semi-finals. On November 4, 2024, at Power Struggle, Eagles and stablemate Kosei Fujita as the "Ichiban Sweet Boys", won the Super Junior Tag League.

On January 4, 2025, at Wrestle Kingdom 19, the Ichiban Sweet Boys won the IWGP Junior Heavyweight Tag Team Championship. On April 29, 2025 at Wrestling Hizen no Kuni, Ichiban Sweetboys lost their titles to YOH and Master Wato.

On January 6, 2026 at New Year Dash!!. Ichiban Sweet Boys won the IWGP Junior Heavyweight Tag Team Championship for the second time in a four-way tag, but lost them two months later to Robbie X and Taiji Ishimori of Unbound Co.. They regained the titles on April 25 at Wrestling RedZone, marking Eagles' fourth reign with the title but lost it again nine days later to El Desperado and Místico at Wrestling Dontaku.

=== Pro Wrestling Guerrilla (2018–2019) ===
Eagles made his debut for Pro Wrestling Guerrilla during All Star Weekend 14, where he and Morgan Webster were defeated by Sammy Guevara. The next night, he was defeated by Joey Janela. At PWG Bask in his Glory, he was defeated by Bandido. He would later enter the 2018 Battle of Los Angeles, where he defeated DJZ in the first round, but lost to Shingo Takagi in the second round. On 18 January 2019, at Hand of Doom, Eagles defeated Jonathan Gresham.

=== All Elite Wrestling / Ring of Honor (2023–present) ===
Due to NJPW's working relationships, Eagles has made appearances for All Elite Wrestling (AEW) and Ring of Honor (ROH) since 2023, challenging for various titles, including the ROH World Championship held by Claudio Castagnoli in 2023, and the AEW TNT Championship held by his former student Kyle Fletcher in 2026.

== Championships and accomplishments ==
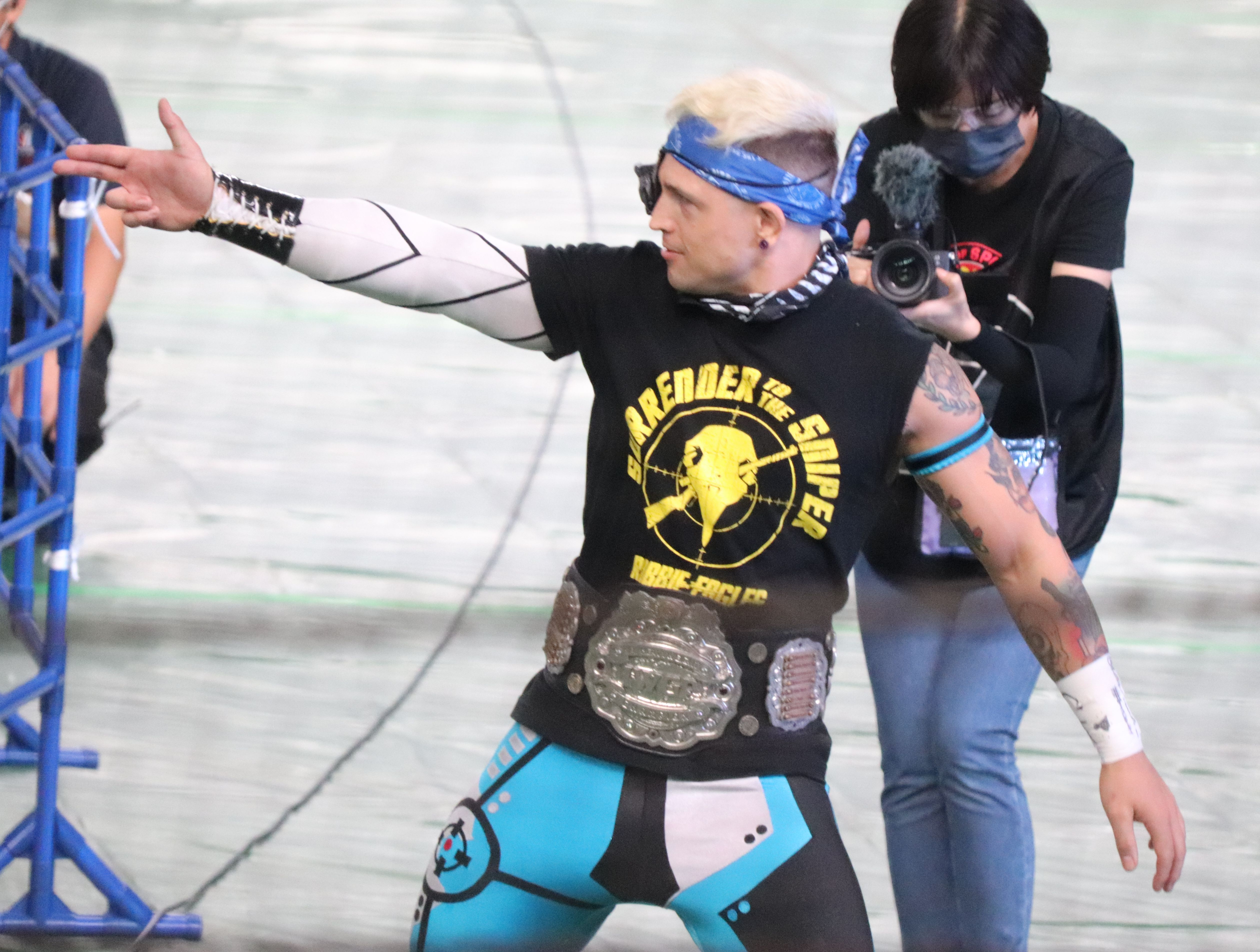
Eagles is a one-time IWGP Junior Heavyweight Champion...

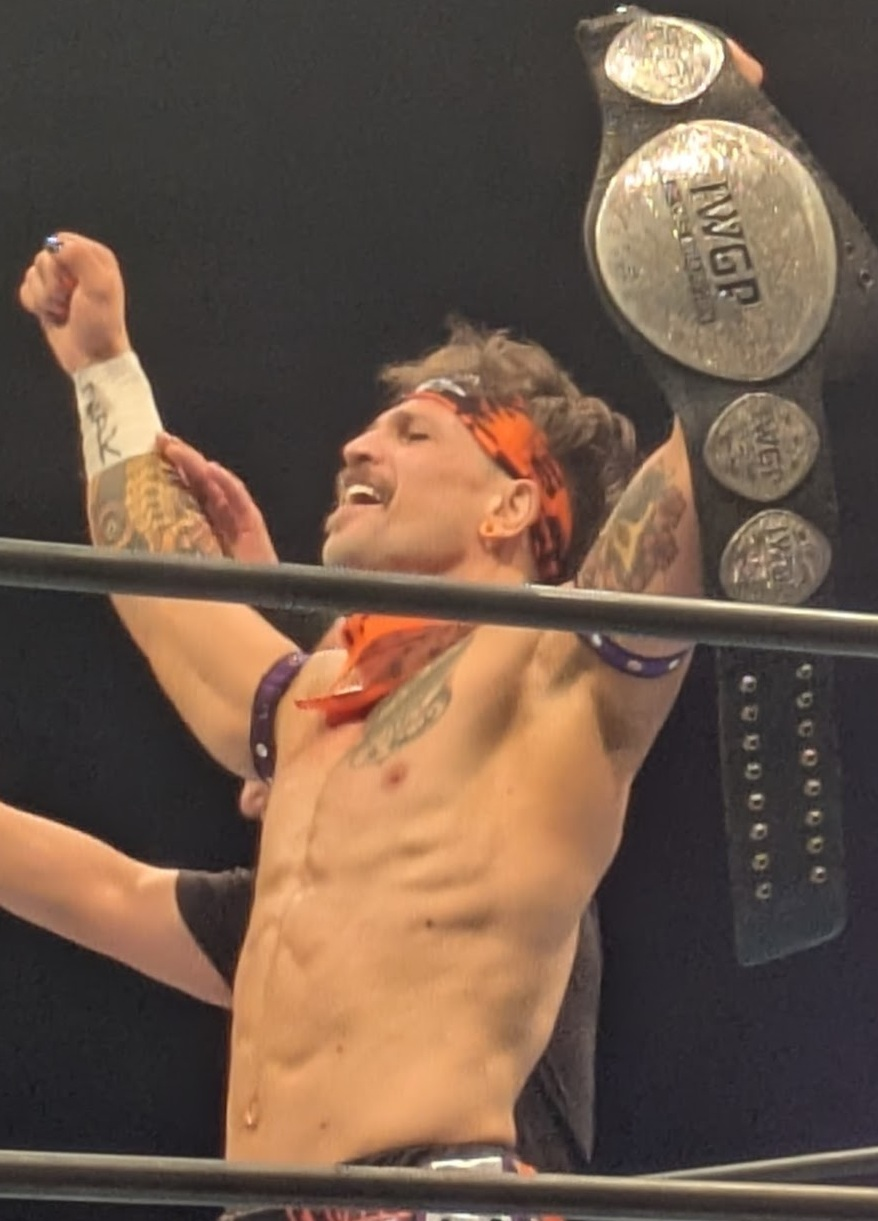
...and a four-time IWGP Junior Heavyweight Tag Team Champion

- 1Fall Entertainment
  - 1Fall Openweight Championship (1 time)
- Blue Mountains Pro Wrestling
  - BMPW Heritage Championship (1 time)
  - BMPW World Heritage Series (1 time)
- Melbourne City Wrestling
  - MCW Intercommonwealth Championship (1 time)
- Newcastle Pro Wrestling
  - Kings Of The Castle winner (1 time) – with Mat Diamond
  - Newy Pro Middleweight Championship (3 times)
- New Japan Pro-Wrestling
  - IWGP Junior Heavyweight Championship (1 time)
  - IWGP Junior Heavyweight Tag Team Championship (4 times) – with Tiger Mask (1) and Kosei Fujita (3)
  - Super Junior Tag League (2024) – with Kosei Fujita
- Professional Wrestling Alliance/Pro Wrestling Australia
  - A1GP Championship
  - King Of The New School 2010 Tag Team Tournament winner (1 time) – with Mat Diamond
  - PWA Heavyweight Championship (3 times)
  - PWA Tag Team Championship (1 time) – with Mat Diamond
  - Soul of PWA Championship (1 time)
- Pro Wrestling Illustrated
  - Ranked No. 169 of the top 500 singles wrestlers in the PWI 500 in 2024
- Rock 'N' Roll Wrestling
  - RRW Heavyweight Championship (1 time)
- World Series Wrestling
  - WSW World Heavyweight Championship (1 time)
