= Zaria (wrestler) =

Australian professional wrestler

Personal information
- Born: Daria Hodder

Professional wrestling career
- Ring name(s): Delta; Delta Brady; Zaria
- Billed from: Adelaide, South Australia

Daria Hodder is an Australian professional wrestler. As of February 2024, she is signed to WWE, where she performs on the NXT brand under the ring name Zaria. She is the current NXT Women's North American Champion in her first reign.

Hodder began on the Australian independent circuit under the ring name Delta, mostly for Riot City Wrestling (RCW) and Melbourne City Wrestling (MCW). She is a former two-time RCW Tag Team Champion with her older brother, Dean Brady, and the final holder of both the RCW Championship and RCW Women's Championship, as well as the first holder of the RCW Grand Championship.

== Professional wrestling career ==
=== Independent circuit (2020–2024) ===
Hodder credits her older brother, fellow Australian wrestler Dean Brady, with sparking her passion to begin professional wrestling after watching him at a Riot City Wrestling (RCW) show. After a successful tryout with RCW, she made her debut under the ring name Delta Brady, on 31 December 2020, teaming with her brother to defeat Cayden Cornell and Savannah Summers. After this, she would since perform under the mononym Delta and began to focus on singles competition in RCW's Women's division, making many unsuccessful attempts at the RCW Women's Championship. After wrestling each other for the first time in July 2021, Brady and Delta would form a tag team, initially called The Bradys, they would later change their name to Brady LTD. Together they would win the RCW Tag Team Championship on two separate occasions. Delta would also win the MCW Women's Championship twice, and would become the first woman to hold the MCW Intercommonwealth Championship. She would then become the first woman to hold the RCW Championship.

On 12 April 2024, Delta challenged Jordynne Grace for the TNA Knockouts Championship at Oceania Pro Wrestling's H.E.R. event. On 18 May 2024, after losing the RCW Grand Championship, Delta announced that she would wrestle her final match in Australia at RCW's Heavy Is The Crown 2024, on 6 July against her brother, Dean Brady, as she would be leaving to wrestle in America following that match.

=== WWE (2024–present) ===
==== Debut and ZaRuca (2024–2026) ====
In February 2024, Hodder took part in the WWE tryouts held in Perth, Western Australia before Elimination Chamber: Perth. On 1 October episode of NXT, a vignette aired showing Hodder walking down a road, looking at road signs for Exit 10 and Route 27, implying her debut on 27 October at NXT Halloween Havoc. Over the weeks, more vignettes were aired. On 22 October episode of NXT, a vignette aired revealing her new ring name as Zaria. She made her debut later that same night following the main event. At NXT Halloween Havoc, she first appeared after Giulia and Stephanie Vaquer defeated NXT Women's Champion Roxanne Perez and Cora Jade, looking over the ring from the crowd. Later that night, Zaria interrupted and attacked the new NXT Women's North American Champion Fallon Henley and her Fatal Influence stablemates Jacy Jayne and Jazmyn Nyx. Zaria made her NXT in-ring debut on 29 October episode of NXT, quickly defeating Brinley Reece. Following the match, Fatal Influence, Jade and Perez surrounded the ring. Before they could attack, Zaria was joined by Giulia, Vaquer, Kelani Jordan and Jordynne Grace. A brawl quickly ensued, setting up a ten-woman tag team match for NXT 2300 on 6 November, where Zaria won the match for her team after pinning Perez. At NXT Deadline on 7 December, Zaria competed in the Iron Survivor Challenge to determine the number one contender for the NXT Women's Championship, which was won by Giulia.

After NXT Deadline, Zaria formed a partnership with fellow Iron Survivor Challenge competitor Sol Ruca, with the pair later colloquially known as ZaRuca. According to Zaria, the pairing was originally meant to be a one-off. The pair won their first tag team match on 4 February 2025 episode of NXT against Tatum Paxley and Gigi Dolin. On 1 April episode of NXT, Zaria defeated Lash Legend to qualify for the six-woman ladder match for the vacant NXT Women's North American Championship at NXT Stand & Deliver on 19 April, where the title was won by Ruca. Zaria made her main roster debut appearance on 11 July episode of SmackDown, where she accompanied Ruca in the latter's fatal four-way match against the other three representatives of the Evolution WWE Women's Tag Team Championship fatal four-way tag team match involving champions The Judgment Day (Raquel Rodriguez and Roxanne Perez), Charlotte Flair and Alexa Bliss, and The Kabuki Warriors (Asuka and Kairi Sane). Two days later at Evolution, ZaRuca failed to win the titles. On 3 October episode of SmackDown, Zaria wrestled her main roster debut match where ZaRuca defeated The Green Regime (Chelsea Green and Alba Fyre). On 17 October episode of SmackDown, ZaRuca unsuccessfully challenged for the WWE Women's Tag Team Championship with Ruca injuring her left knee in the process. On the following episode of NXT, Zaria offered to defend the NXT Women's North American Championship on Ruca's behalf at NXT Halloween Havoc on 25 October against Blake Monroe, where Zaria lost the title to Monroe. At Night 1 of NXT: Gold Rush on 18 November, during Ruca's NXT Women's North American Championship match against Monroe, Zaria threw in the towel on Ruca's behalf, leading to a backstage argument between the two. At Night 2 of NXT: Gold Rush aired on tape delay on the following week, Zaria, who qualified to the WWE Women's Speed Championship Tournament final, lost to Fallon Henley for the title vacated by Ruca.

On the 20 January 2026 episode of NXT, ZaRuca defeated Fatal Influence (Fallon Henley and Lainey Reid) and WrenQCC (Wren Sinclair and Kendal Grey) in a triple threat tag team match to earn a TNA Knockouts World Tag Team Championship match. They failed to defeat The Elegance Brand (Heather by Elegance and M by Elegance) for the titles on the 3 February episode of NXT after infighting between the pair.

==== Singles competition (2026–present) ====
On the 24 February episode of NXT, Zaria turned on Ruca prior to Ruca's NXT Women's Championship match against Jacy Jayne. On the following week, Ruca retaliated by taking out both Zaria and Jayne during their championship match. Zaria and Ruca faced each other at NXT Stand & Deliver on 4 April with Ruca coming out victorious after delivering three Sol Snatchers on Zaria. At Week 2 of NXT: Revenge on 21 April, Zaria defeated Ruca in a Last Women Standing match to end their feud as Ruca was promoted to the main roster. Immediately after, Zaria set her sights on the NXT Women's North American Championship held by Tatum Paxley. On the 9 June episode of NXT, Zaria defeated Paxley to win the title. At NXT Heatwave on 30 August, Zaria defeated WWE Women's Speed Champion Wren Sinclair and Kali Armstrong in a Winner Takes All triple threat match to unify the WWE Women's Speed Championship and the NXT Women's North American Championship. However, Zaria was not recognised as the final WWE Women's Speed Champion.

=== Total Nonstop Action Wrestling (2026) ===
Hodder made her Total Nonstop Action Wrestling (TNA) debut as Zaria at Thursday Night Impact! premiere on AMC on 15 January 2026 with Sol Ruca to scout for a potential title shot at the TNA Knockouts World Tag Team Championship. She later answered the open challenge title defence by TNA Knockouts World Champion Léi Yǐng Lee set at Genesis two days later but failed to win the title.

== Championships and accomplishments ==
- Melbourne City Wrestling
  - MCW Intercommonwealth Championship (1 time)
  - MCW Women's Championship (2 times)
- New Horizon Pro Wrestling
  - Global Conflict Shield Tournament (2024)
- Pro Wrestling Illustrated
  - Ranked No. 128 of the top 250 female wrestlers in the PWI Women's 250 in 2025
- Riot City Wrestling
  - RCW Championship (1 time, final)
  - RCW Grand Championship (1 time, inaugural)
  - RCW Tag Team Championship (2 times) – with Dean Brady
  - RCW Women's Championship (1 time, final)
  - Strength Cup (2023)
- WWE
  - NXT Women's North American Championship (1 time, current)
  - WWE Women's Speed Championship (1 time, final)
  - NXT Year-End Award (1 time)
    - Tag Team of the Year (2025) – ZaRuca (with Sol Ruca)
