= WSW World Heavyweight Championship =

Wrestling world championship

- WSW World Heavyweight Championship belt (2018–2022)

Details
- Promotion: World Series Wrestling
- Date established: 5 October 2005
- Current champion: Killer Kross
Statistics
- First champion: Rhino
- Most reigns: Matt Cardona (3 reigns)
- Longest reign: Jeff Jarrett (570 days)
- Shortest reign: Brian Cage and Johnny Impact (1 day)
- Oldest champion: Austin Aries (40 years, 70 days)
- Youngest champion: Bryan Danielson (26 years, 10 days)

The WSW World Heavyweight Championship is a professional wrestling world championship contested for in the heavyweight division of World Series Wrestling (WSW).

== History ==
On 5 October 2005, during WSW's first show, Rhino became the inaugural champion by defeating Jeff Jarrett, during a tour that took part in Melbourne, Victoria. Rhino held the championship for three days before losing it to Jarrett on 8 October. On 1 May 2007, due to Jarrett's commitments with Total Nonstop Action (TNA), WSW stippred him of the championship. on 1 June, Bryan Danielson won the vacant championship by defeating Nigel McGuinness.

On 31 August 2007, the championship was deactivated as WSW went to hiatus. Ten years later, on 25 November 2017, Ricochet won the now reactivated championship after defeating Austin Aries and Brian Cage in a three-way match. In 2019, the championship was vacated with the previous titleholder being Marty Scurll. On 8 July 2022, Johnny Downunder won the vacant championship after defeating Joey Janela in a no disqualification match. Downunder has previously won the title under the ring name Johnny Impact.

== Reigns ==
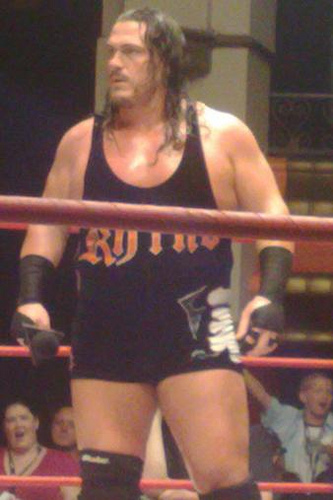
The inaugural champion Rhino

As of 2 November 2026, there have been 15 reigns between 12 wrestlers and two vacancies. Rhino was the inaugural champion. Matt Cardona holds the record for most reigns at three. Aries is the oldest champion at 40 years old, while Bryan Danielson is the youngest at 26 years old. Jeff Jarrett's reign is the longest at 570 days, while Brian Cage and Impact's first reign was the shortest at one day.

Killer Kross is the current champion in his First reign

Key
No.	Overall reign number
Reign	Reign number for the specific champion
Days	Number of days held
+	Current reign is changing daily

No.	Champion	Championship change			Reign statistics		Notes	Ref.
No.	Champion	Date	Event	Location	Reign	Days	Notes	Ref.
1	Rhino	5 October 2005	International Assault Tour; Day 1	Melbourne, Victoria	1	3	Defeated Jeff Jarrett to become inaugural champion.	
2	Jeff Jarrett	8 October 2005	International Assault Tour; Day 3	Newcastle, New South Wales	1	570		
—	Vacated	1 May 2007	—	—	—	—	WSW stripped Jeff Jarrett of the championship due to his commitments with Total Nonstop Action (TNA).	
3	Bryan Danielson	1 June 2007	International Assault Tour; Day 1	Kensington, New South Wales	1	2	Defeated Nigel McGuinness to win the vacant title.	
4	Billy Kidman	3 June 2007	International Assault Tour; Day 3	Newcastle West, New South Wales	1	89		
—	Deactivated	31 August 2007	—	—	—	—	The championship became inactive after WSW went to hiatus.	
5	Ricochet	25 November 2017	International Assault Tour 2K17; Day 2	Adelaide, South Australia	1	2	Defeated Austin Aries and Brian Cage in a three-way match to win the vacant title.	
6	Austin Aries	27 November 2017	International Assault Tour 2K17; Day 4	Penrith, New South Wales	1	207		
7	Brian Cage	22 June 2018	International Assault Best of the Best 2K18; Day 1	Ferntree Gully, Victoria	1	1	This was a three-way match, also involving Johnny Impact.	
8	Johnny Impact	23 June 2018	International Assault Best of the Best 2K18; Day 2	Ferntree Gully, Victoria	1	1		
9	Austin Aries	24 June 2018	International Assault Best of the best 2K18; Day 3	Adelaide, South Australia	2	155		
10	Robbie Eagles	26 November 2018	International Assault the Elite Takeover; Day 4	Ferntree Gully, Victoria	1	208		
11	Marty Scurll	22 June 2019	International Assault Zero Fear; Day 2	Ferntree Gully, Victoria	1	N/A (Note: The length of the championship reign is too uncertain to calculate.)		
Championship history is unrecorded from June 23, 2019 to July 8, 2022.
12	Johnny Downunder	8 July 2022	Phoenix Rising; Day 1	Adelaide, South Australia	2	246	Defeated Joey Janela in a No Disqualification match to win the vacant title. Downunder was previously known as Johnny Impact.	
13	Matt Cardona	11 March 2023	Unleash Hell; Day 2	Melbourne, Victoria	1	209		
14	Shawn Spears	6 October 2023	Full Throttle; Day 1	Melbourne, Victoria	1	7		
15	Matt Cardona	13 October 2023	Full Throttle; Day 6	Sydney, New South Wales	2	261		
16	Nic Nemeth	30 June 2024	Most Wanted; Day 4	Adelaide, South Australia	1	274	Defeated Hammerstone in a No Disqualification match, who substituted for Cardona due to Cardona's torn pec injury.	
17	Matt Cardona	31 March 2025	Legacy; Day 4	Sydney, New South Wales	3	280	This was a Sydney Street Fight, which was also for the Nemeth's Internet Championship.	

== Combined reigns ==
†	Indicates the current champion.
N/A	The exact length of a title reign is too uncertain to calculate.

Rank	Wrestler	No. of Reigns	Combined Days
1	Matt Cardona	3	750
2	Jeff Jarrett	1	540
3	Austin Aries	2	362
4	Nic Nemeth	1	274
5	Johnny Downunder/Impact	2	247
6	Robbie Eagles	1	208
7	Killer Kross †	1	171+
8	Billy Kidman	1	89
9	Shawn Spears	1	7
10	Rhino	1	3
11	Bryan Danielson	1	2
11	Ricochet	1	2
13	Brian Cage	1	1
14	Marty Scurll	1	N/A
