= Cassie Lee =

Australian professional wrestler

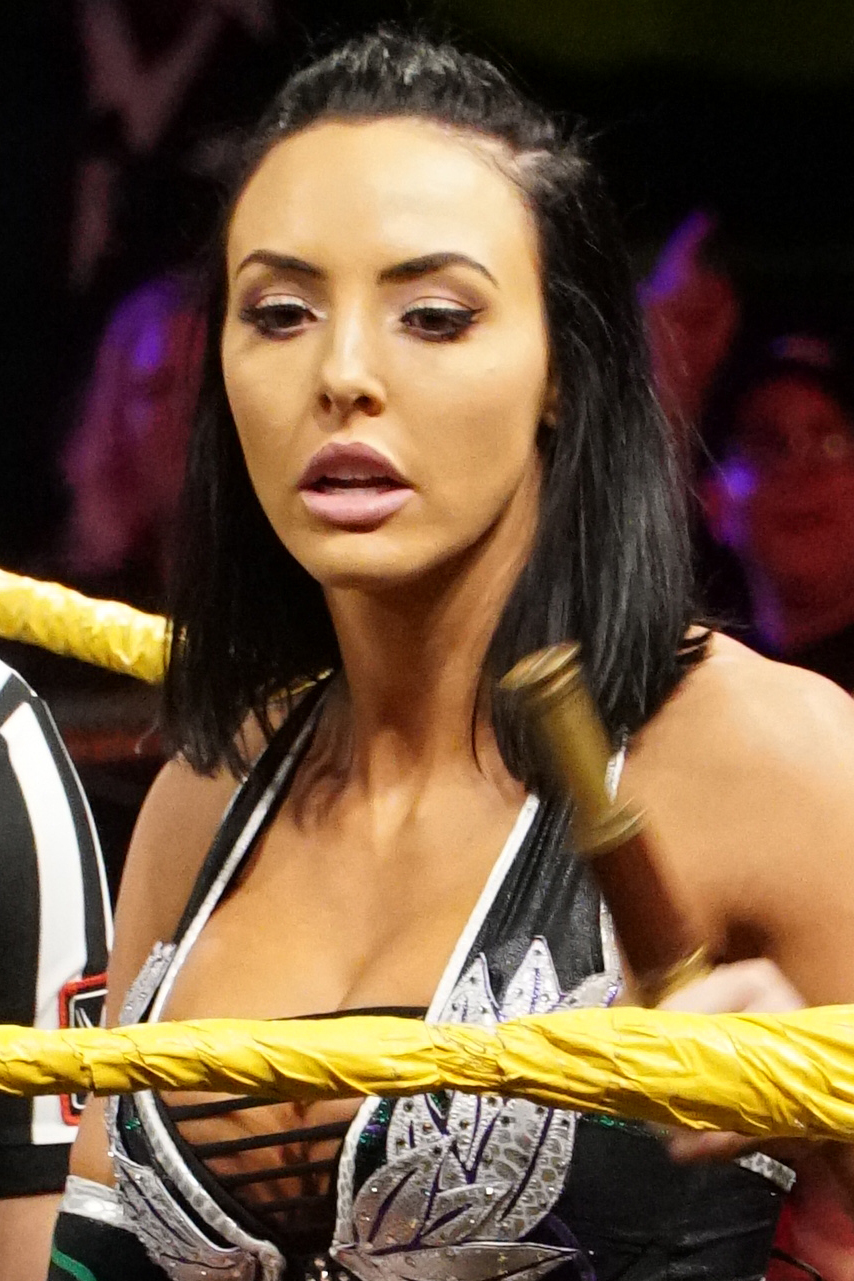
- Lee in 2018

Personal information
- Born: Cassandra MacIntosh; 10 November 1992 (age 34) Sydney, New South Wales, Australia
- Spouse: Shawn Spears (m. 2019)
- Children: 2

Professional wrestling career
- Ring name(s): Jessica; Cassie; Cassie Lee; KC Cassidy; Peyton Royce
- Billed height: 5 ft 7 in (170 cm)
- Billed weight: 132 lb (60 kg)
- Billed from: Australia; Sydney, Australia
- Trained by: Madison Eagles; Lance Storm; Pro Wrestling Alliance Australia
- Debut: 28 February 2009

Cassandra Arneill (née MacIntosh; born 10 November 1992), known by her ring name Cassie Lee, is an Australian professional wrestler. She is signed to All Elite Wrestling (AEW), where she is a member of The IInspiration alongside Jessie McKay. She is best known for her tenure with WWE from 2015 to 2021, where she performed under the name Peyton Royce.

In February 2009, Arneill made her professional wrestling debut at Pro Wrestling Women's Alliance (PWWA) as KC Cassidy, and competed on the independent circuit with multiple promotions for several years, becoming a one-time PWA Women's Champion, and winning the Vera and Jenny Memorial Cup in support of breast cancer. Arneill signed a contract with WWE in 2015, and was assigned to WWE's developmental brand NXT in Orlando, Florida.

== Early life ==
Arneill was born in Sydney and later moved to Melbourne and then Calgary, Alberta, Canada, to train with Lance Storm. Prior to her training, she excelled in dance. She attended the same high school, Westfields Sports, as fellow wrestler and future tag team partner Jessie McKay. Arneill began watching wrestling at the age of nine and cites Eddie Guerrero as her inspiration to become a professional wrestler.

== Professional wrestling career ==
=== Independent circuit (2009–present) ===
On 28 February 2009, Arneill made her professional wrestling debut in Pro Wrestling Women's Alliance as KC Cassidy, teaming with Robbie Eagles in a mixed tag team match, defeating Madison Eagles and Mike Valuable. For the next year in the promotion, she traded victories with Jessie McKay in singles matches, including a loss in a PWWA championship match. On 7 January 2011, she unsuccessfully challenged Madison Eagles for the championship. On 20 June 2011, KC Cassidy and Tenille Tayla defeated Eliza Sway and Shazza McKenzie. Cassidy made two appearances for the American all-female promotion Shimmer Women Athletes as Bambi Hall's tag team partner. She was originally the scheduled opponent for Su Yung at a Shine Wrestling event in Ybor City, Florida, but instead became the replacement opponent for Rhia O'Reilly. She also appeared for promotions Pro Wrestling Alliance Australia, New Horizons Pro Wrestling, Melbourne City Wrestling and Riot City Wrestling.

=== WWE (2015–2021) ===
==== Early years in NXT (2015–2016) ====
Arneill received a tryout with WWE during their tour of Australia in August 2014 and became an NXT trainee on 13 April 2015. She made her televised in-ring debut on the 15 May episode of NXT, using the KC Cassidy name in a loss to NXT Women's Champion Sasha Banks. On the 22 July episode of NXT, Arneill lost to Eva Marie. On 7 August, she was given the new ring name Peyton Royce. After being a face throughout her NXT run, Royce began wrestling as a heel in a non-title loss to NXT Women's Champion Bayley on the 9 December episode of NXT. On the 13 January 2016 episode of NXT, Royce competed in a number one contender's battle royal for Bayley's NXT Women's Championship, which was won by Carmella.

==== The IIconics (2016–2021) ====
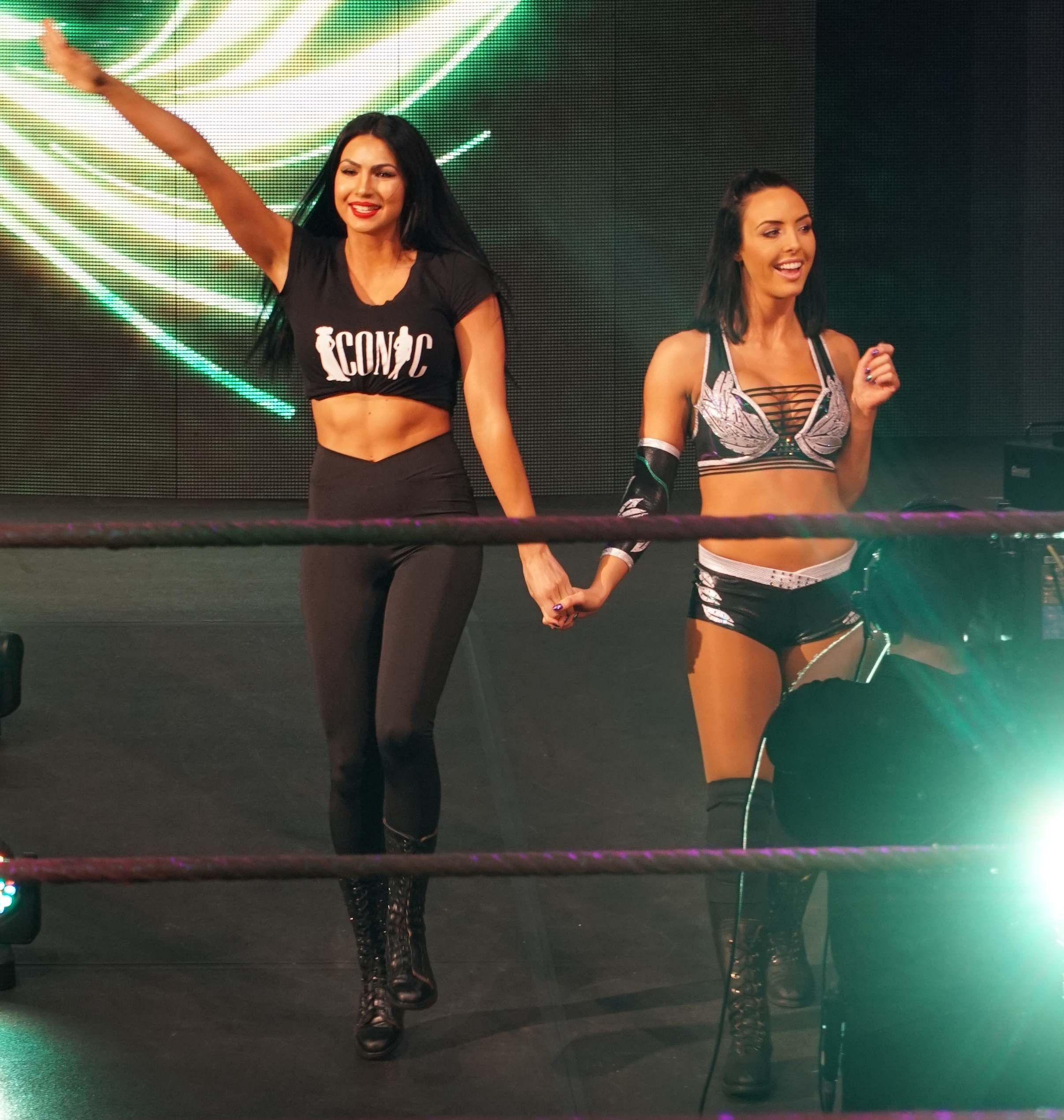
Royce with tag team partner Billie Kay in 2018

In October, Royce formed an alliance with Billie Kay, later dubbed The Iconic Duo. The duo subsequently entered a feud with Liv Morgan, which culminated in a six-woman tag team match on the 23 November episode of NXT, in which Morgan, Aliyah, and Ember Moon defeated Royce, Kay, and Daria Berenato. In the end of December, Kay and Royce were placed in a brief feud with the NXT Women's Champion Asuka after the latter stated there is no competition for her. On 28 January 2017 at TakeOver: San Antonio, Royce competed in a fatal four-way match against Kay, Nikki Cross, and Asuka, in which Royce failed to capture the NXT Women's Championship. Shortly after that, in the end of February, Royce defeated Ember Moon and Liv Morgan in a triple–threat to earn another opportunity at Asuka's NXT Women's Championship, which she once again failed to win.

Throughout the year, Royce continued to rack up victories over competitors like Aliyah, Sarah Logan, and Ruby Riot. After defeating Liv Morgan and Nikki Cross in a triple-threat match, at TakeOver: WarGames, Royce competed in a fatal four-way match for the vacant NXT Women's Championship, which was ultimately won by Ember Moon. In December, Royce lost to Moon in a non-title match, which was her final match for NXT. Royce made her first main roster appearance on 8 April 2018 at WrestleMania 34, competing along with several other NXT superstars in the first WrestleMania Women's Battle Royal where she was eliminated by Sarah Logan.

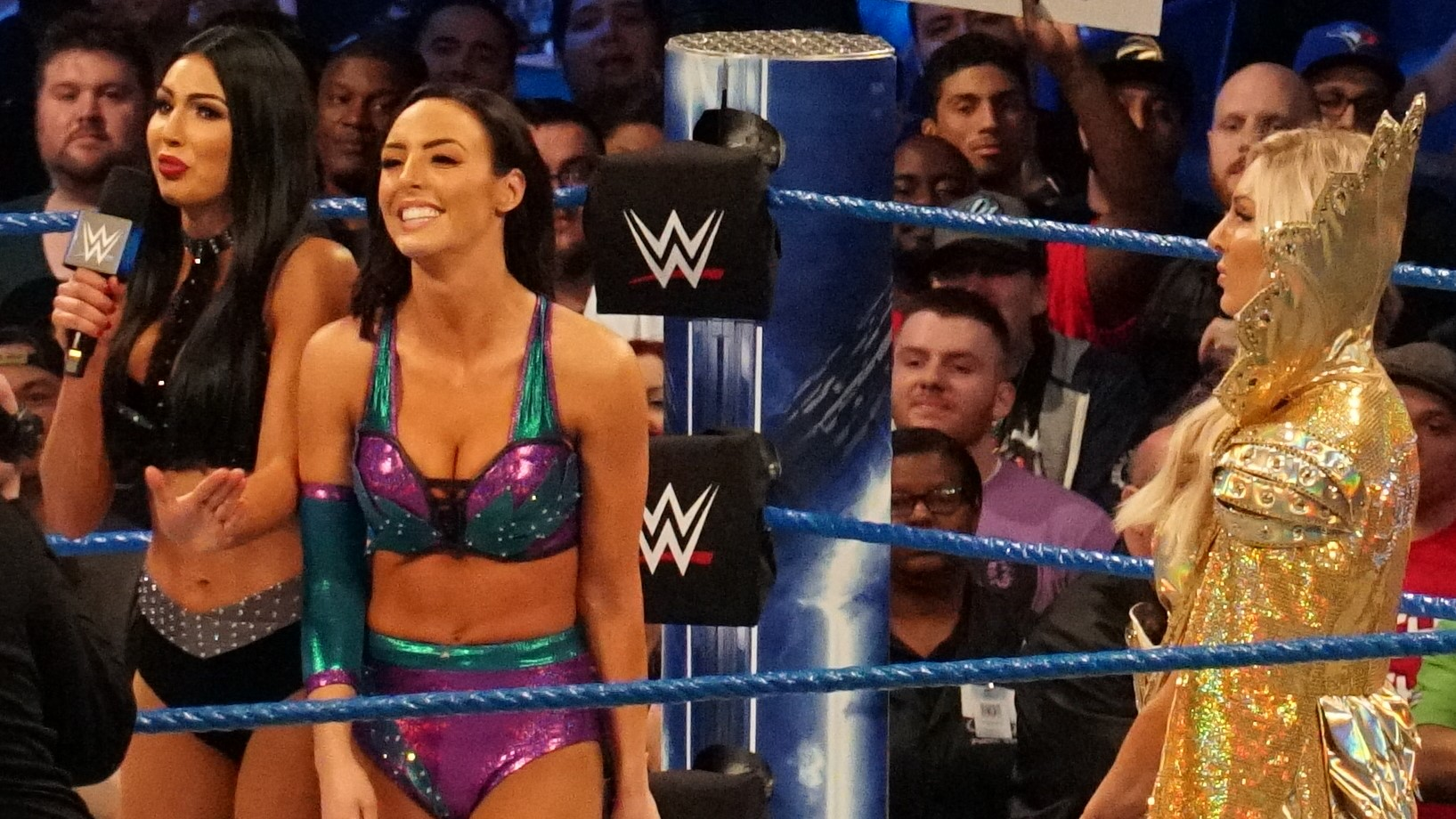
The IIconics debuted on SmackDown by interrupting Charlotte Flair

Royce and Kay, now dubbed The IIconics, made their main roster debut on the 10 April 2018 episode of SmackDown Live attacking SmackDown Women's Champion Charlotte Flair, while she was cutting a promo about her match at WrestleMania 34. Two weeks later, The IIconics racked up their first victory, as part of the main roster, over Asuka and Becky Lynch. Throughout the next few months, Royce competed in various singles and tag team matches but ended up on the losing end on them all. In August, The IIconics started their first feud on the main roster, with Naomi, and the two were able to defeat her in singles matches. Eventually, Naomi teamed up with Asuka but lost to The IIconics at the Super Show-Down on 6 October, held in the latter's homeland of Australia. Three weeks later, both Royce and Kay took part in WWE's first all-women's pay-per-view, Evolution; they were the first two eliminated from a battle royal for a future women's championship match.

On 27 January 2019, both Kay and Royce entered their first Royal Rumble match at number 7 and number 9, respectively, and they managed to eliminate Nikki Cross, before they both were eliminated by Lacey Evans. On 17 February, at the Elimination Chamber event, The IIconics competed in a tag team Elimination Chamber match for the inaugural WWE Women's Tag Team Championship, which was won by The Boss 'n' Hug Connection (Bayley and Sasha Banks). In March, The IIconics started a feud with Banks and Bayley, whom they defeated in a non-title match. Because of their win, they (and two other teams) challenged Banks and Bayley for the championship at WrestleMania 35 in a fatal four-way match. At the event, which took place on 7 April, The IIconics won the match after Kay pinned Bayley to win the Women's Tag Team Championship for the first time. On the 5 August episode of Raw, The IIconics lost the titles to Alexa Bliss and Nikki Cross in a fatal four-way match.

On 16 October 2019, it was announced that The IIconics had been drafted to Raw as supplemental picks of the 2019 WWE Draft. After a brief hiatus, Royce and Kay made their return on the 11 May 2020 episode of Raw, interrupting WWE Women's Tag Team Champions Alexa Bliss and Nikki Cross. They later defeated the champions in a non-title match. They would unsuccessfully challenge for the WWE Women's Tag Team Championships multiple times throughout the summer. They would begin a feud with Ruby Riott mocking her backstage for not having any friends. They would go on to trade victories as Kay and Royce defeated Riott while Riott defeated Kay. At Payback, The IIconics were defeated by Riott and her newly reunited tag partner Liv Morgan. The following night on Raw, The IIconics were forced to disband after losing to The Riott Squad per stipulation.

On 12 October 2020 during the 2020 WWE Draft, Peyton remained on Raw, while her former tag team partner Billie moved to SmackDown. She would begin to team with Lacey Evans until Evans announced her pregnancy. On the 22 March 2021 episode of Raw, Royce faced Raw Women's Champion Asuka in a losing effort. This would in turn be her final match in WWE, as on 15 April 2021, Royce was released from her WWE contract along with other WWE talent including her former partner Billie Kay.

=== Impact Wrestling (2021–2022) ===
At Knockouts Knockdown on 9 October 2021, it was announced that The IIconics, now known as The IInspiration, would be making their debut for Impact Wrestling at Bound for Glory. At Bound for Glory, they defeated Decay (Havok and Rosemary) to win the Impact Knockouts World Tag Team Championship. On 20 November, at Turning Point, The IInspiration had their first successful title defence, when they defeated Decay once again. At Sacrifice, The IInspiration lost the titles to The Influence (Madison Rayne and Tenille Dashwood).

On 27 April 2022, Arniell and McKay requested their immediate release from Impact Wrestling, with a statement they released on their Twitter accounts.

=== Total Nonstop Action Wrestling (2025–2026) ===
On 6 June 2025, during Against All Odds, Lee and McKay made their Total Nonstop Action Wrestling (TNA) return, formerly known as Impact Wrestling, confronting the Knockouts World Tag Team Champions The Elegance Brand (Ash by Elegance and Heather by Elegance). They won the titles during the TV taping on 27 September 2025, but lost the titles back to The Elegance Brand (Heather by Elegance and M by Elegance) on Thursday Night Impact!'s AMC debut on January 15, 2026.

=== All Elite Wrestling (2026–present) ===
Both Lee and Jessie McKay, as The IInspiration, would make their All Elite Wrestling (AEW) tag team debut and announced that they had signed with the promotion at a house show in Brisbane, Australia on February 15, 2026. They made their in-ring debut on the 4 March episode of Dynamite, losing to The Brawling Birds (Alex Windsor and Jamie Hayter) in a squash match.

=== Tokyo Joshi Pro-Wrestling (2026–present) ===
On 17 March 2026, The Iinspiration made their Tokyo Joshi Pro-Wrestling (TJPW) debut during the first day of an event in the United States, where they defeated Shoko Nakajima and Wakana Uehara. On 23 March, during the Grand Princess event, they defeated Ober Eats (Yuki Kamifuku and Wakana Uehara) to win the Princess Tag Team Championship. On 16 April, they had their first successful title defence against Kyoraku Kyomei (Hyper Misao and Shoko Nakajima). On May 4, The Iinspiration lost their title to Hakuchuumu (Miu Watanabe and Rika Tatsumi), ending their reign at 36 days.

== Other media ==
Arneill as Peyton Royce made her WWE video game debut as a playable character in WWE 2K18 and has since appeared in WWE 2K19, WWE 2K20, WWE 2K22 and WWE 2K Battlegrounds.

On 16 May 2021, Arneill along with longtime tag team partner and best friend Jessica McKay launched a comedy and variety podcast titled Off Her Chops.

== Personal life ==
In August 2019, McIntosh married Canadian wrestler Ronnie Arneill, best known by his ring names Shawn Spears and Tye Dillinger. The couple have two children.

== Championships and accomplishments ==
- Impact Wrestling / Total Nonstop Action Wrestling
  - Impact / TNA Knockouts World Tag Team Championship (2 times) – with Jessie McKay
- Melbourne City Wrestling
  - Vera and Jenny Memorial Cup (2014)
- Prairie Wrestling Alliance
  - PWA Women's Championship (1 time)
- Pro Wrestling Illustrated
  - Ranked 43 of the top 50 female wrestlers in the PWI Female 50 in 2017
  - Ranked No. 50 of the top 50 tag teams in the PWI Tag Team 50 in 2020 – with Billie Kay
- Tokyo Joshi Pro-Wrestling
  - Princess Tag Team Championship (1 time) – with Jessie McKay
- World Series Wrestling
  - WSW Women's Championship (1 time)
- Women's Wrestling Fan Awards
  - Most Underrated Wrestler of the Year (2018) – with Billie Kay
- WWE
  - WWE Women's Tag Team Championship (1 time) – with Billie Kay
  - NXT Year-End Award (1 time)
    - Breakout of the Year (2016) – with Billie Kay
