= List of professional wrestling organisations in Australia =

This list of professional wrestling promotions in Australia includes both notable active and defunct promotions.

== List of promotions ==
=== Active ===
==== New South Wales ====
Name	Location	Owner(s)	Years active	Notes
Australasian Wrestling Federation	Shalvey	Greg Bownds	1999–present	

==== Queensland ====
Name	Location	Owner(s)	Years active	Notes
Impact Pro Wrestling Australia	Gold Coast		2001–present	Founded as World Championship Wrestling Australia 2001–2005 and Major Impact Wrestling 2001–2005. Merged with Impact Pro Wrestling in 2007.

==== South Australia ====
Name	Location	Owner(s)	Years active	Notes
Riot City Wrestling	Adelaide	Joe Greco	2006–present	
World Series Wrestling	Adelaide	Adrian Manera	2005–2007 2017–present	

==== Victoria ====
Name	Location	Owner(s)	Years active	Notes
Melbourne City Wrestling	Melbourne	Hot Tag Communications network	2010–present	

=== Defunct (Notable) ===
Name	Location	Owner(s)	Years active	Notes
i-Generation Superstars of Wrestling	All over Australia	Andrew McManus	2000–2001	
Pro Wrestling Women's Alliance	New South Wales	Madison Eagles Ryan Eagles	2007–2013	Was affiliated with Pro Wrestling Australia and Shimmer Women Athletes. PWWA was Australia's only all women's Pro Wrestling Company.
World Championship Wrestling	All over Australia	Ron Miller (1975–1978) Larry O'Dea (1975–1978) Tony Kolonie (1974) Johnny Doyle (1964–1969) Jim Barnett (1964–1973)	1964–1978	
World Wrestling All-Stars	Worldwide - based in Australia	Andrew McManus	2001–2003	

== See also ==
- Professional wrestling in Australia
- List of professional wrestling promotions
