= Bronson Reed =

Australian professional wrestler (born 1988)

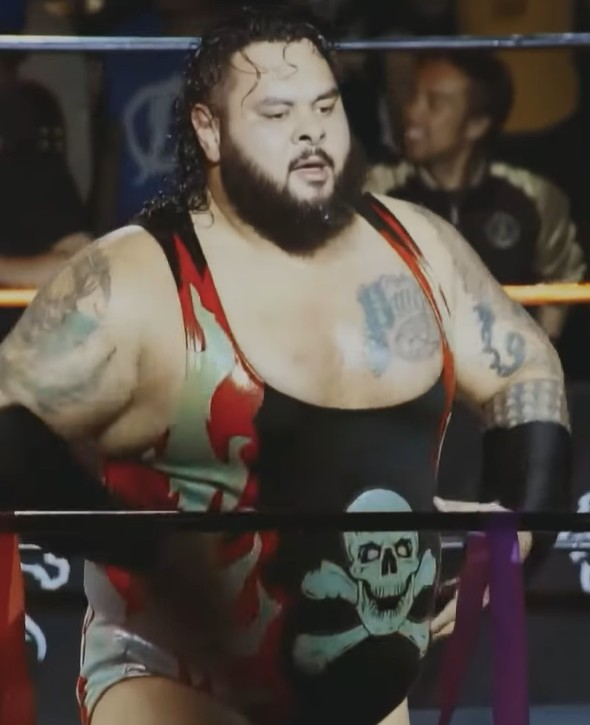
- Reed in 2022

Personal information
- Born: Jermaine Haley; 25 August 1988 (age 38) Adelaide, South Australia, Australia
- Spouse: Paige Haley
- Children: 1

Professional wrestling career
- Ring name(s): Bronson Reed; J-Rock; Jermaine Hailey; Jonah; Jonah Rock
- Billed height: 6 ft 0 in (183 cm)
- Billed weight: 330 lb (150 kg) – 270 lb (120 kg)
- Billed from: Black Forest, South Australia
- Trained by: Damian Slater; Hartley Jackson
- Debut: May 19, 2007

Jermaine Haley (born 25 August 1988) is an Australian professional wrestler. As of December 2022, he is signed to WWE, where he performs on the Raw brand under the ring name Bronson Reed and is a member of The Vision stable.

In WWE, he is a former one-time NXT North American Champion and the winner of the 2024 André the Giant Memorial Battle Royal. He is also known for his tenures with various promotions such as Total Nonstop Action Wrestling (TNA) and New Japan Pro-Wrestling (NJPW), where he performed under the ring name Jonah Rock, or simply Jonah (often stylised in all caps).

== Early life ==
Jermaine Haley was born on 25 August 1988 in Adelaide, South Australia into a family of Samoan descent. He played an array of sports throughout his childhood, which included Australian rules football, soccer, rugby and basketball. However, Haley maintained a strong interest in professional wrestling all through his schooling years and decided to pursue a career in the industry following graduation from high school.

== Professional wrestling career ==
=== Independent circuit (2007–2019) ===
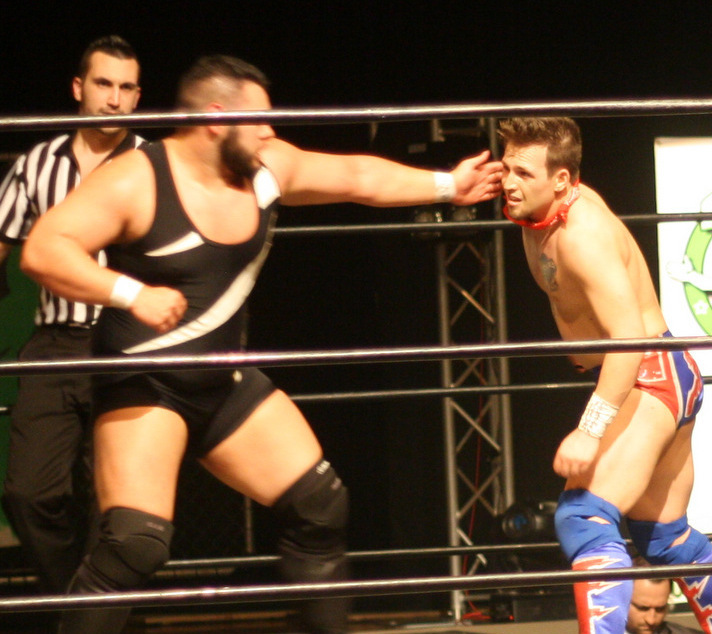
Jonah Rock (left) against Robbie Eagles in 2013

Debuting in 2007 under the ring names Jonah Rock and J-Rock, he spent 11 years working throughout the Australian independent circuit. While wrestling in Australia, Rock earned numerous titles. He is a former three-time Wrestle Rampage Australian National Champion, former one-time Explosive Pro Wrestling Tag Team Champion, former one-time Pacific Pro Wrestling Heavyweight Championship, former one-time Heavyweight Champion, former one-time Professional Wrestling Alliance Heavyweight Champion and a former one-time Melbourne City Wrestling World Heavyweight Champion, one-time Intercommonwealth Champion and one-time Tag Team Champion.

Rock's early work was not limited to solely appearing in Australian promotions. He also appeared in Japan's Pro Wrestling NOAH promotion, the British promotions Revolution Pro Wrestling and PROGRESS Wrestling, the German promotion Westside Xtreme Wrestling and the American independent promotion Pro Wrestling Guerrilla.

=== WWE (2019–2021) ===
In January 2019, Haley's signing was announced along with 11 other recruits where he would report to the WWE's developmental territory NXT. On 9 March, he would make his debut on an NXT live event wrestling under his real name losing to Riddick Moss. In June, his ring name was changed to Bronson Reed. On the 17 July episode of NXT, Reed made his official televised debut competing in the NXT Breakout Tournament as a face, where he defeated Dexter Lumis in the first round but was defeated by Cameron Grimes in the quarter-finals. On the 21 August episode of NXT, Reed was defeated by his former TMDK stablemate Shane Thorne.

Reaching 2020, on the 5 February episode of NXT, he was attacked by The Undisputed Era backstage after trying to come to the aid of Kushida. The following week, he challenged Roderick Strong to a match but was defeated. On the 3 June episode of NXT, Reed was defeated by Grimes. Following the match, he was attacked by Karrion Kross. On the 17 June episode of NXT, Reed defeated Leon Ruff and called out Kross challenging him to a match for the next week. The following week, Reed was defeated by Kross. Next, Reed would enter a short feud with newcomer LA Knight, defeating him in a singles match. After gaining momentum, he focused on the NXT North American Championship. At NXT TakeOver XXX in August, Reed was unsuccessful in winning the title.

In April 2021, on Night 1 of NXT TakeOver: Stand & Deliver, Reed won a Six-man Gauntlet Eliminator match, to become the #1 contender for the North American Championship. On Night 2 of the event, Reed faced the reigning champion Johnny Gargano in a losing effort, but defeated him on the 18 May episode of NXT in a steel cage match to win the title, becoming the first Australian and non-American wrestler to hold the NXT North American Championship. At NXT TakeOver: In Your House, Reed teamed with the NXT Tag Team Champions, MSK to successfully defend their titles against Legado Del Fantasma in a winner take all match. On the 29 June episode of NXT, Reed dropped the title to Isaiah "Swerve" Scott after interference from Hit Row, ending his reign at 42 days. On the 27 July episode of NXT, Reed was defeated by Adam Cole in what would be his final WWE match in this stint. On 6 August, Haley was released from his WWE contract.

=== New Japan Pro-Wrestling (2021–2022) ===
At Battle in the Valley on 13 November 2021, Haley, using the ring name Jonah, made his New Japan Pro-Wrestling (NJPW) debut, attacking FinJuice (David Finlay and Juice Robinson), establishing himself as a heel in the process. After his debut, Jonah would go on short lived winning streak defeating Lucas Riley in his NJPW in-ring debut and then a month later defeating David Finlay. On 15 January 2022, Jonah suffered his first NJPW loss in a tag team match against FinJuice as he teamed with Bad Dude Tito. On 6 March, Shane Haste, assisted Jonah and Tito, in defeating FinJuice and reformed The Mighty Don't Kneel as a stable.

On 12 June during Dominion 6.12 in Osaka-jo Hall, Jonah was announced as a participant in the G1 Climax 32 tournament starting in July, as a part of the A block. Jonah scored 8 points in his block, narrowly missing out on a spot in the semi-finals. However, one of Jonah's wins was an upset victory over former IWGP World Heavyweight Champion and eventual tournament winner Kazuchika Okada.

=== Impact Wrestling (2021–2022) ===
At Turning Point on 20 November 2021, Jonah made his Impact Wrestling debut, attacking Josh Alexander and leaving him bloodied. They had a match at Hard To Kill, where Alexander defeated him. After his loss to Alexander, Jonah would embark on a winning streak defeating the likes of Crazzy Steve, Black Taurus, Raj Singh, and Honor No More's PCO. His winning streak would come to an end at Rebellion, after being defeated by Tomohiro Ishii. His final match was a loss to PCO in a Monster's Ball match. On 6 May, Jonah announced his departure from the company.

=== Return to WWE ===
==== Various feuds (2022–2024) ====
Bronson Reed made his unannounced return to WWE on 19 December 2022 episode of Raw, where he helped The Miz defeat Dexter Lumis in a ladder match, establishing himself as a heel. On 30 January 2023 episode of Raw, Reed defeated Dolph Ziggler to qualify for the Elimination Chamber match for the United States Championship at the namesake event, where he was the first participant eliminated. After being eliminated last in the Andre the Giant Memorial Battle Royal by Bobby Lashley, Reed engaged a feud with Lashley from the 10 April episode of Raw, which led to a match and both men were counted out, despite his exhaustion. A week later on Raw, Reed interfered in a match between Lashley and Austin Theory, which led to a beat down of Lashley, leaving him lying in the ring. A few days later, on 21 April episode of SmackDown, Reed was added to a triple threat match for the United States Championship at Backlash, where Reed was unsuccessful in winning the title, as he was pinned by Theory. From July 2023 until March 2025, he was named as "Big" Bronson Reed. On 9 October episode of Raw, Reed won a triple threat match to become the number one contender to Gunther's Intercontinental Championship, but failed to win the title the following week on Raw.

On the WrestleMania edition of SmackDown, on 5 April 2024, Reed won the André the Giant Memorial Battle Royal. On 29 April episode of Raw, Reed challenged for the Intercontinental Championship against Sami Zayn, which he lost by disqualification after Chad Gable attacked Zayn. One week later, Reed faced Gable when Zayn attacked Gable, causing another disqualification. Later that night, it was announced that Reed would challenge for the title in a triple threat match with Zayn and Gable at King and Queen of the Ring, where Zayn retained his title. On 5 August 2024 episode of Raw, Reed attacked Seth "Freakin" Rollins, hitting him with six Tsunami splashes. For the rest of the summer, Reed feuded with Braun Strowman, with the feud ending on the 30 September episode of Raw, where Reed lost to Strowman in a Last Monster Standing match, due to interference by a returning Rollins. On 2 November at Crown Jewel, Reed was defeated by Rollins. On the 15 November episode of SmackDown, Reed aligned himself with The Bloodline (Solo Sikoa, Tama Tonga, Tonga Loa, and Jacob Fatu), revealing himself as the fifth member for their WarGames team against Roman Reigns, Jey Uso, Jimmy Uso, and Sami Zayn. At Survivor Series: WarGames on 30 November, Reed and The Bloodline lost to Reigns, The Usos, Zayn and CM Punk in the match. After the event, it was revealed Reed suffered a foot injury during the match, putting him out of action for an undisclosed amount of time.

==== The Vision (2025–present) ====
Reed returned on 24 May 2025 at Saturday Night's Main Event XXXIX, assisting Seth Rollins and Bron Breakker defeat CM Punk and Sami Zayn, aligning himself with Rollins, Breakker, and Paul Heyman. Reed then participated in the 2025 King of the Ring tournament, where he was eliminated in the first round. On 2 August at Night 1 of SummerSlam, Reed and Breakker were defeated by Roman Reigns and Jey Uso. On 4 August episode of Raw, the alliance of Reed, Rollins, Breakker, and Heyman was officially given the name of The Vision. Reed lost to Reigns at Clash in Paris, before defeating him at Crown Jewel in Reed's home country of Australia. On the Raw after Crown Jewel, Reed and Breakker attacked Rollins, effectively removing him from The Vision. At Survivor Series: WarGames on November 29, Breakker and Reed, along with Brock Lesnar, Drew McIntyre, and Logan Paul, defeated the team of Punk, Reigns, The Usos, and Cody Rhodes in a WarGames match, following interference from a mysterious hooded figure which was later revealed to be Austin Theory. Paul and Theory then joined The Vision. At the Royal Rumble on 31 January 2026, Reed entered the match at #16, eliminating Royce Keys and Dragon Lee before being eliminated by LA Knight. On 23 February episode of Raw, Reed failed to win a triple threat Elimination Chamber qualifying match. During the match, Reed suffered a distal biceps tear and was rendered out of action indefinitely. Around this time, he lost around 100 lb, going from over 370 lb (167 kg) to 270 lb (122 kg).

At Sunday Night's Main Event on 6 September, Reed made his return during the match between Breakker and Oba Femi, and attacked the latter. At Money in the Bank, Reed lost to Femi despite assistance from The Vision.

== Personal life ==
Haley is married to his high school sweetheart Paige, who made an appearance on 18 May 2021 episode of NXT after he won the NXT North American Championship. On 24 February 2024, Haley announced that his wife had given birth to their first child.

Haley is a lifelong supporter of the Port Adelaide Football Club in the Australian Football League.

== Championships and accomplishments ==
- Explosive Pro Wrestling
  - EPW Tag Team Championship (1 time) – with Marcius Pitt
- International Wrestling Australia
  - IWA Heavyweight Championship (1 time)
- Melbourne City Wrestling
  - MCW World Heavyweight Championship (1 time)
  - MCW Tag Team Championship (1 time) - with Hartley Jackson
  - MCW Intercommonwealth Championship (1 time)
  - Ballroom Brawl (2017)
  - Third Triple Crown Champion
- NWA Australian Wrestling Alliance
  - NWA AWA Heavyweight Championship (1 time)
  - Queensland Double Crown Championship (1 time)
- Pacific Pro Wrestling
  - PPW Heavyweight Championship (1 time)
- Pro Wrestling Australia
  - PWA Heavyweight Championship (1 time)
- Pro Wrestling Illustrated
  - Ranked No. 73 of the top 500 singles wrestlers in the PWI 500 in 2021
- Wrestle Rampage
  - WR Australian National Championship (3 times)
  - WR Meltdown World Tag Team Championships (1 time) - with Hartley Jackson
- WWE
  - NXT North American Championship (1 time)
  - André the Giant Memorial Battle Royal (2024)
