= Greg Bownds =

Australian professional wrestler

Personal information
- Born: Gregory James Bownds; 20 February 1977 (age 49) Sydney, New South Wales, Australia
- Website: TNTWrestler.com

Professional wrestling career
- Ring name(s): TNT; Aussie Ozbone; TNT Kid; Tommy the Cat; Aleister Rothschild
- Billed height: 6 ft 0 in (1.83 m)
- Billed weight: 220 lb (100 kg)
- Billed from: Sydney, Australia
- Trained by: Shane Fenton, Ken Dunlop, Greg Smit, Andy "Animal" Harpas; Rey Misterio Sr. Phobia
- Debut: 5 April 1994

Gregory James Bownds (born 20 February 1977), better known by his ring name TNT, is an Australian professional wrestler and promoter, currently owning and promoting the Australasian Wrestling Federation.

Bownds is the owner of the AWF promotions and has headlined for other independent promotions across Australia. Bownds has also wrestled in Japan, where he has worked for Pro Wrestling ZERO1-MAX, and Dragon Gate, one of very few Australian wrestlers to do so. He also has studied Mexican lucha libre wrestling whilst in Mexico. He also organises wrestling shows Australia wide for the Supanova Pop Culture Expo.

== Career ==
=== Beginning ===
Bownds wrestled as "Tommy the Cat" and then "TNT Kid" for World Wide Wrestling and Australian Championship Wrestling. He won the Australasian Tag Team Championship with Kiss before leaving the promotion after a backstage dispute and vacated the title. In 1998 Bownds defeated Mark Mercedes for the ACW Australian Heavyweight title in Fairfield, New South Wales when he was 21 years old. From here Bownds moved to International Wrestling Australia in 1998 where he became a popular face. An ankle injury put him out of action for six months in 1999 until he formed the Australasian Wrestling Federation.

=== Australasian Wrestling Federation ===
==== 1999 – 2005 ====
In 1999 Bownds formed the AWF and toured Australia with the likes of Sabu, Marty Jannetty, Super Dragon and Chris Candido. Bownds has made his biggest impact here, he has wrestled in, and booked for, the promotion since its inception in 1999. In August 2001 Bownds (wrestling as TNT) was the winner of an eight-man tournament to become AWF Australasian Champion, defeating Lobo in the finals, holding the title for the next 12 months before losing it to Il Cognito.

In November 2002, TNT regained the AWF Australasian Heavyweight Championship after defeating Il Cognito, in a 30-minute Iron Man match.

Throughout late 2002 and early 2003, Bownds went to Mexico and studied the Lucha libre wrestling style under Rey Misterio, Sr. and Phobia, two of the sports' most respected wrestlers.

In April 2004, TNT attempted to regain the AWF Heavyweight Championship in a championship-crowning fatal fourway match after the title was vacated by the injured Il Cognito. In the match finale TNT was pinned by high flyer Mark Hilton.

Throughout 2005 Bownds feuded with Hilton, Scotty Club and Dean Draven. He also toured Australia, wrestling as part of the World Series Wrestling events (marketed as International Assault), defeating American stars Frankie Kazarian and Super Dragon in a triple threat match at the New South Wales show.

==== 2006 ====
In mid-2006 Greg toured Japan where he wrestled as Aussie Ozbone in Pro Wrestling ZERO1-MAX, he wrestled alongside TNA stars such as Alex Shelley and Chris Sabin.

==== 2007 ====
In January 2007, TNT defeated Steve Ravenous to win his third AWF Championship but lost it to Dragon Gate wrestler Cima soon after, Bownds then regained the title the next night.

In March 2007, TNT defeated Steve Corino in the suburb of Cardiff in Newcastle, New South Wales to win the AWA Superstars of Wrestling World Heavyweight Championship. However, the title would soon be returned to Corino and the title change negated when the "proper paperwork" could not be found.

In May 2007 TNT and the AWF went to Queensland for two shows featuring Bryan Danielson. TNT defeated Danielson on the second show's main event. In June 2007 TNT defended his AWF Heavyweight Championship at International Assault 2 (a co-promotion of the AWF and World Series Wrestling)defeating Kid Kash, Austin Aries and Billy Kidman.

TNT then toured Japan with the Dragon Gate Promotion. Whilst over there he wrestled three matches. TNT teamed with Masaaki Mochizuki and defeated Super Shisa and Super Shenron, then teamed with Ryo Saito and defeated Shingo Takagi and Jack Evans and finally teamed with K-ness and Lupin Matsutani and was defeated by the team of Taka Iwasa, Akira Tozawa and Kenichiro Arai.

TNT defeated Masaaki Mochizuki at the AWF Double Dragon Challenge in July 2007, he also defeated Ryo Saito to successfully retain his AWF Heavyweight Title. In August TNT once again toured with WSW and defended the AWF title against Kid Kash. Later that month the AWF ran a show in which TNT once again successfully defended the AWF Heavyweight Title against Lee Starr.

TNT continued to successfully defend his AWF Australasian Heavyweight Championship throughout 2007 defeating a variety of opponents including Mana, Lebo Ceda, Billy Flyswat, Sean Waltman, Harry Hardshaw (of Irish Whip Wrestling) in Australia and against Sabu (which was a no-contest) and Super Shenron of Dragon Gate. During his tenure as champion he also teamed with Raven to defeat the Platinum Players and the Bastard Brothers on AWF shows. He was named AWFs wrestler of the year for 2007 and was also sought as a contender for the vacant AWA Superstars of Wrestling World Heavyweight Championship in late 2007.

=== 2008 ===
In 2008, TNT continued his title reign throughout Australia and New Zealand and formed a group known as The New Detonation Crew with AWF wrestlers Billy Flyswat, Chris X and Powerhouse Theo. On 11 April 2008, at an AWF tour event at Penrith New South Wales TNT lost the AWF Heavyweight Championship to former WWE and TNA veteran Raven, by pinfall. He later regained the title on 18 April 2008, in Palmerston North, New Zealand.

On 14 November, TNT traveled to Perth, Western Australia where he attended AAW's Superclash and was able to win the AWA Australian Championship off former AAW wrestler Rave and became the second ever holder of the title.

Bownds is the head trainer of the AWF School of Pro Wrestling and has trained over 50 active Australian professional wrestlers. He is currently the AWF's head booker.

=== 2009 ===
2009 saw TNT end his decade long feud with Il Cognito in a Steel Cage match at AWF Psychoticslam, capturing the Australasian Championship for a 6th time. The following night he defended his Australasian Championship against Al Snow. After injuring his shoulder at Florida Championship Wrestling he returned to Australia and vacated the Australasian Championship.

=== 2010 ===
In 2010, TNT began a heel faction called the Detonation Crew and was joined by Iron Ben Coles (aka Iron Jay) and Mighty Mel. Iron Ben Coles would go on to win the AWF Championship under TNT's guidance, a title he would hold till 2013.

=== 2012 ===
TNT returned to the ring after injury to take on Adam Pearce for the NWA World Heavyweight Championship and was defeated. TNT also made his first non-AWF Queensland Appearance when he faced Jade Diamond for the "Australian Heavyweight Championship" at GWE/PWAQ Summer Reign 2012 in December, making the rare decision to choose an interstate booking over AWF which held a show in Sydney on the same night.

==== 2014 ====
TNT won the Gojappe Pro Championship, the first time the title had changed hands in Australia.

2016

Defeated Dean Draven for the AWF Dual Championship (Australasian & Commonwealth Championships) on 3 December 2016 in Penrith, NSW, Australia.

== Championships and accomplishments ==
- All Action Wrestling
  - AAW Australian Championship (1 time)
- Australian Championship Wrestling
  - ACW Australian Heavyweight Championship (1 time)
- Australasian Wrestling Federation
  - AWF Australasian Championship (6 times)
  - AWF Tag Team Championship (1 time) – with Whissky Sixx
  - 2014 OJ Fitzpatrick Cup Tournament Winner
  - PWW Australian Championship
  - Gojappe Pro Championship
- World Wide Wrestling Australia
  - WWW Australasian Tag Team Championship (1 time) – with Kiss
- All Action Wrestling/AAW Australia
  - AWA Australian Championship (1 time)
