= World Series Wrestling =

Australian professional wrestling promotion

- Acronym: WSW
- Founded: 2005
- Style: Professional wrestling
- Headquarters: Australia
- Founder: Adrian Manera
- Owner: Adrian Manera
- Website: https://worldserieswrestling.com.au/

World Series Wrestling (WSW) is an Australian and New Zealand based professional wrestling promotion. Originally founded in 2005. The company is founded, promoted and owned by Adrian Manera..

== History ==
The first tour in 2005, titled International Assault, visited three cities – Melbourne, Sydney and Newcastle – in early October. In Melbourne the first WSW heavyweight champion was crowned in a one-off match between Rhino and Jeff Jarrett, with Rhino gaining the victory. Also on the same night the first of a three match series was contested between A.J. Styles and Christopher Daniels with Styles winning a 30-minute iron man match 1 fall to none. Rhino successfully defended his title against Jarrett in Sydney while Daniels leveled the three match series in Sydney, but on the final night of the tour Jarrett defeated Rhino in Newcastle while Styles won the three match series. The 2005 International Assault Tour also featured the final wrestling matches of ex WWE star, Australia's Nathan Jones.

The second tour in 2007 was also titled International Assault and took place in early June – again visiting the same three cities. The WSW heavyweight title was vacant and another one-off match in Sydney was held to fill the vacancy. Bryan Danielson defeated Nigel McGuinness for the title in a match for the ages. Local Sydney promotion the Australasian Wrestling Federation allowed its Australasian title and tag team titles to be defended on the show, with then AWF champion TNT defending successfully against Billy Kidman. In Melbourne, Danielson successfully defended his title against McGuinness, but in Newcastle Danielson lost the title to Kidman in an amazing match the first and last time the two competed in a singles match. . The tour also featured Kid Kash and the Australian debut of Austin Aries.

Following on from International Assault 2, the next tour which took place in August 2007, entitled Global Attack rocked a near sell out crowd in Adelaide's Thebarton Theatre which featured Billy Kidman successfully defending the Heavyweight Championship against Heidenreich, and the Australian return of Kid Kash as well as the Australian debut of Masato Tanaka.

WSW returned in November 2017 after a 10-year hiatus. Their first tour featured top independent wrestlers Ricochet, Austin Aries, Zack Sabre Jr., Tessa Blanchard, Joey Ryan and Brian Cage. On 25 November, Ricochet defeated Aries to become the new WSW Heavyweight Champion after the title had been vacant since mid-2007. During the following months, the promotion hosted more tours in Australia. On 17 March, The Young Bucks became the inaugural WSW Tag Team champions. On 10 March, Jordynne Grace defeat Kellyanne and Shazza McKenzie in a triple threat match to be crowned the inaugural WSW Women's Champion.

The Sold Out World Series Wrestling tours of Australia have featured Matt Cardona, Brian Cage, Cody Rhodes, Abyss, Hangman Adam Page, Gunther, Bronson Reed, Penta, Rey Fenix, Eric Young, TJP, Shawn Spears, Chelsea Green, John Morrison, Taya Valkyrie, Matt Riddle, Jinder Mahal, Nic Nemeth, Sidney Akeem, Danhausen, The Parea, Lena Kross, Jessica Troy, Slex, Caveman Ugg and the Basso Brothers.

World Series Wrestling is now expanding its footprint, taking their October and November Mega Mania tour to Auckland, New Zealand. This tour will be the first time World Series Wrestling have toured across 2 countries.

== Current champions ==
Championship	Current champion(s)	Reign	Date won	Days held	Location
WSW World Heavyweight Championship	Killer Kross	1	15 May 2026	176+	Adelaide, South Australia
WSW Tag Team Championship	The Good Brothers (Karl Anderson and Doc Gallows)	2	1 November 2026	6+	Brisbane, Queensland
WSW Women's Championship	Shayna Baszler	1	1 November 2026	6+	Melbourne, Victoria
WSW Australian Championship	Ricky Sosa	1	1 November 2026	6+	Melbourne, Victoria

=== WSW Tag Team Championship ===
The WSW Tag Team Championship is a professional wrestling championship contested for in the tag team division of World Series Wrestling.

No.	Champion	Championship change			Reign statistics		Notes	Ref.
No.	Champion	Date	Event	Location	Reign	Days	Notes	Ref.
1	The Young Bucks (Matt Jackson and Nick Jackson)	17 March 2018	International Assault All Star Invasion 2K18; Day 2	Ferntree Gully, Victoria	1	2	Defeated The Briscoes (Jay Briscoe and Mark Briscoe) in the tournament final to become inaugural champions.	
2	Concrete Dongs (Concrete Davidson and Joey Ryan)	19 March 2018	International Assault All Star Invasion 2K18; Day 4	Penrith, New South Wales	1	250	This was a four-way tag team match, also involving The Briscoes (Jay Briscoe and Mark Briscoe) and The Four Nations (Adam Hoffman and Jack Bonza).	
3	Villain Enterprises (Brody King and Marty Scurll)	24 November 2018	International Assault The Elite Takeover; Day 2	Ferntree Gully, Victoria	1	209	Defeated Concrete Davidson and Flip Gordon who replaced an injured Joey Ryan.	
4	The Flippin Machines (Brian Cage and Flip Gordon)	21 June 2019	International Assault Zero Fear; Day 1	Ferntree Gully, Victoria	1	1,361		
5	WarBeard (Erick Redbeard and Matt Basso)	13 March 2023	Unleash Hell; Day 4	Penrith, New South Wales	1	208		
6	The Parea (Gabriel Aeros and Eli Theseus)	7 October 2023	Full Throttle; Day 2	Ferntree Gully, Victoria	1	5		
7	Frankie Kazarian and Eric Young	12 October 2023	Full Throttle; Day 5	Brisbane, Queensland	1	1	This was a three-way tag team match, also involving Top Tier (Mitch Ryder and Tim Hayden).	
8	The Parea (Gabriel Aeros and Eli Theseus)	13 October 2023	Full Throttle; Day 6	Sydney, New South Wales	2	532	This was a four-way tag team match, also involving ABC (Chris Bey and Ace Austin) and The VeloCities (Jude London and Paris De Silva).	
9	The Bollywood Boyz (Gurv Sihra and Harv Sihra)	28 March 2025	Legacy; Day 1	Kensington, Victoria	1	2		
10	The Parea (Gabriel Aeros and Eli Theseus)	30 March 2025	Legacy; Day 3	Wayville, South Australia	3	411		
11	The Good Brothers (Doc Gallows and Karl Anderson)	15 May 2026	WSW Rise Against; Day 1	Adelaide, South Australia	1	169		
12	United Empire (Andrade El Idolo and Henare)	30 October 2026	Megamania; Day 2	Brisbane, Queensland	1	2		
13	The Good Brothers (Doc Gallows and Karl Anderson)	1 November 2026	Megamania; Day 3	Adelaide, South Australia	2	7+		

=== Combined reigns ===
==== By team ====
As of November 7, 2026.

†	Indicates the current champion

Rank	Team	No. of reigns	Combined days
1	The Flippin Machines (Brian Cage and Flip Gordon)	1	1,361
2	The Parea (Gabriel Aeros and Eli Theseus)	3	948
3	Concrete Dongs (Concrete Davidson and Joey Ryan)	1	250
4	Villain Enterprises (Brody King and Marty Scurll)	1	209
5	WarBeard (Erick Rebeard and Matt Basso)	1	208
6	The Good Brothers (Doc Gallows and Karl Anderson)	2	175+
7	The Bollywood Boyz (Gurv Sihra and Harv Sihra)	1	2
7	The Young Bucks (Matt Jackson and Nick Jackson)	1	2
9	United Empire {{smallAndrade El Idolo and Henare}}	1	1
9	Frankie Kazarian and Eric Young	1	1

==== By wrestler ====
Rank	Wrestler	No. of reigns	Combined days
1	Brian Cage	1	1,361
1	Flip Gordon	1	1,361
3	Gabriel Aeros	3	948
3	Eli Theseus	3	948
5	Concrete Davidson	1	250
5	Joey Ryan	1	250
7	Brody King	1	209
7	Marty Scurll	1	209
9	Erick Rebeard	1	208
9	Matt Basso	1	208
11	Karl Anderson	2	175+
11	Doc Gallows	2	175+
13	Gurv Sihra	1	2
13	Harv Sihra	1	2
13	Matt Jackson	1	2
13	Nick Jackson	1	2
17	Andrade El Idolo	1	1
17	Henare	1	1
17	Frankie Kazarian	1	1
17	Eric Young	1	1

=== WSW Women's Championship ===
The WSW Women's Championship is a professional wrestling championship contested for in the women's division of World Series Wrestling.

Key
No.	Overall reign number
Reign	Reign number for the specific champion
Days	Number of days held
+	Current reign is changing daily

No.	Champion	Championship change			Reign statistics		Notes	Ref.
No.	Champion	Date	Event	Location	Reign	Days	Notes	Ref.
1	Jordynne Grace	10 March 2019	International Assault Defend & Destroy; Day 4	Hurstville, New South Wales	1	104	Defeated Shazza McKenzie and Kellyanne in the tournament final three-way match to become inaugural champion.	
2	Indi Hartwell	22 June 2019	WSW International Assault Zero Fear; Day 2	Ferntree Gully, Victoria	1	136		
—	Vacated	5 November 2019	—	—	—	—	Indi Hartwell vacated the championship after signing with WWE.	
3	Taya Valkyrie	8 July 2022	Phoenix Rising; Day 1	Adelaide, South Australia	1	3	Defeated Chelsea Green and Tenille Dashwood in a three-way match to win the vacant title.	
4	Shazza McKenzie	11 July 2022	Phoenix Rising; Day 4	Penrith, New South Wales	1	242		
5	Jordynne Grace	10 March 2023	Unleash Hell; Day 1	Ferntree Gully, Victoria	2	3		
6	Steph De Lander	13 March 2023	Unleash Hell; Day 4	Penrith, New South Wales	1	208	This was a three-way match, also involving Shazza McKenzie.	
—	Vacated	7 October 2023	—	—	—	—	The title was vacated after Steph De Lander sustained an injury.	
7	Cassie Lee	7 October 2023	Full Throttle; Day 2	Melbourne	1	254	Defeated Aysha, Harley Cameron, Jessica Troy and Lena Kross in a Gauntlet match to win the vacant title.	
—	Vacated	17 June 2024	—	—	—	—	The title was vacated due to Cassie Lee's pregnancy.	
8	Ash by Elegance	30 June 2024	Most Wanted; Day 3	Sydney	1	272	Defeated Frankie B, Lena Kross and Shazza McKenzie in a four-way match to win the vacant title.	
9	Lena Kross	29 March 2025	Legacy; Day 2	Brisbane, Queensland	1	1		
10	Ash by Elegance	30 March 2025	Legacy; Day 3	Wayville, South Australia	2	413+	This was a four-way match, also involving Jessica Troy and Santana Garrett.	

=== Combined reigns ===
†	Indicates the current champion

Rank	Wrestler	No. of reigns	Combined days
1	Ash by Elegance	3	784
2	Cassie Lee	1	254
3	Shazza McKenzie	1	242
4	Steph De Lander	1	208
5	Indi Hartwell	1	136
6	Jordynne Grace	2	107
7	Taya Valkyrie	1	3
8	Lena Kross	1	1
9	Myla Grace	1	1

=== WSW Australian Championship ===
The WSW Australian Championship is a professional wrestling championship contested for in the midcard division of World Series Wrestling.

No.	Champion	Championship change			Reign statistics		Notes	Ref.
No.	Champion	Date	Event	Location	Reign	Days	Notes	Ref.
1	TJP	12 March 2023	Unleash Hell; Day 3	Adelaide, South Australia	1	475	Defeated Bandido, Chris Basso, Effy, Flip Gordon and Joey Janela in a six-way scramble match to become inaugural champion.	
2	Shigehiro Irie	29 June 2024	Most Wanted; Day 2	Melbourne	1	273		
3	Matt Riddle	29 March 2025	WSW Legacy; Day 2	Brisbane, Queensland	1	412		
4	Dijak	15 May 2026	WSW Rise Against Day 1	Adelaide, South Australia	1	1+	Defeated Matt Riddle (c), Matt Hayter and Moose in a four way match	

== Hall of Fame ==
Year	Image	Ring name (Real name)	WSW Accolades
2023		Brian Cage (Brian Button)	One-time WSW World Heavyweight Champion and one-time WSW Tag Team Champion

== See also ==
- Professional wrestling in Australia
- List of professional wrestling organisations in Australia
