= Melbourne City Wrestling =

Australian independent professional wrestling promotion

- Melbourne City Wrestling logo
- Acronym: MCW
- Founded: 16 October 2010
- Style: Professional wrestling Lucha libre Strong style Sports entertainment
- Headquarters: Melbourne, Victoria, Australia
- Founder: Michael E. Jozis
- Owner: Hot Tag Network
- Formerly: Australian Championship Wrestling (1990s-2010)
- Website: https://mcitywrestling.com.au/

Melbourne City Wrestling is an Australian independent professional wrestling promotion founded in 2010, in Melbourne, Victoria, Australia.

Melbourne City Wrestling currently has two major venues that they use. MCW hosts monthly events at the Essendon Ukrainian Hall which is fondly dubbed the "MCW Arena" by their loyal following of fans. MCW also hold their super card events, which are only held a few months of the year, within the grand ballroom at the Thornbury Theatre, dubbed "the birthplace of MCW" as the first MCW event was held here.

== History ==
=== Partnerships & affiliations ===
==== Promotion partnerships ====
In April 2018, Progress Wrestling co-promoted a show with Australian independent professional wrestling promotions Explosive Pro Wrestling, Melbourne City Wrestling and Pro Wrestling Australia. In June 2019, Melbourne City Wrestling held the cross-promotional event, Southern Rumble 2019, in partnership with Southern Pro Wrestling (SPW) in Invercargill, New Zealand

==== Training affiliation ====
During Progress x Melbourne City Wrestling show on 20 April 2018, Melbourne City Wrestling announced the launch of their own training academy.

== Championships and accomplishments ==
=== Current championships ===
Championship	Current Champion(s)	Reign	Date won	Days held
MCW Heavyweight Championship	Robbie Thorpe	1	7 December 2025	351+
MCW Intercommonwealth Championship	Adam Brooks	5	15 March 2025	575+
MCW Tag Team Championship	Mitch Waterman and Ryan Rapid	1	5 July 2025	463+
MCW Women's Championship	Erika Reid	2	30 August 2025	407+

=== Other accomplishments ===
Accomplishment	Latest winner(s)	Date won	Location	Event	Notes
Ballroom Brawl	Robbie Thorpe	05 July 2025	Melbourne, Vic. (Thornbury Theatre)	Ballroom Brawl	(Note: Past winners: Danny Psycho (2012); Carlo Cannon (2013); Elliot Sexton (2014); Tommy Hellfire (2015); Mr Juicy (2016); Jonah Rock (2017); JXT (2018); Adam Brooks (2019); Mitch Waterman (2021); Buddy Matthews (2022); Slex (2023);Ricky South(2024).)
Jenny & Vera Memorial Cup	Kellyanne	28 April 2017	Melbourne, Vic. (Thornbury Theatre)	Clash Of The Titans	Defeated Evie in the tournament final. (Note: Past winners: KC Cassidy (2014).)
Invitational Tournament	Steph De Lander	12 October 2019	Melbourne, Vic. (Thornbury Theatre)	MCW NINE - Night 2	Defeated Kellyanne in the tournament final. Also became the first MCW Women's Champion. (Note: Past winners: Marty Scurll (2016), Dowie James (2017).)

- The list of Melbourne City Wrestling (MCW) Triple Crown winners can be found here.

== Roster ==
MCW wrestlers are freelance competitors, meaning they appear for multiple promotions either nationwide or worldwide as well as performing for Melbourne City Wrestling. The current roster are wrestlers who have appeared on the three most recent MCW shows, barring any who have announced they have left the promotion, while the list of alumni and notable guests is of wrestlers who have competed at MCW events in the past.

- Adam Brooks
- Anth Cava
- Caveman Ugg
- Edward Dusk
- Emman The Kid
- Gore
- Jake Andrewartha
- Jessica Troy
- Mitch Waterman
- Mikey Broderick
- Nick Bury
- Robbie Eagles
- Rocky Menero
- Royce Chambers
- Slex
- Skylar Cruize
- Stevie Filip
- Tome Filip
- Tony Villani
- Tyson Baxter

Broadcast team

- Lindsay Howarth
  (Commentator)
- Lord Andy Coyne
  (Commentator & Ring Announcer)
- Sebastian Walker
  (Commentator)

== Media ==
=== DVD releases ===
Select events are made available for purchase on DVD from Melbourne City Wrestling Online Shop.

=== Video on demand ===
In early 2014, Melbourne City Wrestling launched "MCW Encore: Video On Demand" on Vimeo, which includes MCW events held between 2010 and 2017, as well as some documentaries. The majority of the back catalogue of events are available for a monthly subscription fee, or events can be purchased individually.

On 25 January 2018, Melbourne City Wrestling launched "MCW Encore: Video On Demand" on Pivotshare.

== See also ==
- Professional wrestling in Australia
- List of professional wrestling organisations in Australia
