= Buddy Matthews =

Australian professional wrestler (born 1988)

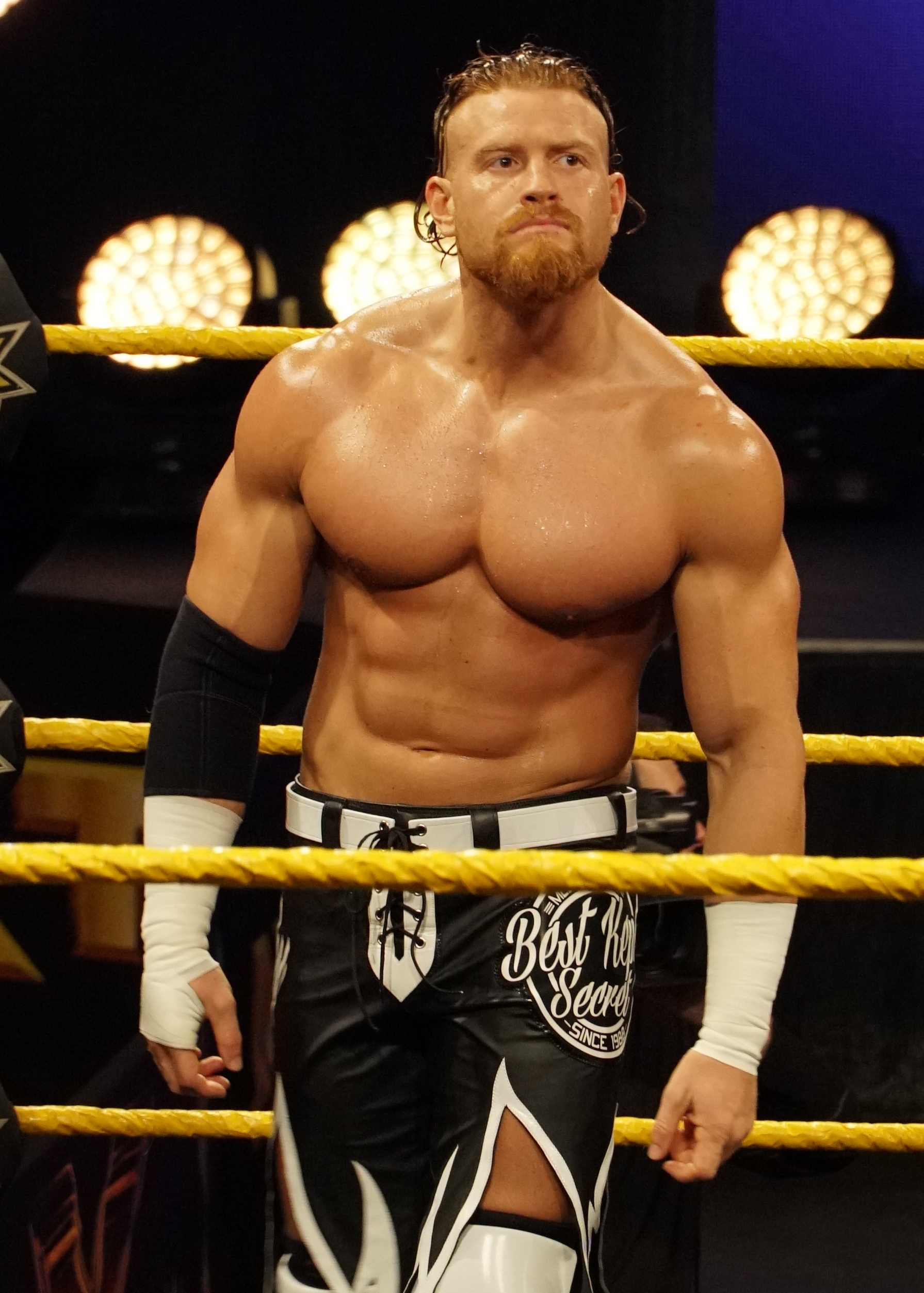
- Matthews in 2018

Personal information
- Born: Matthew Adams; 26 September 1988 (age 38) Melbourne, Victoria, Australia
- Spouse: Rhea Ripley (m. 2024)

Professional wrestling career
- Ring name(s): Buddy Matthews; Buddy Murphy; Matt Silva; Murphy
- Billed height: 5 ft 11 in (180 cm)
- Billed weight: 225 lb (102 kg)
- Billed from: Melbourne, Australia
- Trained by: Carlo Cannon; WWE Performance Center
- Debut: 8 September 2007

Matthew Adams (born 26 September 1988) is an Australian professional wrestler. He is signed to All Elite Wrestling (AEW), where he performs under the ring name Buddy Matthews and is a former AEW World Trios Champion. He also makes appearances on the independent circuit. He is best known for his time with WWE where he performed under the ring name Buddy Murphy (later shortened to Murphy).

Prior to joining WWE, Adams wrestled primarily in his native Australia under the ring name Matt Silva, appearing with promotions such as Professional Championship Wrestling (PCW) and Melbourne City Wrestling (MCW). In 2013, he relocated to the United States to work for WWE, starting out in its developmental territory NXT. During his time in NXT, he formed a tag team with Wesley Blake that won the NXT Tag Team Championship on one occasion, making him the first Australian national to win a championship in WWE. In 2018, Adams was moved to WWE's main roster, appearing on 205 Live; he won the WWE Cruiserweight Championship later that year. He was moved to SmackDown in April 2019 and then to Raw in October 2019, where he aligned himself with Seth Rollins, leading to the duo winning the WWE Raw Tag Team Championship. Adams was released from WWE in June 2021, and subsequently started wrestling for New Japan Pro-Wrestling and Major League Wrestling as "Buddy Matthews". He then made his debut for All Elite Wrestling in February 2022.

== Early life ==
Matthew Adams was born on 26 September 1988 in Melbourne, Victoria. He attended Berwick Secondary College, where he graduated in 2006.

== Professional wrestling career ==
=== Early career (2007–2013) ===
Adams was trained by Carlo Cannon. He made his debut on 8 September 2007 as "Matt Silva", at Professional Championship Wrestling (PCW), where he teamed with Jacko Lantern to defeat Adam Brooks and Diaz. He won the PCW State Championship by defeating Danny Psycho on 3 December 2010. He was also a mainstay in Melbourne City Wrestling (MCW), where he won the MCW World Heavyweight Championship by defeating Slex on 28 January 2012. He held the championship for 293 days.

=== WWE (2013–2021) ===
==== Blake and Murphy (2013–2017) ====
On 17 March 2013, Adams signed a developmental contract with WWE and was assigned to their developmental territory NXT. On 23 November, he debuted as Buddy Murphy at an NXT house show, teaming with Sawyer Fulton and Troy McClain against Angelo Dawkins, Colin Cassady, and Wesley Blake. On 15 May 2014 episode of NXT, he teamed with Elias Samson in a losing effort against The Ascension.

In August 2014, Murphy formed a tag team with Wesley Blake. On 14 August episode of NXT, they were defeated in the first round of a number one contender tag team tournament by The Lucha Dragons (Kalisto and Sin Cara). For the rest of 2014, they lost multiple matches to The Lucha Dragons and The Vaudevillains (Aiden English and Simon Gotch). Also in October 2014, they lost a number one contender tag team battle royal, being eliminated by The Ascension.

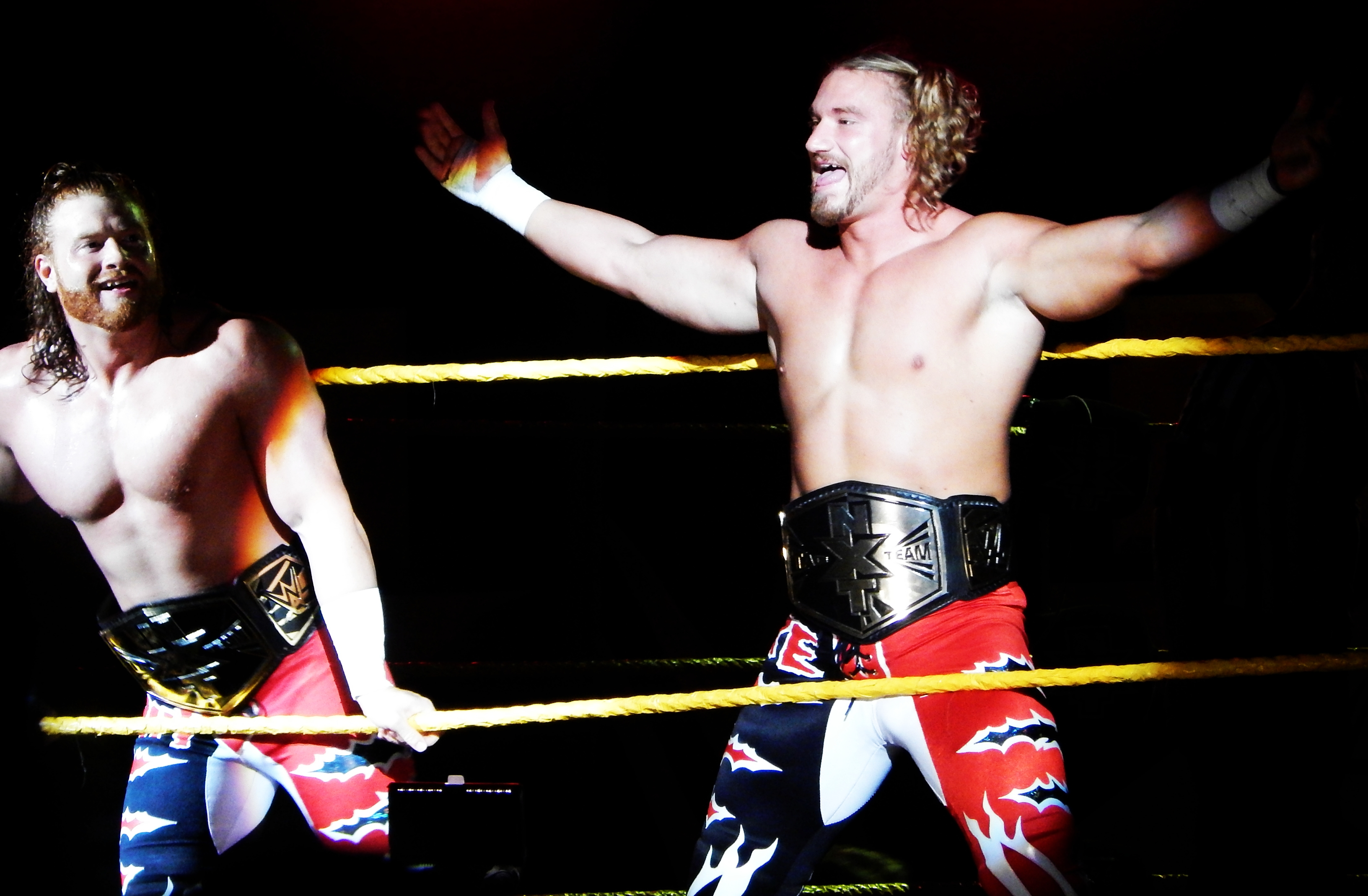
Murphy (left) and Blake as NXT Tag Team Champions in May 2015

On 21 January 2015 episode of NXT, Blake and Murphy defeated The Vaudevillains and quickly challenged The Lucha Dragons to a title match. On 28 January episode of NXT, Blake and Murphy defeated the champions to win the NXT Tag Team Championship, making Murphy the first Australian to hold a championship in WWE. At NXT TakeOver: Rival, Blake and Murphy, now billed simply by their surnames, defeated the Lucha Dragons in a rematch for the title. Following that in March, Blake and Murphy began a feud with Enzo Amore and Colin Cassady, who were intent on capturing the tag titles. Blake and Murphy attempted to woo Carmella on several occasions. On 13 May episode of NXT, Blake and Murphy distracted Carmella during her match with Alexa Bliss, causing her to lose. At NXT TakeOver: Unstoppable, during Amore and Cassady's NXT Tag Team Championship match against Blake and Murphy, Alexa Bliss came out mid-match and attacked Carmella and Amore, ensuring the win for Blake and Murphy. After making several successful title defences, Blake and Murphy lost the championships to the Vaudevillians at NXT TakeOver: Brooklyn, ending their reign at 219 days.

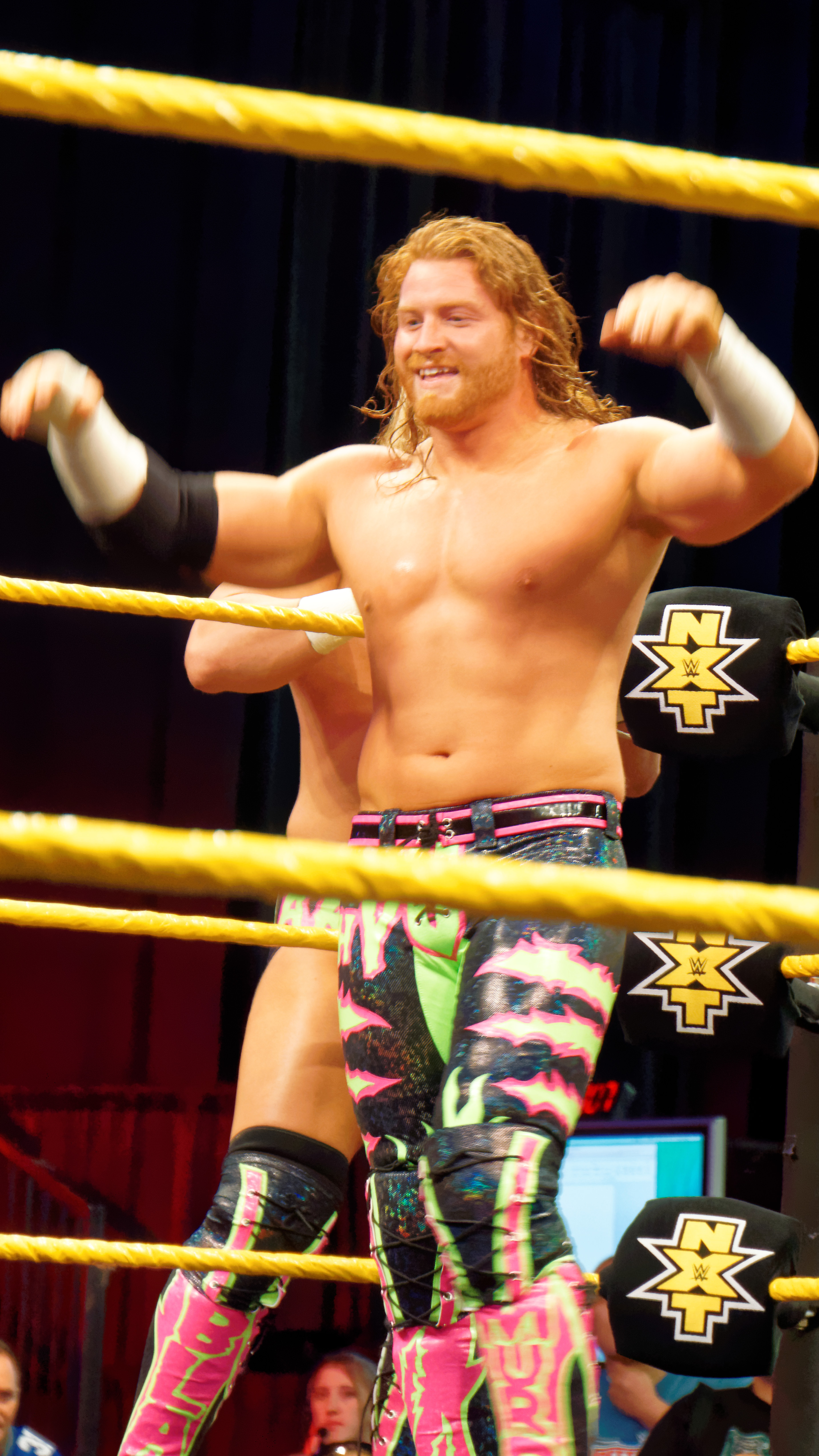
Murphy at WrestleMania 32 Axxess in 2016

On 18 May 2016 episode of NXT, after losing to Austin Aries and Shinsuke Nakamura, Bliss and then Blake walked away from Murphy, teasing a split for the team. On 1 June episode of NXT, his ring name was reverted to Buddy Murphy, where he was defeated by Tye Dillinger. On 15 June episode of NXT, Blake and Murphy reunited, but after a miscommunication between the two, they were defeated by TM-61 (Nick Miller and Shane Thorne). The following week, Murphy announced himself as a singles competitor by interrupting Shinsuke Nakamura, leading to a match with Nakamura, which Murphy lost. On 4 January 2017 episode of NXT, Murphy teamed with Tye Dillinger to defeat Bobby Roode and Elias Samson, and this turned out to be Murphy's last televised appearance in NXT, before being called up to main roster.

==== Cruiserweight Champion (2018–2019) ====
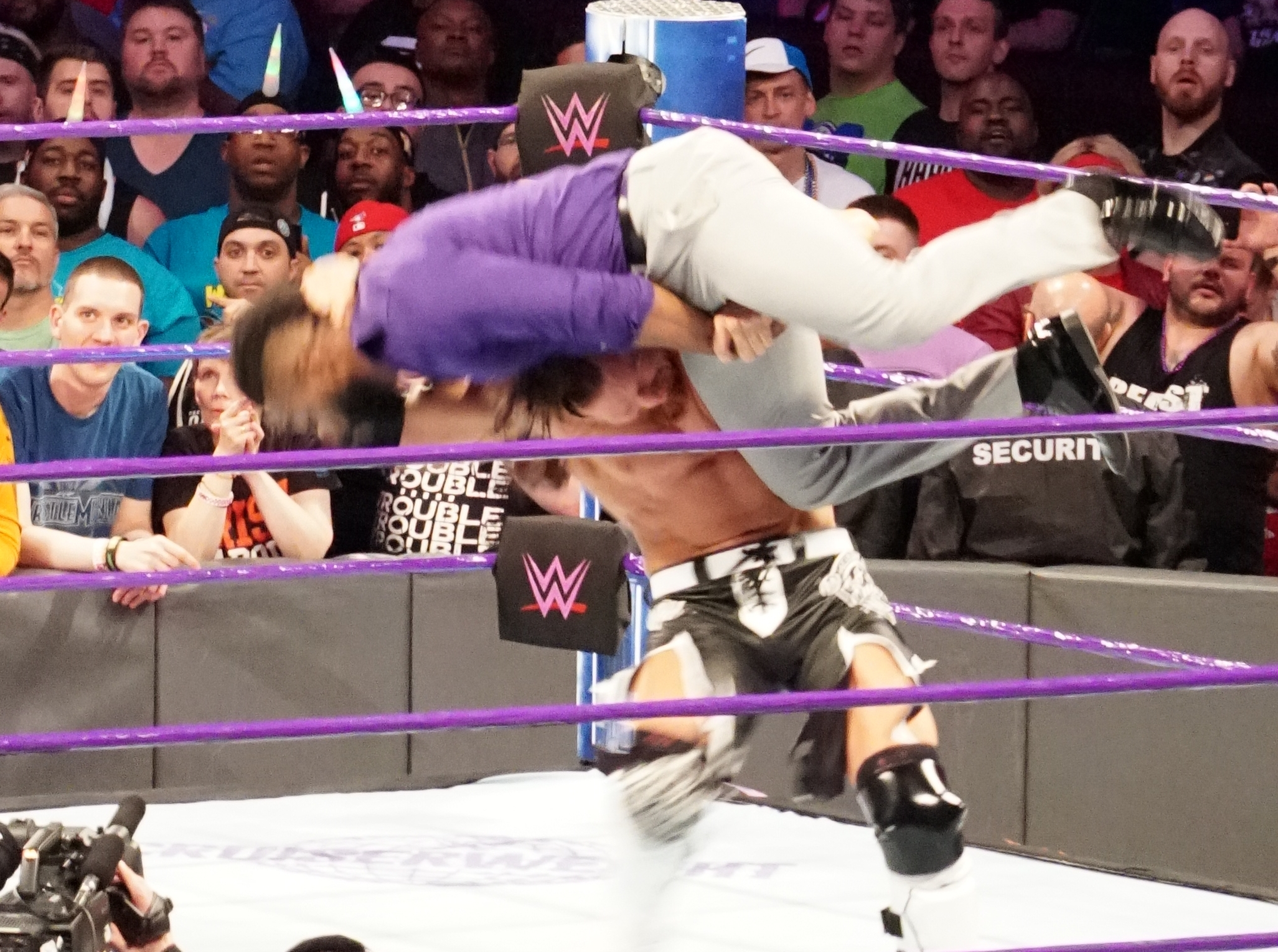
Murphy performing Murphy's Law (pumphandle Death Valley driver) on Cedric Alexander during his Cruiserweight Championship celebration in April 2018

In early 2018, Murphy lost about 25 pounds and asked to compete on the 205 Live brand. On 20 February episode of 205 Live, he made his debut as a participant in the Cruiserweight Championship tournament, defeating Ariya Daivari in the first round but lost to Mustafa Ali in the quarterfinals. On 27 March episode of 205 Live, Murphy defeated TJP, Akira Tozawa, Kalisto in a fatal four-way match for a future shot at the Cruiserweight Championship. On 10 April episode of 205 Live, Murphy attacked new WWE Cruiserweight Champion Cedric Alexander from behind, starting a feud between the two. However, Murphy failed his mandatory weigh-in and was removed from the match and the 205 Live roster until he met the weight requirement. On 8 May episode of 205 Live, Murphy defeated Ali in a rematch from their Cruiserweight Championship tournament quarterfinal match.

He started a storyline where he had to lose weight, challenging Alexander for the title on 29 May episode of 205 Live, where he failed to win the title. The following week, he had a match with Mustafa Ali that ended in a no-contest after both men were attacked by Hideo Itami, who won a triple threat match against both men the following week. On 3 July episode of 205 Live, he lost to Ali in a No Disqualification match. He then went on to form a tag team with Tony Nese and they subsequently feuded with Lucha House Party (Gran Metalik, Lince Dorado and Kalisto). On 6 October at Super Show-Down in his hometown of Melbourne, Murphy defeated Alexander to win the Cruiserweight Championship, his first singles title in WWE, the first Australian man to accomplish this feat.

Murphy subsequently retained the title against Mustafa Ali at Survivor Series and Alexander at TLC, respectively. On 27 January 2019, Murphy successfully defended his title in a fatal four-way match against Akira Tozawa, Kalisto and Hideo Itami at the Royal Rumble Kickoff Show after pinning Itami. On 17 February, Murphy retained his title against Tozawa at Elimination Chamber. At the WrestleMania 35 Kickoff Show, he lost his title to former partner Tony Nese, ending his reign at 183 days. Prior to this loss, Murphy had been undefeated in televised singles matches dating back to July 2018. On 9 April episode of 205 Live, Murphy was again defeated by Nese in a rematch for the WWE Cruiserweight Championship.

==== Brand switches (2019–2020) ====
On 16 April, Murphy was drafted to the SmackDown brand as part of the Superstar Shake-up. He participated in the 51-Man Battle Royal at Super ShowDown, but was unsuccessful. On 30 July episode of SmackDown, a stack of scaffolding fell onto Roman Reigns backstage. Murphy was shown in the background of the event. The following week, Reigns confronted Murphy about his involvement in the event. After being physically intimidated by Reigns, Murphy revealed that Rowan was Reigns' mystery attacker. At SummerSlam, Murphy defeated Apollo Crews by disqualification, after Rowan attacked him mid-match. On 19 August, Murphy was announced as one of sixteen competitors in the King of the Ring tournament. Murphy faced Mustafa Ali in the first round on 27 August episode of SmackDown Live, where he was eliminated.

On 14 October, Murphy was drafted to the Raw brand as part of the 2019 draft. Over the following weeks, Murphy developed a winning streak, defeating the likes of R-Truth, Cedric Alexander, Akira Tozawa, Matt Hardy, and Zack Ryder. He entered in a 20-man battle royal at Crown Jewel on 31 October to determine who would face AJ Styles for the United States Championship later in the night, but he failed to win. Murphy engaged in a feud with Aleister Black towards the end of 2019. However, he lost to Black at TLC: Tables, Ladders & Chairs, the 30 December episode of Raw and the 13 January 2020 episode of Raw.

==== Storyline with Seth Rollins (2020–2021) ====
Starting 2020, Murphy began to work with Seth Rollins under the character of his disciple, winning the WWE Raw Tag Team Championship. On 7 February, his ring name was shortened back to simply Murphy after he requested when WWE producer Michael Hayes told him the name Buddy sounds too friendly. Murphy and Rollins successfully defended their titles against The Street Profits at Super ShowDown on 27 February, but eventually lost the titles to them in a rematch on 2 March episode of Raw. Their reign ended at 42 days. Murphy and Rollins failed to reclaim the championship from the team at Elimination Chamber six days later.

In May, Murphy and Rollins started a feud with Rey Mysterio and his family, as well as Aleister Black. At Payback, Murphy and Rollins lost to Mysterio and his son Dominik Mysterio, after Murphy accidentally kicked Rollins, costing them the match. On 15 September episode of Raw, Rollins attacked Murphy after Murphy cost Rollins in a steel cage match against Dominik, leading to Murphy getting closer with Rey Mysterio's daughter, Aalyah. As part of the 2020 Draft in October, Murphy was drafted to the SmackDown brand. The storyline continued when after Aalyah kissed Murphy. On 13 November episode of SmackDown, Murphy turned on Rollins, thus turning him face. Murphy defeated Rollins the following week on SmackDown to end the feud. The love storyline between Murphy and Aalyah was dropped shortly after, and Murphy was taken off television. Murphy returned on 5 March 2021 episode of SmackDown, trying to reunite with Seth Rollins against Cesaro to which Rollins rebuffed. Murphy then lost a match against Cesaro. Murphy's last WWE appearance took place on 9 April 2021, WrestleMania Edition of SmackDown in the André the Giant Memorial Battle Royal having been eliminated by King Corbin. On 2 June 2021, Murphy was released from his WWE contract.

=== Independent circuit (2021–present) ===
On 11 September 2021, Murphy, now going by Buddy Matthews, made his first post-WWE appearance at Pennsylvania Premiere Wrestling (PPW), where he defeated Facade and JT Dunn in a three-way match.

In 2022, Matthews returned to Melbourne City Wrestling (MCW)a in the Ballroom Brawl event, winning the right to face Mitch Waterman for the MCW World Heavyweight Championship. Matthews then defeated Mitch Waterman to win his second MCW World Heavyweight Championship, at The House Always Wins event in 2023 before losing the title to Slex in 2024.

=== New Japan Pro-Wrestling (2021–2022) ===
On 16 October 2021, a video aired during NJPW Strong announcing that Matthews,would make his New Japan Pro-Wrestling (NJPW) debut at the Battle in the Valley event on 13 November, where he lost to Kazuchika Okada. Matthews would continue to appear on Strong in 2022, facing the likes of Ren Narita and Yuya Uemura.

=== Major League Wrestling (2022) ===
On 21 January 2022, Matthews wrestled for Major League Wrestling (MLW) at their Blood & Thunder event, losing to TJP.

=== All Elite Wrestling (2022–present) ===
On 23 February 2022, episode of Dynamite, Matthews made his debut for All Elite Wrestling (AEW), aligning himself with Malakai Black and Brody King to form the House of Black. On 6 March, at Revolution, the House of Black defeated Death Triangle (PAC, Penta Oscuro and Rey Fénix) and Erick Redbeard in a six-man tag team match. At Double or Nothing on 29 May, the House of Black defeated Death Triangle in a six-man tag team match, with Julia Hart subsequently joining the group. On 8 June, Matthews competed in a qualifying match for the newly introduced AEW All-Atlantic Championship, losing to Pac. At All Out on 4 September, the House of Black lost to Darby Allin, Miro and Sting in a six-man tag team match.

At Revolution on 5 March 2023, the House of Black defeated The Elite (Kenny Omega and The Young Bucks) to win the AEW World Trios Championship. The House of Black successfully defended the titles against The Acclaimed (Anthony Bowens, Billy Gunn, Max Caster) at Double or Nothing on 28 May and on 22 July episode of Collision. In June 2023, Matthews began a feud with Andrade El Ídolo. On 17 June episode of Collision, Matthews lost to Andrade in a singles match and in a ladder match a month later with Andrade's mask on the line. At All In on 27 August, the House of Black lost the AEW World Trios Championship to the Acclaimed, ending their reign at 175 days.

On 1 May 2024 episode of Dynamite, Matthews unsuccessfully challenged Adam Copeland for the AEW TNT Championship. On 15 June episode of Collision, the House of Black won a #1 contenders' match for The Patriarchy's AEW World Trios Championships. After the match, Patriarchy leader Christian Cage appeared on the titantron and revealed that they had attacked Matthews with a con-chair-to, turning the entire House of Black stable face for the first time. At All In on 25 August, Matthews and the House of Black competed in a four-way ladder match for the AEW World Trios Championship against the reigning champions, The Patriarchy, Bang Bang Gang, and a team consisting of Pac, Castagnoli and Wheeler Yuta with the latter team, winning the match.

On 22 January 2025 episode of Dynamite, a vignette aired of King, Matthews and Julia Hart silently kicking Black out of the group and as leader, stating "that they are done living in the shadows and that it is time to honor themselves with no leaders, no masters, no gods". On 25 January episode of Collision, the group was renamed to the "Hounds of Hell". On 15 February at Grand Slam Australia, Matthews unsuccessfully challenged Kazuchika Okada for the AEW Continental Championship. After the match, Matthews revealed that he had suffered an ankle injury during his entrance, leaving him out of action indefinitely.

== Other media ==
Adams as Buddy Murphy made his video game debut as a playable character in WWE 2K16 (as a downloadable character) and also appears in WWE 2K17, WWE 2K20 and WWE 2K22. He appeared on an episode of the reality show Total Divas in January 2018.

== Personal life ==
Adams was engaged to American professional wrestler Alexis Cabrera, better known by the ring name Alexa Bliss. It was reported that the two ended their engagement in September 2018, but still remain friends.

He later began a relationship with fellow Australian wrestler Demi Bennett, known professionally as Rhea Ripley. They married in June 2024.

Adams has a background in extreme sports, particularly bungee jumping, rock climbing, and swimming with great whales. He is a supporter of his hometown Australian rules football club, the Carlton Football Club; his WWE ring name is a reference to former Carlton midfielder Marc Murphy.

== Championships and accomplishments ==
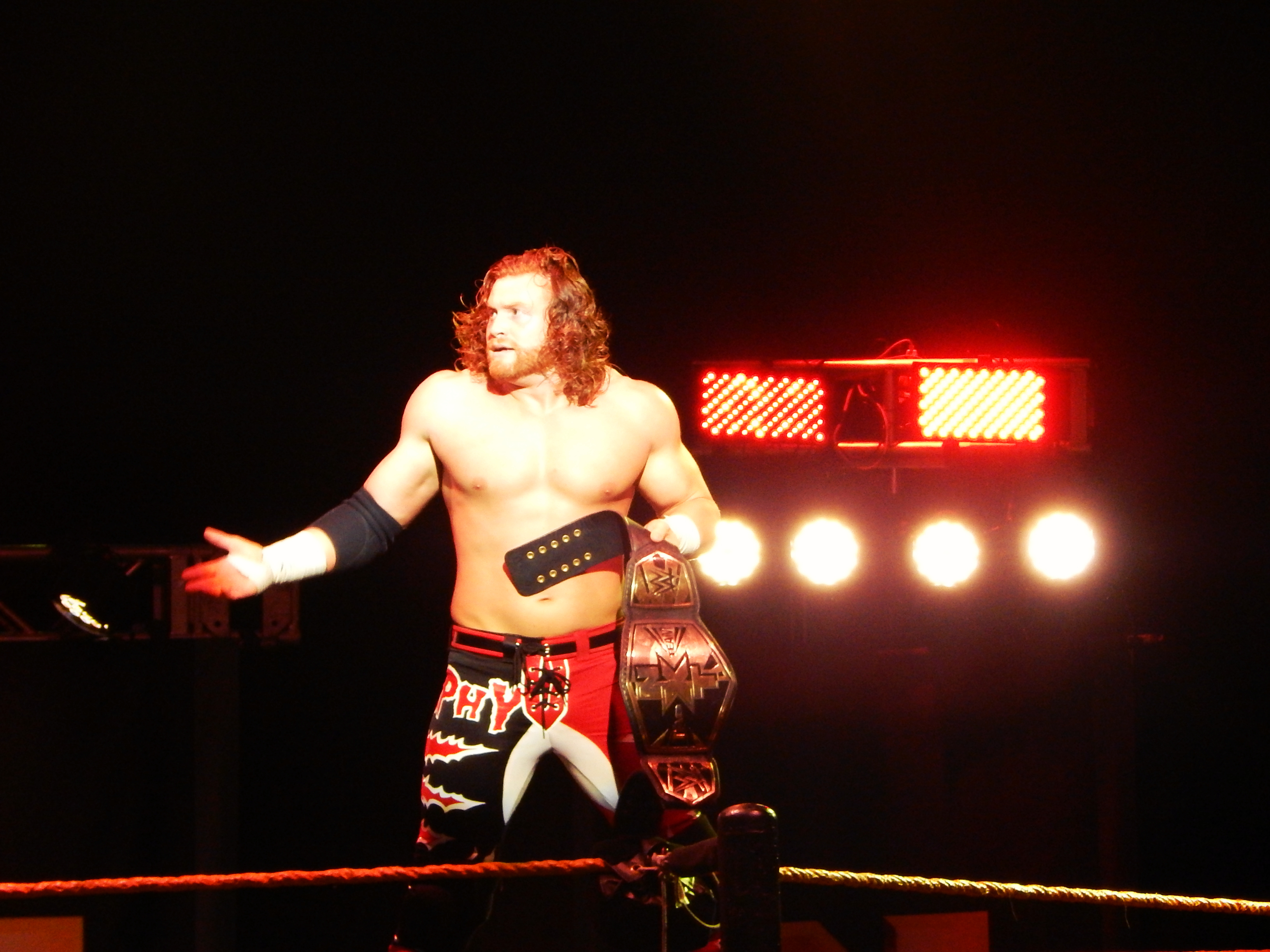
Murphy is a one-time NXT Tag Team Champion.

- All Elite Wrestling
  - AEW World Trios Championship (1 time) – with Brody King and Malakai Black
- Ballarat Pro Wrestling
  - BPW Australian Championship (1 time)
- CBS Sports
  - Breakthrough Wrestler of the Year (2018)
- Melbourne City Wrestling
  - MCW World Heavyweight Championship (2 times)
  - MCW Ballroom Brawl (2022)
- Professional Championship Wrestling
  - PCW State Championship (1 time)
- Pro Wrestling Illustrated
  - Ranked No. 33 of the top 500 singles wrestlers in the PWI 500 in 2019
- WWE
  - WWE Cruiserweight Championship (1 time)
  - WWE Raw Tag Team Championship (1 time) – with Seth Rollins
  - NXT Tag Team Championship (1 time) – with Wesley Blake/Blake
