= ACW Mischief Night =

Mischief Night
- Promotional poster for the event.
- Promotion: Awesome Championship Wrestling
- Date: October 18, 2025
- City: Poughkeepsie, New York
- Venue: MJN Convention Center
- Attendance: ~800

Pay-per-view chronology
| ← Previous; Uprising | Next → Pougkeepsie Rumble |

chronology
| ← Previous; ACW 52W HARDWAY - Tag 2 | Next → — |

ACW Mischief Night was a live professional wrestling event held on October 18, 2025 by the American wrestling promotion Awesome Championship Wrestling. It was the promotion's fifth streamed event, airing on Triller TV and, held at the MJN Convention Center in Poughkeepsie, New York.

The nine-match card featured four bouts for ACW championships and saw two title changes. The main event was a Fatal Four-Way elimination match between ACW Heavyweight Champion Richard Holliday, Matt Cardona, Nic Nemeth, and Matt Riddle. Cardona would defeat Holliday and end a 287-day reign, becoming the second Heavyweight Champion for the promotion.

== Production ==
=== Background ===
The event was semi-Halloween themed, with the venue playing Halloween music and its promotional material featuring the laughter of Vincent Price.

=== Storylines ===
The event featured professional wrestling matches that involved different wrestlers from ongoing scripted feuds and storylines. Wrestlers portrayed villains (heels), heroes (faces), or tweeners in scripted matches that culminate in front of an audience.

The ACW Tag Team Championship would be contested for in a ladder match between The Now (Hale Collins & Vik Dalishus) and their rivals Sent2Slaughter (Danny Maff & Shawn Donavan). It would be the first ladder match for the tag team titles.

The main event would feature an elimination match. "Fed Killer" Richard Holliday and "Rude Dude" Matt Riddle would portray heels while the "Wanted Man" Nic Nemeth and Matt Cardona were babyfaces. Holliday's Fed Killer gimmick saw him seek to hit his finishing move on "members of the Fed," meaning former WWE wrestlers. Riddle had previously defeated Holliday for the championship at ACW Fallout, however the result was overturned as a result of a disqualification after a referee (who had been knocked out of the match) called a low-blow from Holliday. Following the match, Matt Cardona appeared on the TitanTron and challenged Holiday to a rematch, after the two previously wrestled for the belt at Aftershock. Nic Nemeth also entered himself into the match for the championship in a video promo, setting up a Fatal Four-Way Match

== Event ==
=== Preliminary matches ===
The first match on the card was a championship match for the ACW National Championship between its inaugural champion Real1 and Ben Bishop. Real1 had defeated Bishop, along with two other men, in the first match to determine the champion, and this was their first rematch for the title since.

=== Main event match ===
The main event of the show was a Fatal Four-Way elimination match between Matt Cardona, Matt Riddle, Nic Nemeth, and Richard Holliday (c). Matt Cardona would be taken out early into the match, as during his entrance, Holliday would sneak him with his low-blow finisher and deliver a beatdown in the corner of the ring. Holliday would work Cardona's knee and continue the attack until prevented by a swarm of referees, who would evacuate Cardona to the back. Nemeth was the second competitor to enter, followed by Matt Riddle. After the bell rang, a temporary alliance would form between Nemeth and Riddle to attack Holliday, which sent him outside of the ring. The two then shook hands and proceeded to wrestle, a re-match of their bout at the Poughkeepsie Rumble.

== Results ==
| No, | Results | Stipulations |
|---|---|---|
| 1 | Real1 (c) defeats Ben Bishop (6:52) | ACW National Championship singles match |
| 2 | The Righteous (Dutch & Vincent) defeat The Audacity (Micah Cortez & Seth Cortez) (8:06) | Tag team match |
| 3 | Dante Casanova defeats AJZ and Sidney Akeem (7:30) | Triple threat match |
| 5 | Parker Boudreaux defeats Buddy Tomas and Ricky Pryce and Yoscifer El (6:31) | Gauntlet Match |
| 6 | Danny Doring & Zack Clayton (w/Little Guido) defeat Crowbar & Tommy Dreamer (w/Vanessa) (11:09) | Tag team match |
| 7 | Indi Hartwell (c) defeats Tasha Steelz (6:57) | ACW Women's Championship singles match |
| 8 | Mike Santana defeats Brian Myers (7:31) | singles match |
| 9 | The NOW (Hale Collins & Vik Dalishus) defeat Sent2Slaughter (Danny Maff & Shawn Donavan) (c) (19:33) | ACW Tag Team Title Ladder Match |
| 10 | Matt Cardona defeats Richard Holliday (c) and Matt Riddle and Nic Nemeth (13:14) | ACW Heavyweight Title Four Way Elimination Match |
