= ACW Tag Team Championship =

ACW Tag Team Championship may refer to:

- ACW Tag Team Championship (Awesome), a championship in Awesome Championship Wrestling since 2025
- ACW Tag Team Championship (Assault), a championship in Assault Championship Wrestling from 2001 to 2004
