= ACW Championship =

ACW Championship may refer to:

- ACW World Heavyweight Championship (2024-), a men's professional championship in Awesome Championship Wrestling
- ACW Heavyweight Championship (2001-2004), a men's professional championship in Assault Championship Wrestling
