= Steph De Lander =

Australian professional wrestler (born 1997)

- De Lander at Death Before Dishonor 2026

Personal information
- Born: Stephanie Josephine De Landre; 21 January 1997 (age 29) Melbourne, Victoria, Australia
- Spouse: Mance Warner (m. 2025)

Professional wrestling career
- Ring names: FaceBrooke; Steph De Lander; Persia Pirotta
- Billed height: 5 ft 11 in (180 cm)
- Billed weight: 187 lb (85 kg)
- Billed from: Sydney, Australia
- Trained by: Madison Eagles; Robbie Eagles; Mick Moretti
- Debut: 8 April 2017

Stephanie Josephine De Landre (born 21 January 1997), better known under the ring name Steph De Lander, is an Australian professional wrestler. She is best known for her time in Total Nonstop Action Wrestling (TNA), where she is a former as well as the final TNA Digital Media Champion. She is also a mainstay on the American independent scene, most notably in Game Changer Wrestling (GCW). She is currently the ACW Women's Champion in the Poughkeepsie-based promotion Awesome Championship Wrestling. She is also known for her time in WWE, where she performed on the NXT 2.0 brand under the ring name Persia Pirotta. She has also made appearances for All Elite Wrestling (AEW) and Ring of Honor (ROH) in recent years.

== Early life ==
Stephanie Josephine De Landre was born in Melbourne, Victoria, and moved to Sydney, New South Wales when she was 5 years old. She grew up in the northern suburbs of Avalon Beach. De Landre dropped out of high school at 15 years old to become a hairdresser, before deciding to pursue professional wrestling at age 18.

== Professional wrestling career ==
=== Early career (2015–2021) ===
In 2015, De Landre began training at the PWA Academy in Sydney, under coaches Madison Eagles, Robbie Eagles and Mick Moretti. In 2017 she debuted as a masked character named FaceBrooke, and quickly rose through the ranks in the Australian independent scene. As FaceBrooke, she wrestled for NHPW in Perth, and made appearances for multiple promotions across Australia such as BCW, PCW, Wrestling GO, PWA, Rock n Roll Wrestling, Newcastle Pro Wrestling & PWA.

IN 2018, FaceBrooke made her American debut for acclaimed all women's promotion Shimmer Women Athletes. She also performed for RISE, Nova Pro Wrestling & IWA Midsouth during this tour, competing against wrestlers such as Shotzi Blackheart, Veda Scott, Allie Katch & more.

After returning to Australia, she was sidelined for almost a year due to a shoulder injury. Upon returning to the ring in 2019, she stopped going by FaceBrooke and adopted the Python Powerhouse gimmick, and started going by her real name, stylized as "Steph De Lander". She continued to appear in various promotions across Australia, such as Melbourne City Wrestling and Venom Pro Wrestling .

In 2019, De Lander returned to the US for another tour, making appearances for SHIMMER this time tagging alongside Indi Hartwell as 'Australia's Hottest Commodities'. They tagged against names like Jessica Havoc & Nevaeh. Steph debuted for Black Label Pro & Battleclub Pro during this trip.

De Lander continued to rise up the ranks in the Australian wrestling scene, competing in high-profile matches at top promotions PWA & MCW. In August 2019, she defeated Indi Hartwell in her farewell match in Australia, before Hartwell moved to the United States to join WWE. At MCW Endgame in September 2019, De Lander lasted 3 rounds in a tournament where she defeated Kellyanne to become the inaugural MCW Women's Champion. In February 2020, she competed in a cage match in the main event of PWA against Jessica Troy.

=== WWE (2021–2022) ===
In June 2019, De Landre participated in the first ever all Women's WWE tryout in the United Kingdom. She was the only international talent at the tryout, with all the other women being from the UK. De Landre has since revealed in interviews she was offered a contract with WWE during this tryout.

It was reported on 14 March 2021 that De Landre was one of two Australian wrestlers signed by WWE. Under the ring name "Persia Pirotta", she made her NXT debut as the close friend of Indi Hartwell who had come all the way from Australia for Hartwell's wedding with Dexter Lumis. On 26 October during the NXT: Halloween Havoc television special, Pirotta and Hartwell teamed again to compete in a Triple Threat Scareway To Hell Ladder match against Toxic Attraction (Gigi Dolin and Jacy Jayne) and the reigning NXT Women's Tag Team Champions Io Shirai and Zoey Stark, establishing herself as a face in the process. She had her first victory in WWE on 16 November episode of NXT, defeating Gabby Stephens and Jenny Levy in a two-on-one handicap match.

After she returned in January 2022, Pirotta and Hartwell started a feud with Toxic Attraction which resulted in a match for women's tag team titles at Vengeance Day where they were unsuccessful in winning the match.

During their match on March 14, 2022, where Pirotta, aided by her partner and lover Duke Hudson, lost to Indi Hartwell and her partner and lover Dexter Lumis. After the match ended, the two couples proceeded to have a kissing contest, embracing their partners. This controversial angle was featured on popular media news site TMZ on March 16, 2022, for its PG-13 content during the PG era of WWE NXT. Another article was released the same day featuring photos of Pirotta and Hartwell posing in bikinis for the media site Hot Shots. Pirotta was released by WWE in April 2022.

=== Impact Wrestling/Total Nonstop Action Wrestling (2023–2026) ===
In February 2023, De Landre made her debut for Impact Wrestling as Steph De Lander. In her debut match, on 9 February episode of Impact!, she established herself as a heel and faced Jordynne Grace in a losing effort.

On the March 28 TNA Impact!, De Lander returned to TNA and, with help from an also returning Matt Cardona, with whom she has been aligning herself with in the independent circuit, won an 8-4-1 match to become number one contender to Jordynne Grace's TNA Knockouts World Championship at Rebellion. At the event, De Lander was defeated by Grace.

On the September 7 episode of Impact, De Lander, now competing as a face during her current on-screen relationship with PCO, confronted Cardona about his actions. There, Cardona revealed that when he and De Lander teamed up over two years ago, De Lander had signed a contract with Cardona that lent her services to him in exchange for several benefits, which he claims effectively made her his "property". At Victory Road on September 13, De Lander revealed she needed neck surgery.

De Lander made her return from injury on the January 23, 2025 episode of Impact, confronting Sami Callihan, while holding the TNA Digital Media Championship, claiming to be the "23" who has been tormenting the latter, and to have won the championship "in a divorce", where in storyline, she divorced her on-screen husband PCO and won custody of the championship in the process, which was to explain the situation where PCO's contract in real life was not renewed by TNA and he attempted to destroy the title at a Game Changer Wrestling event earlier that week instead of appearing to drop the belt in his last contractual date for TNA. Her real-life fiance Mance Warner would make his TNA debut, attacking Callihan and aligning himself with De Lander, turning De Lander heel. De Lander would hold the Digital Media Championship for two months, before Director of Authority Santino Marella deactivated the title, and held a tournament to crown the inaugural TNA International Champion. On March 4, 2026, it was reported that both De Lander and Warner had left TNA due to the promotion refusing to medically clear De Lander.

== Personal life ==
De Landre is of Maltese descent. She came out as bisexual in 2019, and married American professional wrestler Mance Warner in October 2025.

== Championships and accomplishments ==
- Awesome Championship Wrestling
  - ACW Women's Championship (1 time, current)
- Melbourne City Wrestling
  - MCW Women's Championship (1 time, inaugural)
  - MCW Women's Championship Invitational Tournament (2019)
- Newcastle Pro Wrestling
  - Newy Pro Women's Championship (1 time)
  - Newy Pro Invictus Tournament Winner (2020)
- Premier Streaming Network
  - Premier Women's World Championship (1 time, final)
- Total Nonstop Action Wrestling
  - TNA Digital Media Championship (1 time, final)
- Venom Pro Wrestling
  - VPW Women's Championship (1 time)
- World Series Wrestling
  - WSW Women's Championship (1 time)
- Other titles
  - Women's Internet Championship (1 time, inaugural, current)
