= ACW =

ACW may refer to:

== Military ==
- American Civil War
- Air Control Wing, e.g.:
  - 116th Air Control Wing
  - 461st Air Control Wing
  - 552d Air Control Wing

== Other ==
- Acorn Cambridge Workstation, a microcomputer
- Ancient Christian Writers, a book series
- Anticlockwise
- Arts Council of Wales
- Ashfield–Colborne–Wawanosh, a municipality in Ontario, Canada
- Assault Championship Wrestling (2000-2004, 2008)
- Awesome Championship Wrestling (2024-Present)
- Hejazi Arabic, a language dialect (ISO 639-3 code ACW)
