= List of NXT Women's Champions =

The NXT Women's Championship is a women's professional wrestling championship created and promoted by the American professional wrestling promotion WWE on the NXT brand. The championship is generally contested in professional wrestling matches, in which participants execute scripted finishes rather than contend in direct competition. The inaugural champion was Paige, who won the title on NXT on June 20, 2013. Kelani Jordan is the current champion in her first reign. She won the title by defeating Kendal Grey at Heatwave on August 30, 2026, in Edinburg, Texas.

As of November 15, 2026, overall, there have been 28 reigns between 24 champions and three vacancies. Charlotte Flair, Shayna Baszler, Roxanne Perez, and Jacy Jayne are tied for the most reigns at two. Asuka is the longest reigning champion at 510 days, beginning on April 1, 2016, and ending on August 24, 2017; however, WWE recognizes the reign as 522 days, with it ending on September 6, 2017, the date the episode in which she vacated the title aired on tape delay. Tatum Paxley has the shortest reign at 24 days. Paige is the youngest champion, winning it at the age of 20, while Shayna Baszler is the oldest, winning the championship at 38. Only three women have held the title for a continuous reign of one year (365 days) or more: Asuka, Shayna Baszler, and Mandy Rose.

== Title history ==
Key
No.	Overall reign number
Reign	Reign number for the specific champion
Days	Number of days held
Days recog.	Number of days held recognized by the promotion
+	Current reign is changing daily

No.	Champion	Championship change			Reign statistics			Notes	Ref.
No.	Champion	Date	Event	Location	Reign	Days	Days recog.	Notes	Ref.
WWE: NXT
1	Paige	June 20, 2013	NXT	Winter Park, FL	1	308	273	Defeated Emma in the finals of an eight-woman single-elimination tournament to become the inaugural champion. WWE recognizes Paige's reign as beginning on July 24, 2013, when the episode aired on tape delay.	
—	Vacated	April 24, 2014	NXT	Baltimore, MD	—	—	—	NXT General Manager John "Bradshaw" Layfield stripped Paige of the title when she moved on to the main roster after winning the WWE Divas Championship.	
2	Charlotte	May 29, 2014	TakeOver	Winter Park, FL	1	258	258	Defeated Natalya in the finals of an eight-woman single-elimination tournament to win the vacant championship.	
3	Sasha Banks	February 11, 2015	TakeOver: Rival	Winter Park, FL	1	192	191	This was a fatal four-way match, also involving Bayley and Becky Lynch.	
4	Bayley	August 22, 2015	TakeOver: Brooklyn	Brooklyn, NY	1	223	223		
5	Asuka	April 1, 2016	TakeOver: Dallas	Dallas, TX	1	510	522	WWE recognizes Asuka's reign as ending on September 6, 2017, when the following episode aired on tape delay.	
—	Vacated	August 24, 2017	NXT	Winter Park, FL	—	—	—	After suffering a collarbone injury at TakeOver: Brooklyn III, Asuka relinquished the title. Aired on tape delay on September 6, 2017.	
6	Ember Moon	November 18, 2017	TakeOver: WarGames	Houston, TX	1	140	139	Defeated Kairi Sane, Nikki Cross, and Peyton Royce in a fatal four-way match to win the vacant championship.	
7	Shayna Baszler	April 7, 2018	TakeOver: New Orleans	New Orleans, LA	1	133	132		
8	Kairi Sane	August 18, 2018	TakeOver: Brooklyn 4	Brooklyn, NY	1	71	71		
9	Shayna Baszler	October 28, 2018	Evolution	Uniondale, NY	2	416	416		
10	Rhea Ripley	December 18, 2019	NXT	Winter Park, FL	1	98–99	108	WWE recognizes Ripley's reign as ending on April 5, 2020, when the following match aired on tape delay.	
11	Charlotte Flair	March 25–26, 2020	WrestleMania 36; Part 2	Orlando, FL	2	73–74	63	Formerly known as just Charlotte. WrestleMania was taped on March 25 and 26, but it is unknown which day this match was taped. WWE recognizes Flair's reign as beginning on April 5, 2020, when the match aired on tape delay.	
12	Io Shirai	June 7, 2020	TakeOver: In Your House	Winter Park, FL	1	304	304	This was a triple threat match, also involving Rhea Ripley, who Shirai pinned to win the title.	
13	Raquel González	April 7, 2021	TakeOver: Stand & Deliver; Night 1	Orlando, FL	1	202	201		
14	Mandy Rose	October 26, 2021	NXT 2.0: Halloween Havoc	Orlando, FL	1	413	413	This was a Trick or Street Fight match. On September 4, 2022, at Worlds Collide, Rose defeated Meiko Satomura and Blair Davenport in a triple threat match to unify the NXT UK Women's Championship into the NXT Women's Championship. The NXT UK Women's Championship was retired with Rose going forward as the unified NXT Women's Champion.	
15	Roxanne Perez	December 13, 2022	NXT	Orlando, FL	1	109	108		
16	Indi Hartwell	April 1, 2023	Stand & Deliver	Los Angeles, CA	1	31	31	This was a six-way ladder match also involving Gigi Dolin, Lyra Valkyria, Tiffany Stratton, and Zoey Stark. As a result of the 2023 WWE Draft, Hartwell was drafted to Raw.	
—	Vacated	May 2, 2023	NXT	Orlando, FL	—	—	—	Indi Hartwell relinquished the title as she was drafted to Raw in the 2023 WWE Draft and also due to a foot injury.	
17	Tiffany Stratton	May 28, 2023	Battleground	Lowell, MA	1	107	107	Defeated Lyra Valkyria in the finals of an eight-woman single-elimination tournament to win the vacant championship.	
18	Becky Lynch	September 12, 2023	NXT	Orlando, FL	1	42	42		
19	Lyra Valkyria	October 24, 2023	NXT: Halloween Havoc; Night 1	Orlando, FL	1	165	164		
20	Roxanne Perez	April 6, 2024	Stand & Deliver	Philadelphia, PA	2	276	276		
21	Giulia	January 7, 2025	NXT: New Year's Evil	Los Angeles, CA	1	63	63		
22	Stephanie Vaquer	March 11, 2025	NXT: Roadblock	New York, NY	1	77	77	This was a Winner Takes All match in which Vaquer defended the NXT Women's North American Championship.	
23	Jacy Jayne	May 27, 2025	NXT	Orlando, FL	1	151	150		
24	Tatum Paxley	October 25, 2025	Halloween Havoc	Prescott Valley, AZ	1	24	24		
25	Jacy Jayne	November 18, 2025	NXT: Gold Rush; Night 1	New York, NY	2	137	136		
26	Lola Vice	April 4, 2026	Stand & Deliver	Chesterfield, MO	1	85	85	This was a triple threat match also involving Kendal Grey.	
27	Kendal Grey	June 28, 2026	The Great American Bash	Orlando, FL	1	63	62		
28	Kelani Jordan	August 30, 2026	Heatwave	Edinburg, TX	1	77+	77+		

== Combined reigns ==
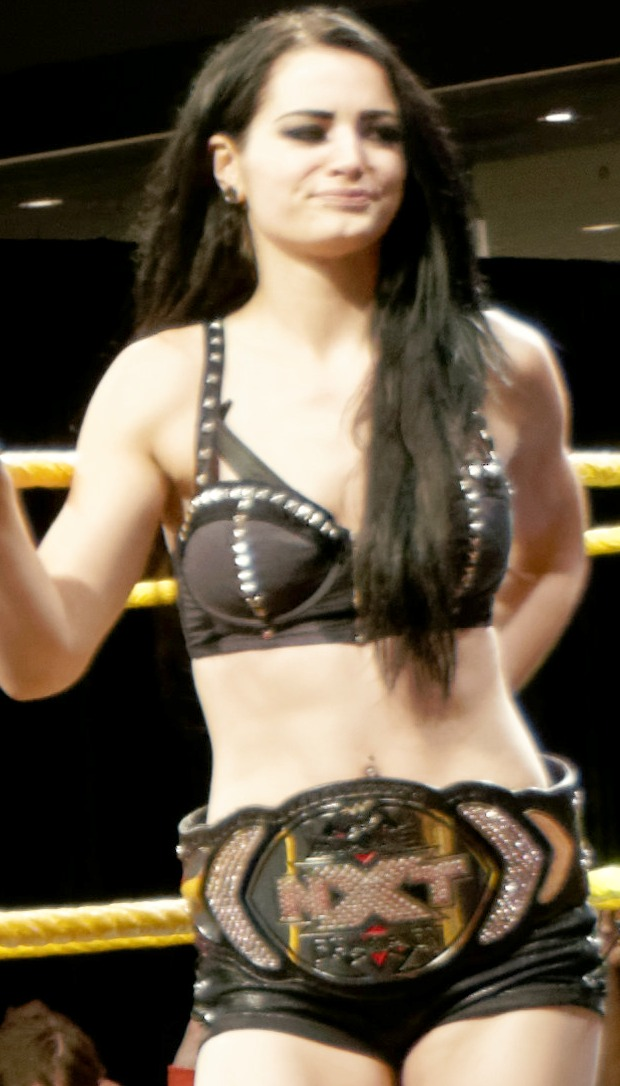
The inaugural and youngest champion Paige

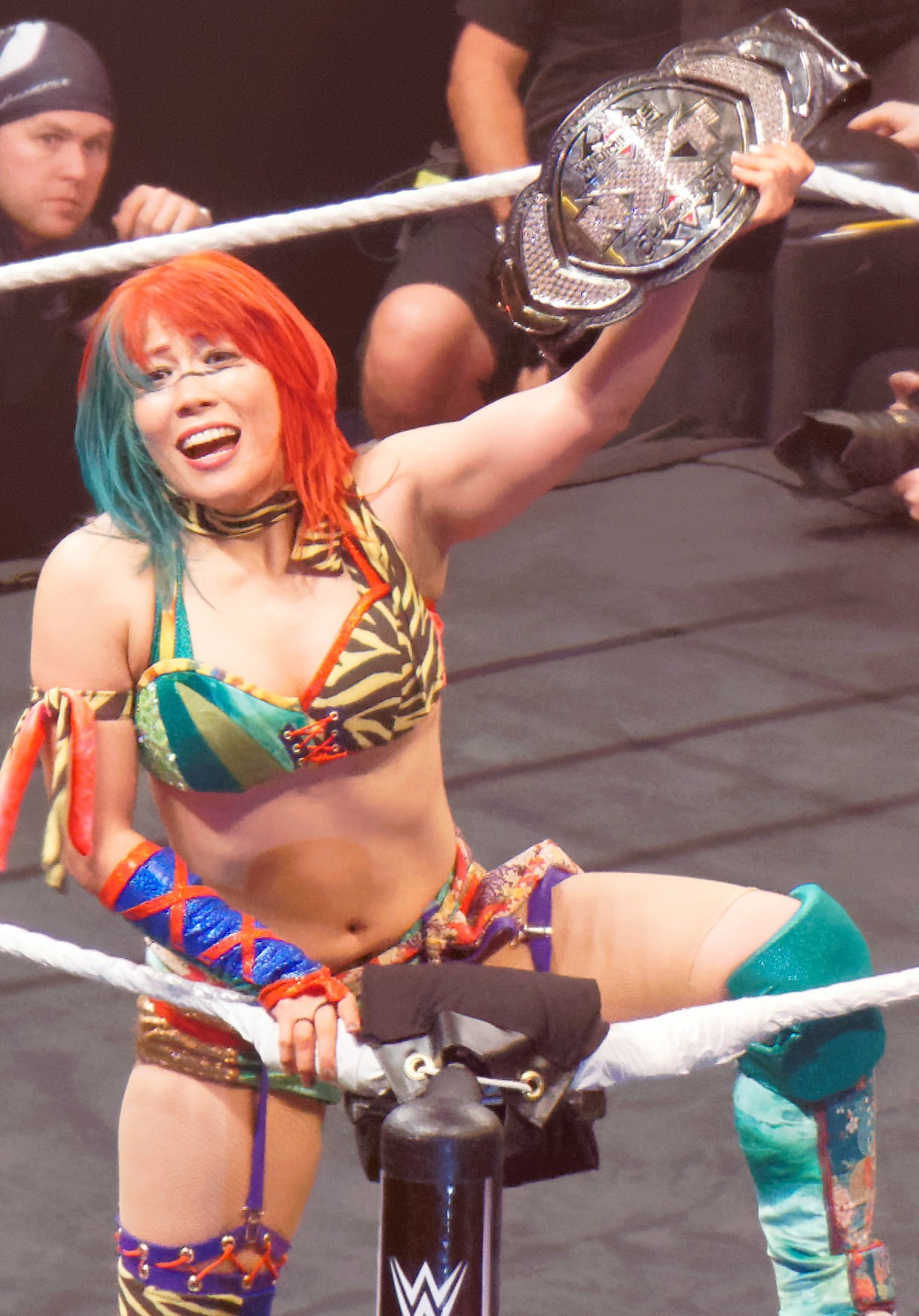
One-time and longest-reigning champion Asuka, her singular reign lasted 510 days (522 days as recognized by WWE due to tape delay)

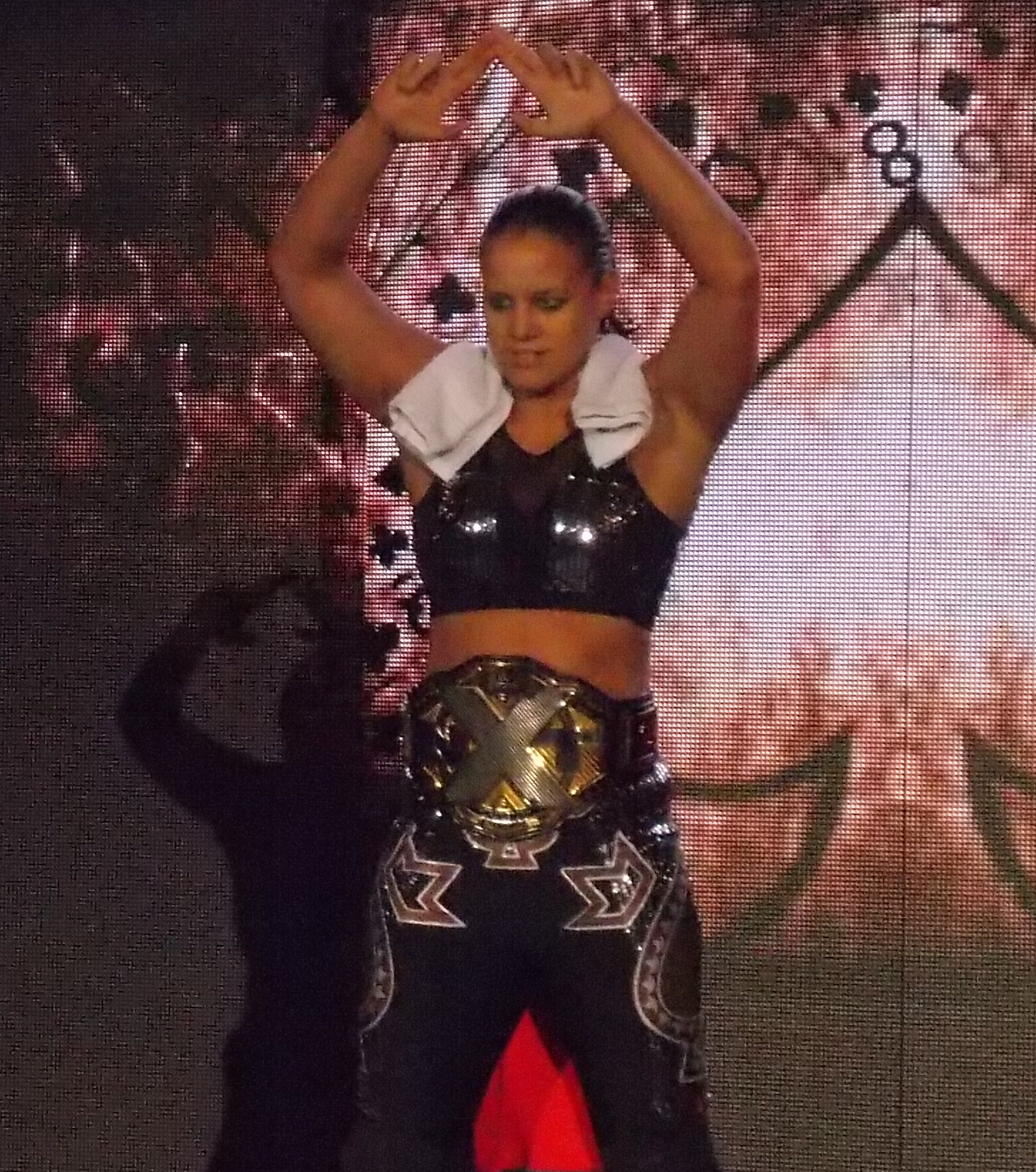
Record-tying two-time and longest combined-reigning champion Shayna Baszler held the title for a combined total of 549 days (548 days as recognized by WWE)

As of November 15, 2026.

†	Indicates the current champion
¤	The exact length of at least one title reign is uncertain, so the shortest length is considered

Rank	Wrestler	No. of reigns	Combined days	Combined days rec. by WWE
1	Shayna Baszler	2	549	548
2	Asuka	1	510	522
3	Mandy Rose	1	413	
4	Roxanne Perez	2	385	384
5	Charlotte Flair	2 (Note: She was known as just Charlotte during her first reign.)	¤331	321
6	Paige	1	308	273
7	Iyo Sky	1	304	
8	Jacy Jayne	2	288	286
9	Bayley	1	223	
10	Raquel Rodriguez	1	202	201
11	Sasha Banks	1	192	191
12	Lyra Valkyria	1	165	164
13	Ember Moon	1	140	139
14	Tiffany Stratton	1	107	
15	Rhea Ripley	1	¤98	108
16	Lola Vice	1	85	
17	Kelani Jordan †	1	77+	
18	Stephanie Vaquer	1	77	
19	Kairi Sane	1	71	
20	Giulia	1	63	
20	Kendal Grey	1	63	
22	Becky Lynch	1	42	
23	Indi Hartwell	1	31	
24	Tatum Paxley	1	24	
