= Shotzi Blackheart =

American professional wrestler (born 1992)

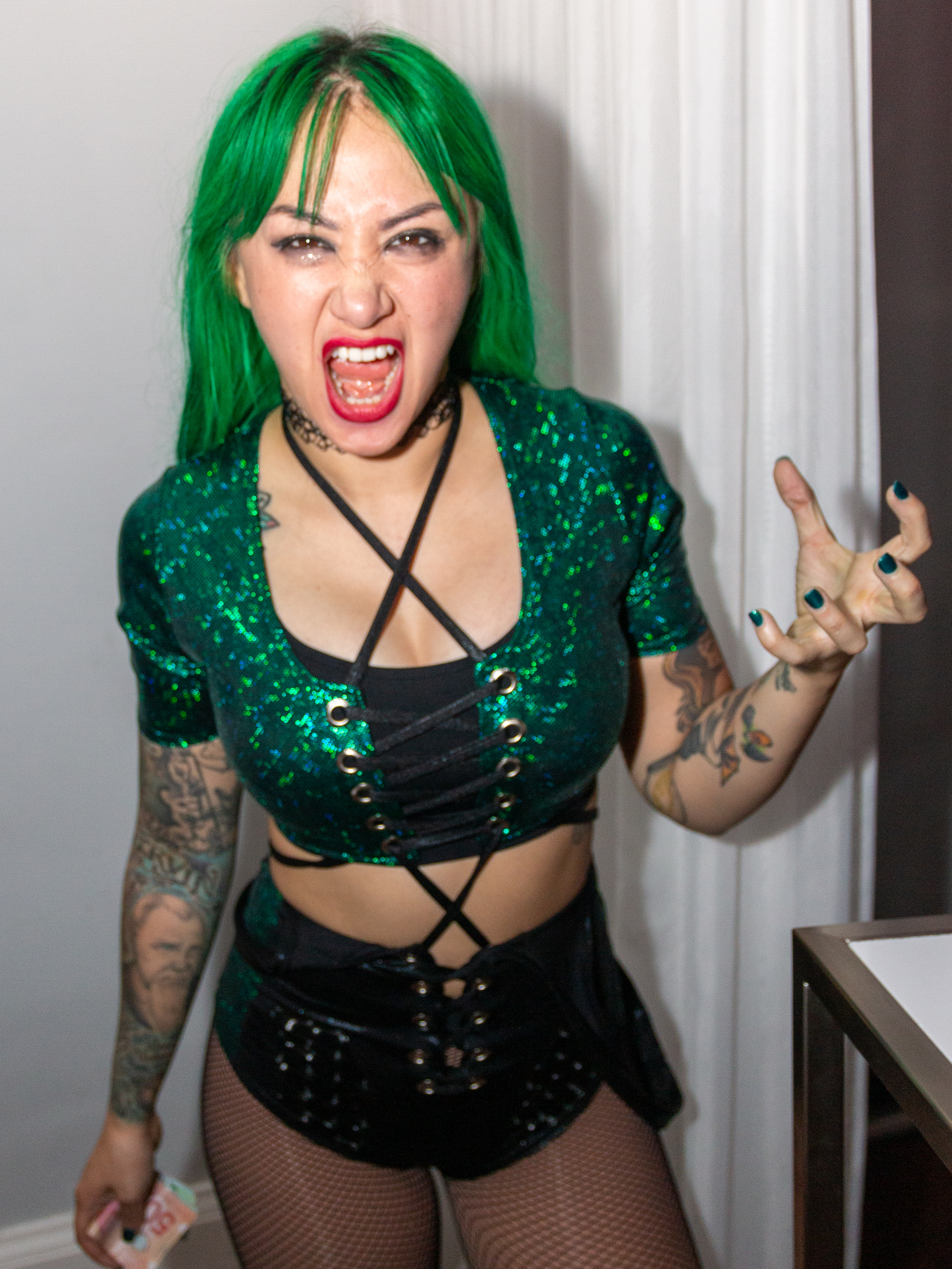
- Blackheart in 2019

Personal information
- Born: Ashley Louise Urbanski; March 14, 1992 (age 34) Santa Clara County, California, U.S.
- Spouse: Jesús Alfaro (m. 2023)

Professional wrestling career
- Ring name(s): Missy Highasshit; Missy Hyasshit; Pizza Cat; Shotzi; Shotzi Blackheart
- Billed height: 5 ft 6 in (168 cm)
- Billed weight: 125 lb (57 kg)
- Billed from: Oakland, California; The Black Lagoon
- Trained by: Rick Stoner; WWE Performance Center
- Debut: April 20, 2014

Ashley Louise Alfaro (née Urbanski; born March 14, 1992), better known by her ring name Shotzi Blackheart, is an American professional wrestler. She is signed to Total Nonstop Action Wrestling (TNA), and also makes appearances on the independent circuit. She is best known for her tenure in WWE, where she performed under the mononymous ring name Shotzi, and is a former one-time NXT Women's Tag Team Champion, and Major League Wrestling (MLW), where she is a former one-time MLW World Women's Featherweight Champion.

Prior to joining WWE, Alfaro performed for various promotions on the independent circuit, such as Shimmer Women Athletes, Evolve, Rise Wrestling, and Shine Wrestling, where she won the Shine Nova Championship.

== Early life ==
Ashley Louise Urbanski was born on March 14, 1992, in Santa Clara County, California. She is of Filipino descent. At age seven, she began doing musical theatre which she would continue into college.

== Professional wrestling career ==
=== Early career (2014–2019) ===
Early career

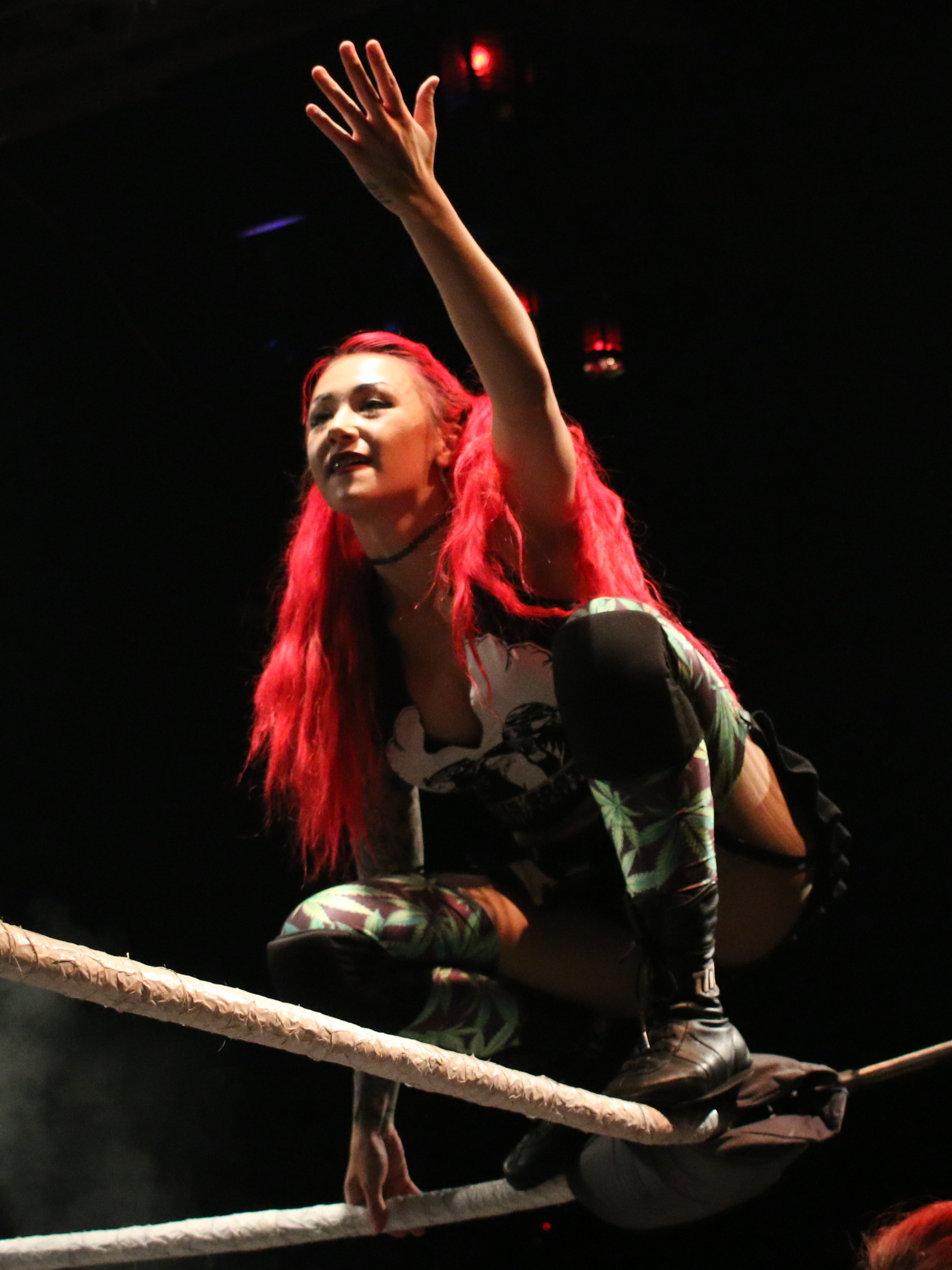
Urbanski appeared in underground absurdist promotion Hoodslam as "Missy Highasshit", a parody of Missy Hyatt.

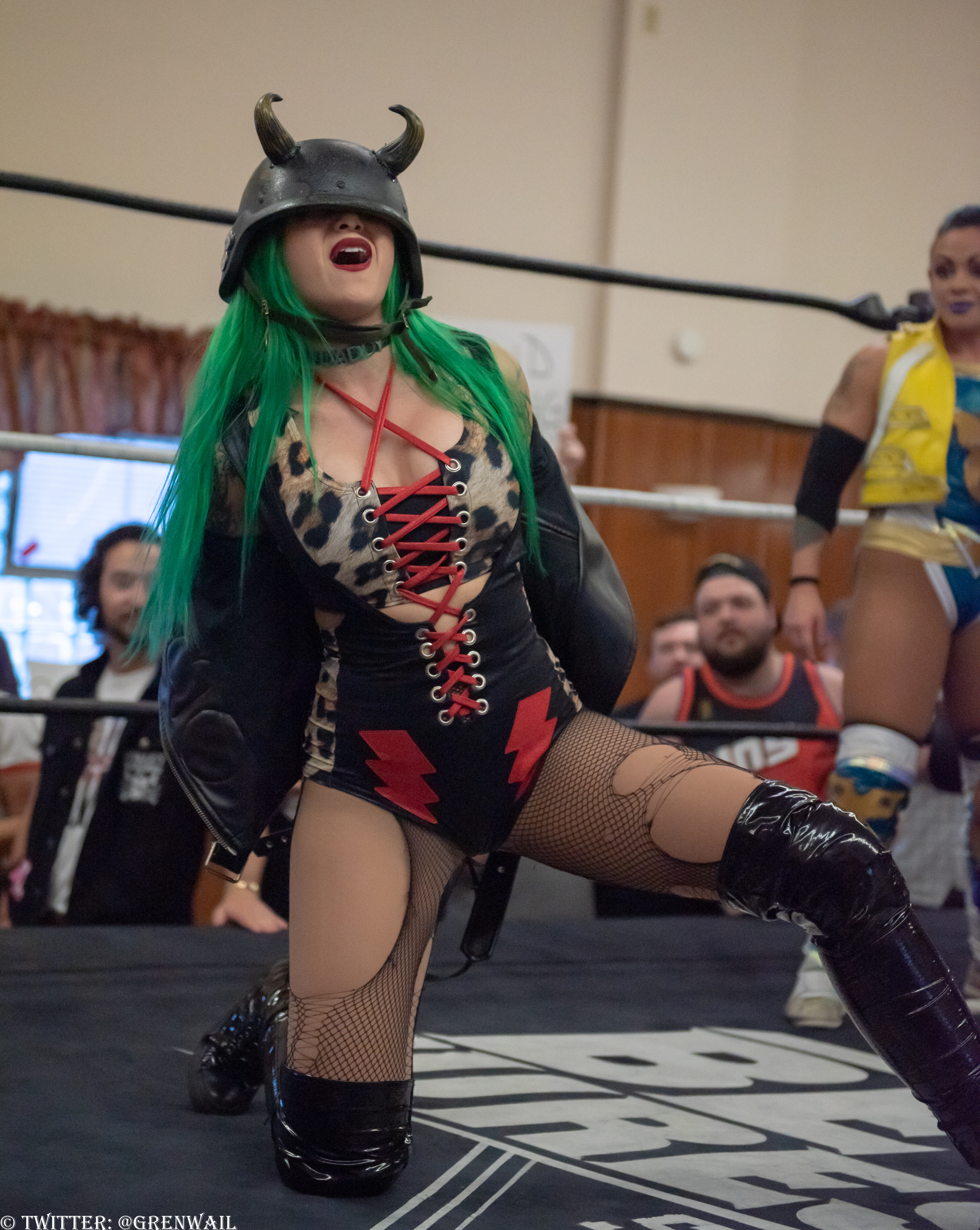
Shotzi in 2018 during a Beyond Wrestling event

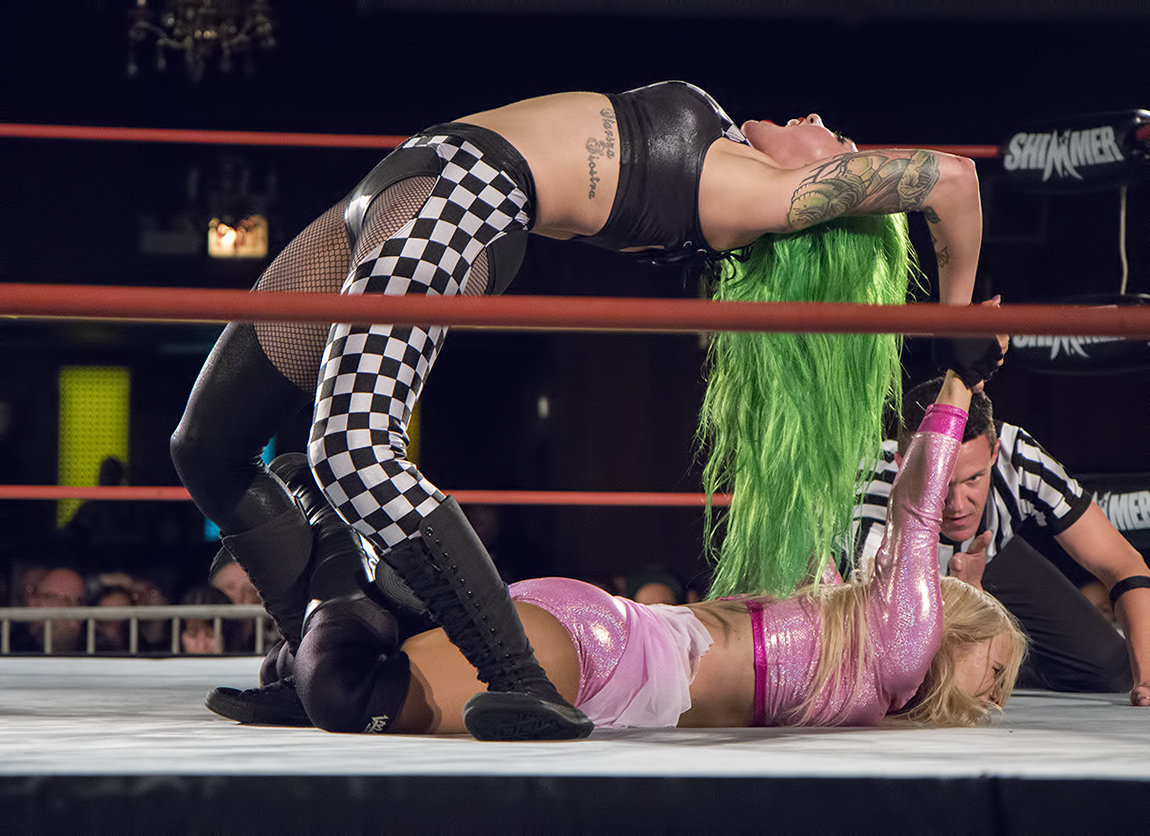
Blackheart applying a submission hold to Shazza McKenzie during a SHIMMER show

Urbanski began her career at Hoodslam in Oakland, California in 2014 as Missy Highasshit, a cheerleader valet for the Stoner Brothers and stable Stoner U (a comedic parody of Missy Hyatt and the Steiner Brothers). She also frequently appeared on the California independent circuit, wrestling for All Pro Wrestling, Bar Wrestling, and Big Time Wrestling, as well as Nashville, Tennessee promotion Impact Wrestling.

In 2015, Urbanski took part in the trials for the sixth season of WWE's competition Tough Enough. She was initially selected as one of 6 women who would take part in that season's competition, but had to withdraw from it before it began, due to a previously undiagnosed irregular heartbeat causing a failed medical. She had a tryout for WWE Performance Center in May 2016 but was not offered a contract.

Urbanski made her debut for Shimmer Women Athletes on November 11, 2016, in a loss to Melanie Cruise. She made her Evolve debut at Evolve 115 on November 9, 2018, under the ring name Shotzi Blackheart (the last name being a reference to American rock singer Joan Jett, of whom Urbanski is a fan), challenging Allysin Kay for the Shine Championship in a losing effort. Blackheart also competed for Shine Wrestling, and at Shine 58 on May 10, 2019, Blackheart defeated Aja Perera to win the Shine Nova Championship. At Shine 59 on June 29, she retained the title in a triple threat match involving Perera and Santana Garrett. Blackheart successfully defended the title against Natalia Markova at Shine 60.

At Evolve 137 on October 11, 2019, after defeating Perera, William Regal, who at that time was working for WWE's developmental brand NXT, offered Blackheart a WWE contract during an unannounced appearance, and due to this, she had to vacate the Shine Nova Championship.

=== WWE (2019–2025) ===
==== NXT (2019–2021) ====
In October 2019, Urbanski signed with WWE and reported to the WWE Performance Center. She then joined the company in November 2019. She made her debut on an NXT house show on December 5, 2019, losing to Chelsea Green. She made her televised debut on the December 25 episode of NXT as a face, still under her independent ring name Shotzi Blackheart in a loss to Bianca Belair. At the Royal Rumble on January 26, 2020, Blackheart entered her first Royal Rumble match at #26 before being eliminated by Baszler. On the June 17 episode of NXT, Blackheart and Tegan Nox challenged Bayley and Sasha Banks for the WWE Women's Tag Team Championship, which they were unsuccessful in winning.

At Halloween Havoc, she served as the host during that episode, preventing Shirai during her match against Candice LeRae from being attacked by a mysterious person wearing a Ghostface mask (later revealed as Indi Hartwell). She formed an alliance with Rhea Ripley, Shirai, and Ember Moon to compete at the TakeOver: WarGames, where they faced off against LeRae, Toni Storm, Raquel González, and Dakota Kai in a WarGames match, which her team lost. Blackheart and Moon participated in the Women's Dusty Rhodes Tag Team Classic, but were defeated in the finals by Kai and González at Vengeance Day. On the March 10 episode of NXT, Blackheart and Moon defeated Kai and González to win the NXT Women's Tag Team Championship, her first title in NXT. After retaining the titles at TakeOver: Stand & Deliver against The Way, they lost it against them on the may 5 episode of NXT in a street fight, which also marked Blackheart's final appearance for the brand.

==== SmackDown (2021–2024) ====
On the July 9 episode of SmackDown, Blackheart, now under the shortened ring name Shotzi, debuted alongside Tegan Nox as Shotzi & Nox, but the team was disbanded when, as part of the 2021 Draft, Nox was drafted to the Raw brand while Shotzi remained on the SmackDown brand. On the October 29 episode of SmackDown, after losing to SmackDown Women's Champion Charlotte Flair in a championship contenders match, Shotzi attacked Sasha Banks who was at ringside, turning heel in the process.

She worked on the SmackDown brand, participating in PPVs like Survivor Series 2021, Royal Rumble 2022, or Money in the Bank 2022. She and Xia Li participated in the WWE Women's Tag Team Championship Tournament for the vacant tag titles, but were eliminated by Raquel Rodriguez and Aliyah in the first round.

On the September 16 episode of SmackDown, Shotzi saved Rodriguez from an attack by Damage CTRL (Dakota Kai and Iyo Sky), turning face in the process. On the October 21 episode of SmackDown, Shotzi and Rodriguez challenged Kai and Sky for the Women's Tag Team Championship, but were unsuccessful after Bayley distracted Shotzi. The next day, she served as the host for NXT Halloween Havoc alongside Quincy Elliot, attacking Lash Legend after she interrupted them. On the November 11 episode of SmackDown, Shotzi won a six-pack challenge, earning a SmackDown Women's Championship match against Ronda Rousey at Survivor Series WarGames. At the event, Shotzi failed to win the title after interference from Shayna Baszler.

In the summer of 2023, Shotzi began feuding with Damage CTRL. Shotzi had some hair cut off by them, following an assault. She then decided to get back at them and remove her green hair entirely in a segment, although this was not just part of a storyline, but also done as a tribute to her sister in real life, who suffers from bile duct cancer. Shotzi revealed her new look in a house show at Mexico City. In November at Survivor Series: WarGames, Shotzi, along with Bianca Belair, Charlotte Flair and Becky Lynch, defeated Damage CTRL (Bayley, Asuka, Iyo Sky, and Kairi Sane) in a WarGames match.

==== Return to NXT (2024–2025) ====
During the February 13, 2024, taping of the February 20 episode of NXT, Shotzi faced off against NXT Women's Champion Lyra Valkyria in a title match after trading shots on social media weeks prior, during which she suffered a knee injury and the match was put to an abrupt end. Shotzi was slated to face Tiffany Stratton on the February 16 episode of SmackDown in a qualifying match for a spot at the Elimination Chamber match at Elimination Chamber: Perth, but due to having suffered a torn ACL during her match against Valkyria, which ruled her unable to compete for approximately nine months, her spot was taken over by Alba Fyre.

Shotzi returned from injury on the December 10, 2024 episode of NXT, running to the aid of Gigi Dolin and Tatum Paxley as the pair faced an attack by Fatal Influence (Fallon Henley, Jacy Jayne, and Jazmyn Nyx), starting a feud with Fatal Influence and an alliance with Dolin and Paxley in the process. The teams faced each other at NXT: New Year's Evil on January 7, 2025, with Shotzi's team coming out victorious. Her final WWE appearance was at NXT Stand & Deliver on April 19, where she accompanied Dolin and Paxley to win a fatal four-way tag team elimination match on the pre-show to become the #1 contenders for the WWE Women's Tag Team Championship. On May 3, Shotzi departed WWE as her contract with the company expired, ending her six-year tenure with the company and effectively ending the alliance of Shotzi, Paxley, and Dolin, the latter of whom was released a day prior.

=== Independent circuit (2025–present) ===
On June 6, 2025, Blackheart returned to the independent circuit, competing at Hoodslam's Fearless event against one of her original trainers, Rick Stoner. Two days later, she made her debut for Game Changer Wrestling (GCW) as a surprise entrant in the Tournament of Survival, where she was defeated by Matt Tremont in a three-way deathmatch for the GCW Ultraviolent Championship, also involving Jimmy Lloyd. After the match, Blackheart dubbed herself the "Indy God", which started a feud with Matt Cardona, who also used the nickname. On July 5, Blackheart made her debut for Maple Leaf Pro Wrestling (MLP) at Resurrection, where she unsuccessfully challenged Gisele Shaw for the MLP Canadian Women's Championship. On November 21, 2025, Shotzi Blackheart defeated Indi Hartwell at Return to the Windy City to become the new House of Glory Women's Champion.

=== Major League Wrestling (2025–2026) ===
On June 26, 2025, at Summer of the Beasts, Blackheart made her debut for Major League Wrestling (MLW), where she confronted Yuki Kamifuku. Blackheart and Kamifuku were then interrupted by Ava Everett. This led a match between Blackheart and Everett at Blood and Thunder on August 9, where Blackheart defeayed Everett. Blackheart defeated Shoko Nakajima on February 7, 2026 to win MLW World Women's Featherweight Championship. On September 12, Blackheart lost the title to the debuting Masha Slamovich. On October 5, Blackheart's MLW contract expired and was not renewed.

=== Total Nonstop Action Wrestling (2026–present) ===
On October 19, 2026, it was announced that Blackheart had signed with Total Nonstop Action Wrestling (TNA). She made her return three days later on Impact!, saving Allie from an attack by Kiera Hogan and Tasha Steelz.

== Other media ==
Prior to signing with WWE, Urbanski used her Blackheart character for two late-night TV shows for KOFY, a local San Francisco TV station. She first was cast as a dancer for Creepy KOFY Movie Time, a sketch comedy show that featured horror movies. She then appeared as a guest on Circus of Chaos, a satirical variety show.

In April 2021, Urbanski alongside fellow professional wrestler Elizabeth Chihaia (best known as Scarlett) were featured on fellow wrestler and singer Harley Cameron's music video "Indestructible". On October 14, 2022, the trio performed "I Put a Spell on You" (as a tribute of the film Hocus Pocus) in a music video which was released by WWE.

She made her WWE video game debut as a playable character in WWE 2K22. She also appeared in WWE 2K23.

In September 2023, she started hosting a ghost hunting show titled "Chamber of Horrors" alongside Scarlett on WWE's YouTube channel.

== Personal life ==
On December 29, 2023, before a WWE house show in Las Vegas, Urbanski married her longtime boyfriend Jesús Alfaro. She subsequently competed at the house show in her wedding dress.

== Filmography ==
Year	Title	Role	Notes
2013	World of Death	Chain Doe	
2013	Mrs. Claus	Chain Doe	Short film
2016	Forgotten Tales	Woman in Tub	
2016	Hetja 3	Blackheart	Short film
2017	Doll Murder Spree	Nancy	Short film
2019	Aweful: I Never Knew	Shotzi the Sea Witch	Short film
2023	Celtic Warrior Workouts	Herself	episode 126
2023–present	Chamber of Horrors	Herself	
2025	Executioner!	Ash	

== Championships and accomplishments ==
- Alternative Wrestling Show
  - AWS Women's Championship (1 time)
- Atomic Legacy Wrestling
  - ALW Horror Nights Championship (1 time, inaugural, current)
- Awesome Championship Wrestling
  - ACW Women's Championship (1 time, current)
- East Bay Pro Wrestling
  - EBPW Ladies Championship (1 time)
- Game Changer Wrestling
  - Garage Beer World Championship (1 time, current)
  - Clusterfuck Battle Royal (2026)
- Gold Rush Pro Wrestling
  - GRPW Lady Luck Championship (1 time)
- Gremlin House Wrestling
  - Greta World Championship (1 time, inaugural, current)
- Hoodslam
  - Best Athlete in the East Bay Championship (1 time)
  - Intergalactic Tag Team Championship (1 time) – with Joey Ryan
- House of Glory
  - HOG Women's Championship (1 time, current)
- IWA Mid-South
  - IWA Mid-South Women's Championship (1 time)
- Lucha Libre And Laughs
  - LLL Championship (1 time)
- Major League Wrestling
  - MLW World Women's Featherweight Championship (1 time)
- Pro Wrestling Illustrated
  - Ranked No. 291 of the top singles wrestlers in the PWI 500 in 2026
  - Ranked No. 30 of the top 150 female wrestlers in the PWI Women's 150 in 2021
  - Indie Wrestler of the Year (2024)
- Rise Wrestling
  - Phoenix of RISE Championship (1 time)
- Sabotage Wrestling
  - Sabotage War of the Genders Championship (2 times)
- Shine Wrestling
  - Shine Nova Championship (1 time)
- Squared Circle Expo
  - SCX Women's Championship (1 time, current)
- Women's Wrestling Fan Awards
  - Rookie of the Year (2020)
- WWE
  - NXT Women's Tag Team Championship (1 time) – with Ember Moon
  - NXT Year-End Award (1 time)
    - Breakout Star of the Year (2020)
