= The Way (professional wrestling) =

Professional wrestling stable

Stable
- Leader(s): Johnny Gargano; Candice LeRae
- Members: Austin Theory; Indi Hartwell; Dexter Lumis
- Name(s): The Way; Candice LeRae and Indi Hartwell
- Debut: December 9, 2020
- Disbanded: October 1, 2021
- Years active: 2020–2021

The Way was a professional wrestling stable in WWE. The stable was led by Johnny Gargano and Candice LeRae, and featured Austin Theory, Indi Hartwell, and Dexter Lumis. The stable worked between 2020 and 2021 in WWE on the NXT brand and for a brief period, on the Raw and SmackDown brands. During that time, Gargano won the NXT North American Championship twice, while LeRae and Hartwell won the NXT Women's Tag Team Championship.

== History ==
=== Background ===
On February 16, 2020, at NXT TakeOver: Portland, Gargano turned heel by costing Tommaso Ciampa, his longtime partner and rival, his match against Adam Cole for the NXT Championship, with Gargano justifying his actions by exclaiming that Ciampa had put him through hell for nearly two years and was simply getting his long-overdue revenge. On the April 8 episode of NXT, Gargano and Ciampa faced off in an Empty Arena match, during which LeRae, who for several weeks prior attempted to play peacemaker between the two, also turned heel by assisting Gargano in defeating Ciampa, therefore ending the longtime feud between them.

Following this, Gargano and LeRae began portraying themselves as a power couple, and feuded with another one of NXT's power couples, Keith Lee and Mia Yim. At TakeOver: In Your House, Gargano faced Lee for the NXT North American Championship, but despite LeRae's interference, Gargano was defeated, thanks to Yim fending off LeRae.

=== Formation ===
On October 28 at NXT: Halloween Havoc, Gargano defeated Damian Priest in a Devil's Playground match to become a two-time NXT North American Champion, and later that same night, LeRae faced Io Shirai for the NXT Women's Championship, during which she was assisted by a masked figure wearing the Ghostface costume, but the figure was fended off by Shotzi Blackheart, ultimately costing LeRae the match. On the November 11 episode of NXT, the masked figure was revealed to be Indi Hartwell, who aligned herself with LeRae. On that same night, Gargano dropped the NXT North American Championship to Leon Ruff thanks to Priest's interference, leading to a three-way feud between them. On December 6 at NXT TakeOver: WarGames, another masked figure dressed as Ghostface interfered in Gargano's Triple Threat match against Ruff and Priest, and assisted Gargano into winning, therefore allowing Gargano to become the first-ever three time NXT North American Champion. After the match, the masked figure revealed himself as Austin Theory.

On the December 9 episode of NXT, Gargano, LeRae, Theory, and Hartwell all appeared together and formally named their alliance as "The Way". Going into 2021, Gargano and Theory teamed up during the 2021 Men's Dusty Rhodes Tag Team Classic, while LeRae and Hartwell paired up during the Women's counterpart. On the January 20 episode of NXT, Gargano and Theory were eliminated in the first round by Kushida and Ruff, although LeRae and Hartwell advanced towards the semi-finals on the February 10 episode of NXT, where they were eliminated by Ember Moon and Shotzi Blackheart.

=== Success and addition of Lumis ===
Gargano's elimination led to a feud between him and Kushida over the championship, and after trading attacks, it was announced that Gargano would defend his championship against Kushida at NXT TakeOver: Vengeance Day on February 14, where Gargano successfully retained his title. Prior to the match, Theory was abducted by Dexter Lumis, whom Theory had been feuding with at the time due to Theory interfering in Lumis' matches against Gargano. On the following episode of NXT, Theory was "found" by Gargano, and Theory seemed relatively okay, albeit extremely positive and cheerful, much to his teammates's confusion and worry. On the February 24 episode of NXT, Gargano faced Lumis in a non-title match, and during the match, LeRae urged Theory attack Lumis with a steel chair, but Theory hesitated, leading to Gargano being ultimately defeated. Also during the match, Hartwell seemed to have gained a level of attraction towards Lumis, and remarked in a post-match backstage segment that Lumis was "hot", shocking Gargano and LeRae.

On the May 4, 2021 episode of NXT, LeRae and Hartwell would defeat Ember Moon and Shotzi Blackheart in a Street Fight to capture the NXT Women's Tag Team Championship, thus marking each woman's first title win in WWE. On the May 18 episode of NXT, Gargano lost the North American Championship to Bronson Reed in a steel cage match. At The Great American Bash, LeRae and Hartwell lost the titles to Io Shirai and Zoey Stark following a distraction from a returning Tegan Nox.

On the August 3 episode of NXT, Gargano competed in a Love Her or Lose her match with Dexter Lumis for Indi Hartwell. Hartwell came out to ringside before Gargano pinned Lumis. As The Way was walking to the backstage area, Hartwell ran back to the ring and pounced on Lumis despite the stipulation. The storyline would result in a wedding between Hartwell and Lumis being held on the September 14 episode of NXT 2.0. Lumis joined The Way during this process.

=== Dissolution and aftermath ===
Following the wedding, The Way would slowly begin to drift apart. Theory would be drafted to Raw during the 2021 WWE Draft and LeRae went on maternity leave. The Way's final appearance was on December 7 episode of NXT 2.0, in which Gargano, Hartwell and Lumis embraced in a backstage segment. Later that night, Gargano cut a farewell promo, marking his last appearance in NXT as his contract would expire three days later. On April 29, 2022, Lumis was released from his WWE contract. On May 6, LeRae left WWE without reappearing on television after her contract expired.

On the August 8 episode of Raw, Lumis returned to WWE, and Gargano made his unannounced return two weeks later. Lumis appeared on the August 23 episode of NXT and reunited with Hartwell. On the September 26 episode of Raw, LeRae returned to WWE, defeating Nikki A.S.H., leaving Indi as the sole member in NXT.

== Members ==
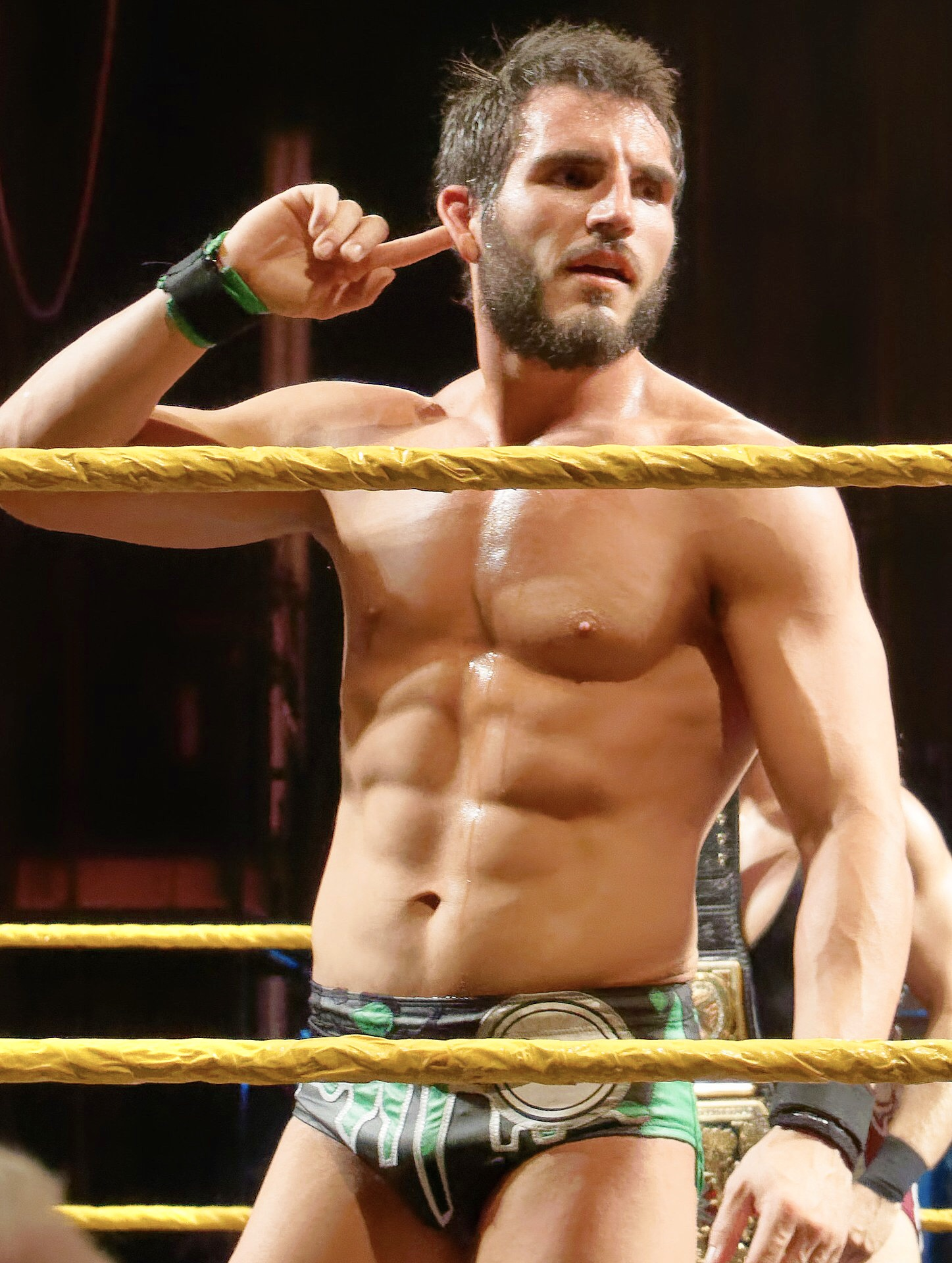
Johnny Gargano (co-leader)

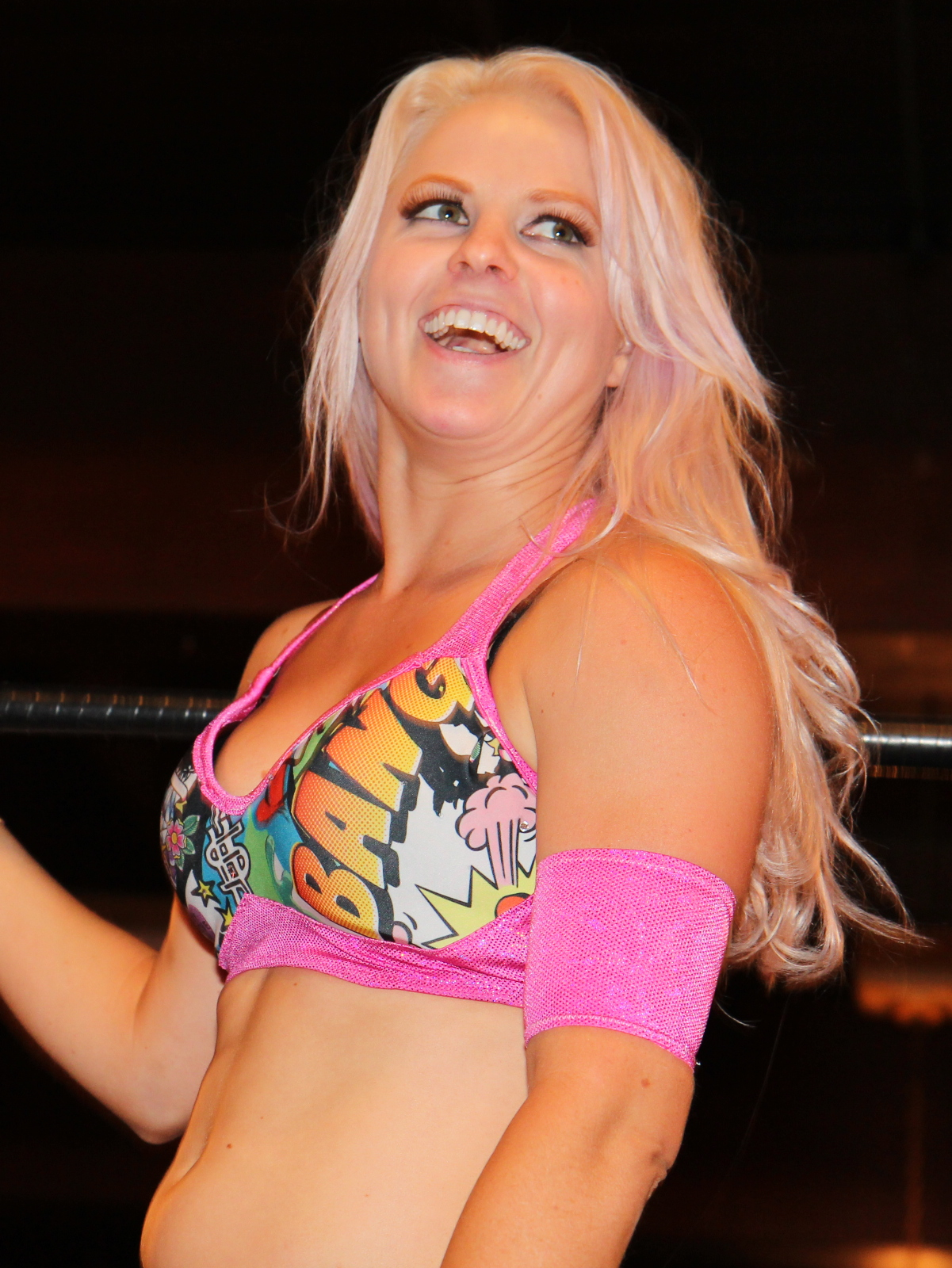
Candice LeRae (co-leader)

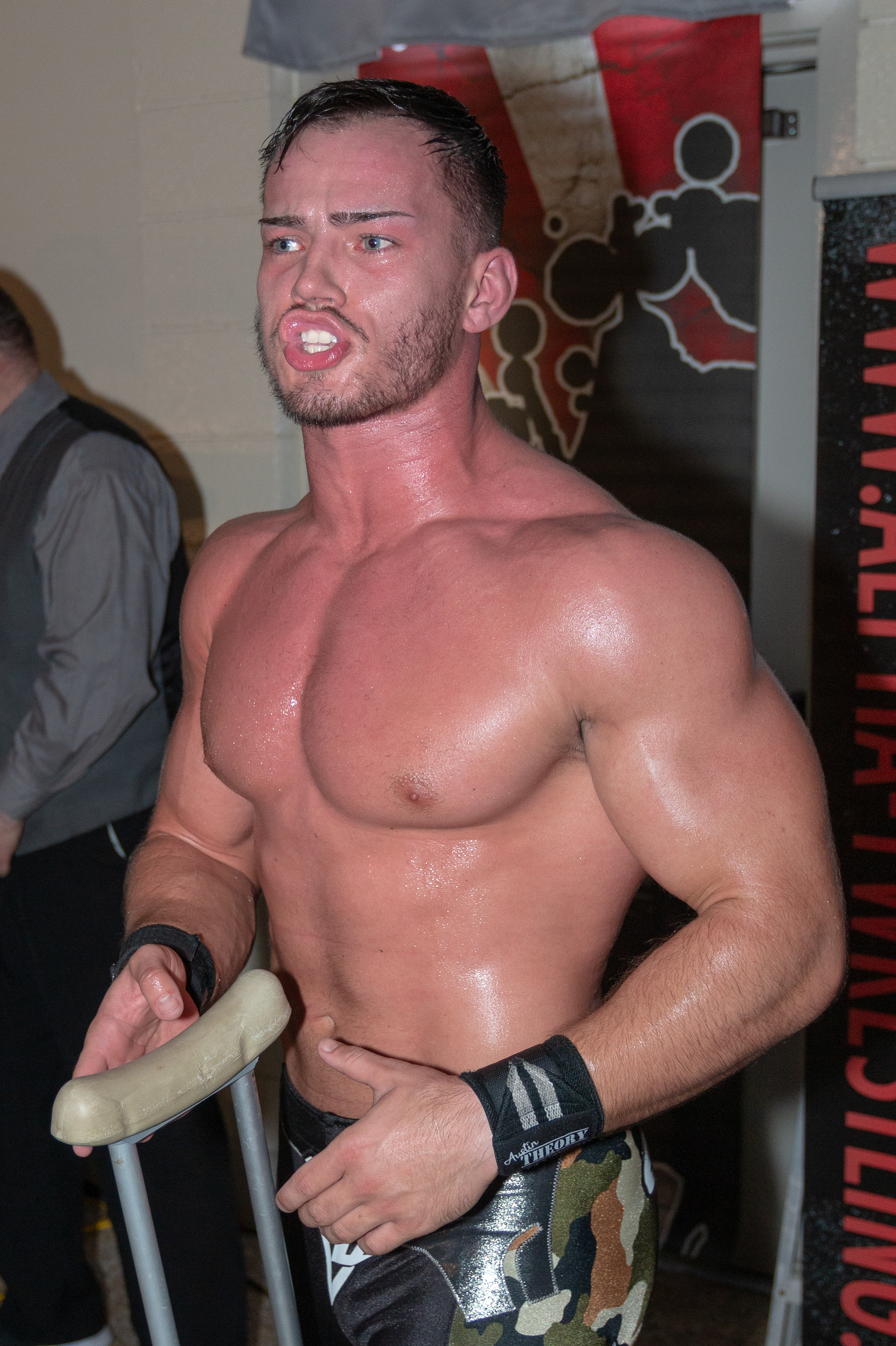
Austin Theory

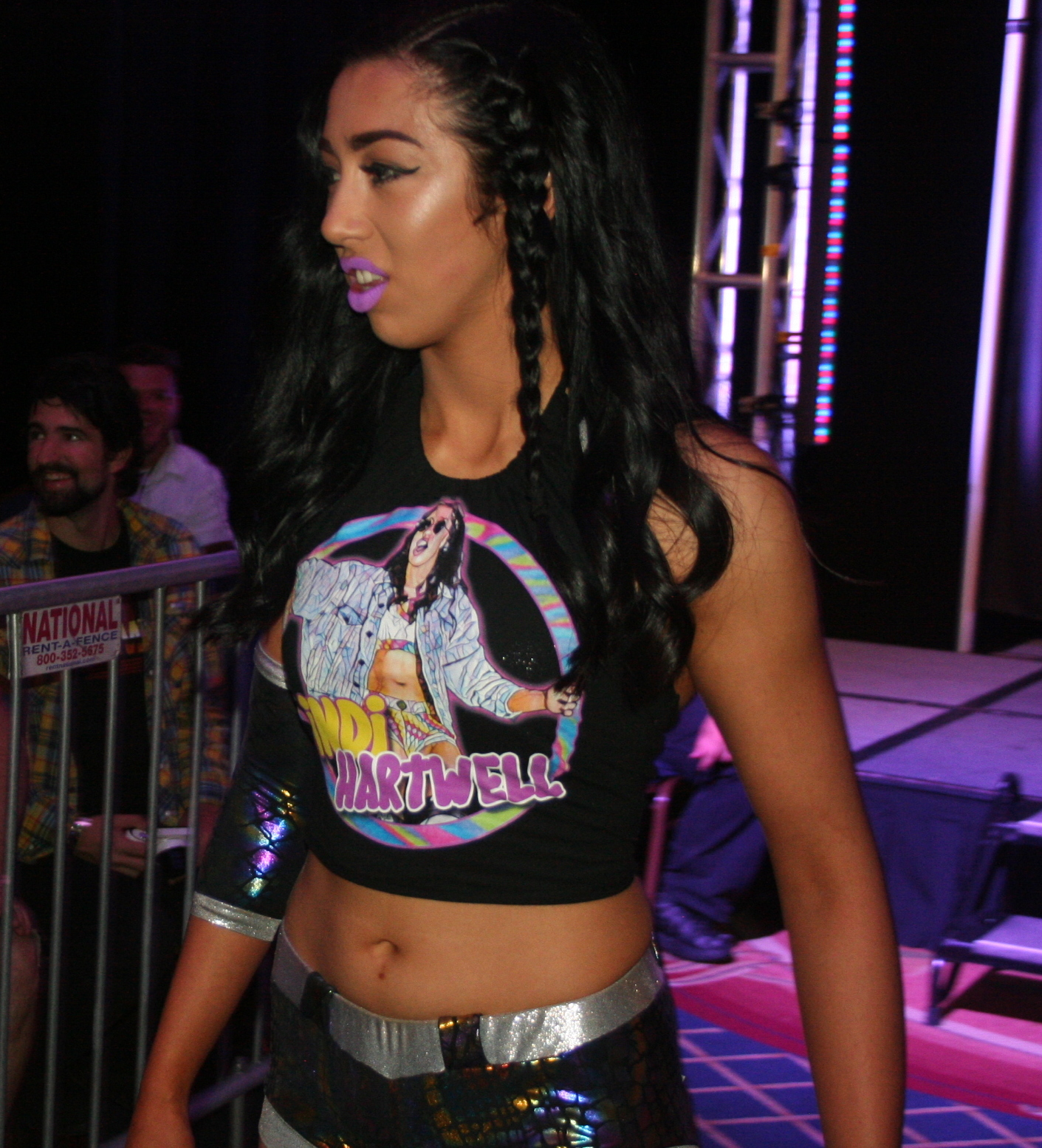
Indi Hartwell

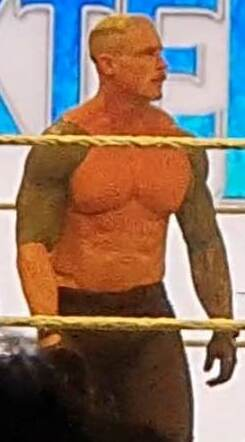
Dexter Lumis

*	Founding member(s)
L	Leader

Member	Joined	Left
Johnny Gargano (L)	December 9, 2020 *	October 1, 2021
Candice LeRae (L)	December 9, 2020 *	October 1, 2021
Indi Hartwell	December 9, 2020 *	October 1, 2021
Austin Theory	December 9, 2020 *	October 1, 2021
Dexter Lumis	September 14, 2021	October 1, 2021

== Championships and accomplishments ==
- Pro Wrestling Illustrated
  - Ranked Hartwell No. 83 of the top 100 female wrestlers in the PWI Female 100 in 2020
- WWE
  - NXT North American Championship (1 time) – Gargano
  - NXT Women's Tag Team Championship (1 time) – LeRae and Hartwell
  - NXT Year-End Award (1 time)
    - Future Star of NXT (2020) – Theory
