= HOG Women's Championship =

Women's professional wrestling championship

HOG Women’s Championship

Details
- Promotion: House Of Glory
- Date established: March 2017
- Current champion: Shotzi Blackheart
Statistics
- First champion: Violette
- Most reigns: Violette/The Ultra Violette (2 reigns)
- Longest reign: Harley Rae (838 days)
- Shortest reign: Bobbi Tyler (145 days)

The HOG Women's Championship is a women's professional wrestling championship created and promoted by House of Glory (HOG). The current champion is Shotzi Blackheart in her first reign.

== History ==
On September 29, 2017 Violette became the first ever HOG Women’s Champion.

== Reigns ==
As of September 5, 2026.

Key
No.	Overall reign number
Reign	Reign number for the specific champion
Days	Number of days held
+	Current reign is changing daily

No.	Champion	Championship change			Reign statistics		Notes	Ref.
No.	Champion	Date	Event	Location	Reign	Days	Notes	Ref.
1	Violette	September 29, 2017	HOG	New York City, NY	1	322		
2	Sonya Strong	August 17, 2018	HOG	New York City, NY	1	231		
3	Bobbi Tyler	April 5, 2019	HOG	New York City, NY	1	145		
4	Harley Rae	August 28, 2019	HOG	Canterbury, Kent, England, UK	1	838		
—	Vacated	December 13, 2021	HOG	—	—	—	Harley relinquished the title.	
5	Natalia Markova	January 14, 2022	HOG	New York City, NY	1	253	Natalia defeated Jordynne Grace for the vacant title	
6	The Ultra Violette	September 24, 2022	HOG	New York City, NY	2	671	Violette known as The Ultra Violette defeated Natalia, became two time for the HOG Women’s Championship.	
7	Megan Bayne	July 26, 2024	HOG	New York City, NY	1	287		
—	Vacated	May 9, 2025	HOG	Chicago, Illinois	—	—	Megan relinquished her title before coming to AEW.	
8	Indi Hartwell	May 9, 2025	HOG	Chicago, Illinois	1	196	Indi defeated Miyu Yamashita and became the HOG Women’s Champion the first time.	
9	Shotzi Blackheart	November 21, 2025	HOG	Chicago, Illinois	1	288+		

== Combined reigns ==
As of September 5, 2026.

†	Indicates the current champion

Rank	Wrestler	No. of reigns	Combined days
1	Violette/The Ultra Violette	2	993
2	Harley Rae	1	838
3	Shotzi Blackheart †	1	288+
4	Megan Bayne	1	287
5	Natalia Markova	1	253
6	Sonya Strong	1	231
7	Indi Hartwell	1	196
8	Bobbi Tyler	1	145
