= Indi Hartwell =

Australian professional wrestler (born 1996)

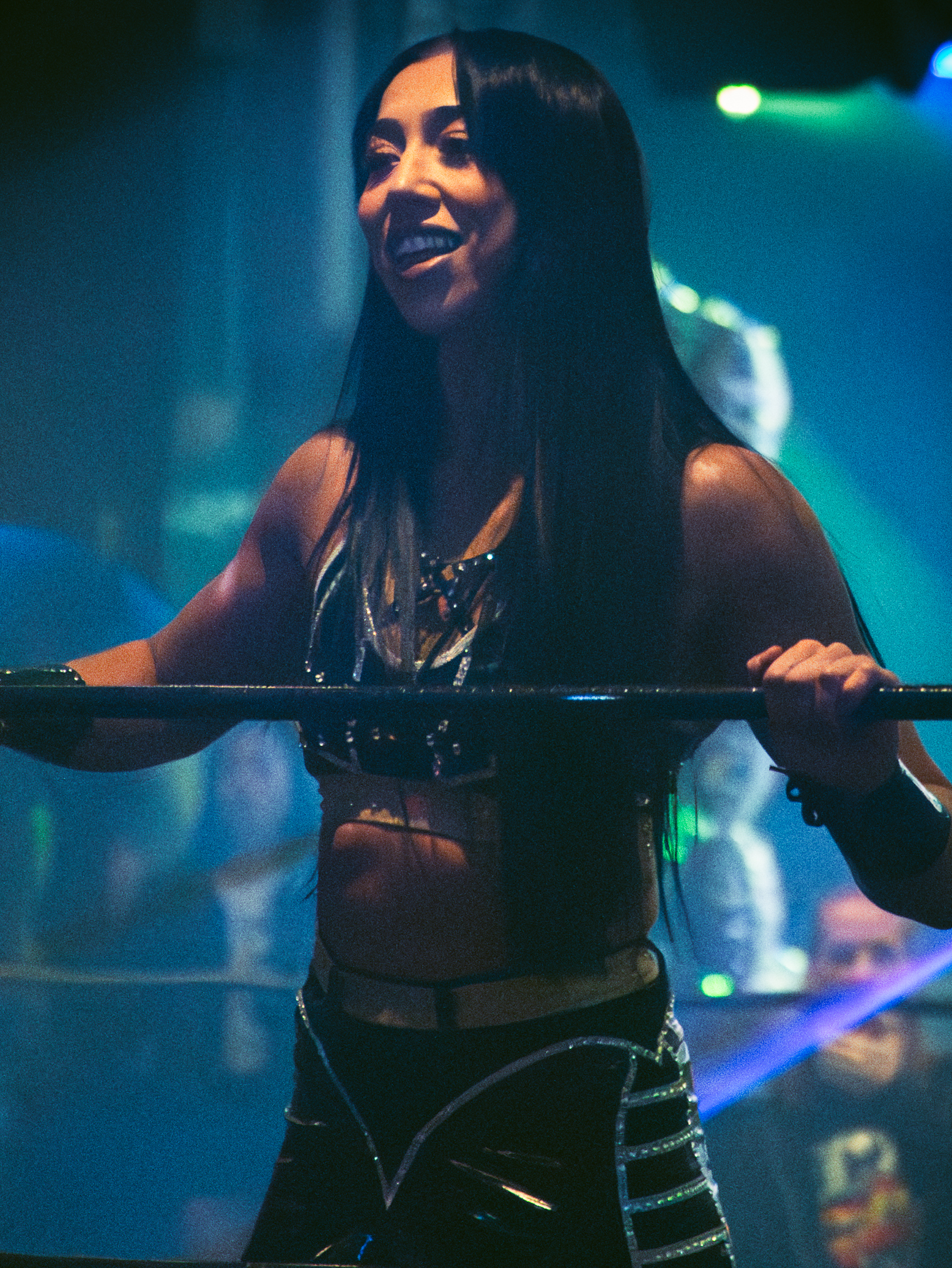
- Hartwell in April 2025

Personal information
- Born: Samantha De Martin; 17 August 1996 (age 30) Melbourne, Victoria, Australia
- Life partners: Lissette (2022–present; engaged)

Professional wrestling career
- Ring name(s): Indi Hartwell; Samantha De Martin
- Billed from: Melbourne, Australia
- Trained by: PCW Academy; WWE Performance Center
- Debut: 19 March 2016

Samantha De Martin (born 17 August 1996), better known by the ring name Indi Hartwell, is an Australian professional wrestler. She is currently signed to Total Nonstop Action Wrestling (TNA), where she is the TNA Knockouts World Champion in her first reign.

She is best known for her tenure in WWE from 2019 to 2024, where she was a one-time NXT Women's Champion and one-time NXT Women's Tag Team Champion with Candice LeRae, and she was a member of The Way stable. Before signing with WWE, De Martin performed for promotions such as Riot City Wrestling (RCW) and World Series Wrestling (WSW) in Australia. She was a one-time RCW Women's Champion and one-time WSW Women's Champion.

== Professional wrestling career ==
=== Independent circuit (2016–2019) ===
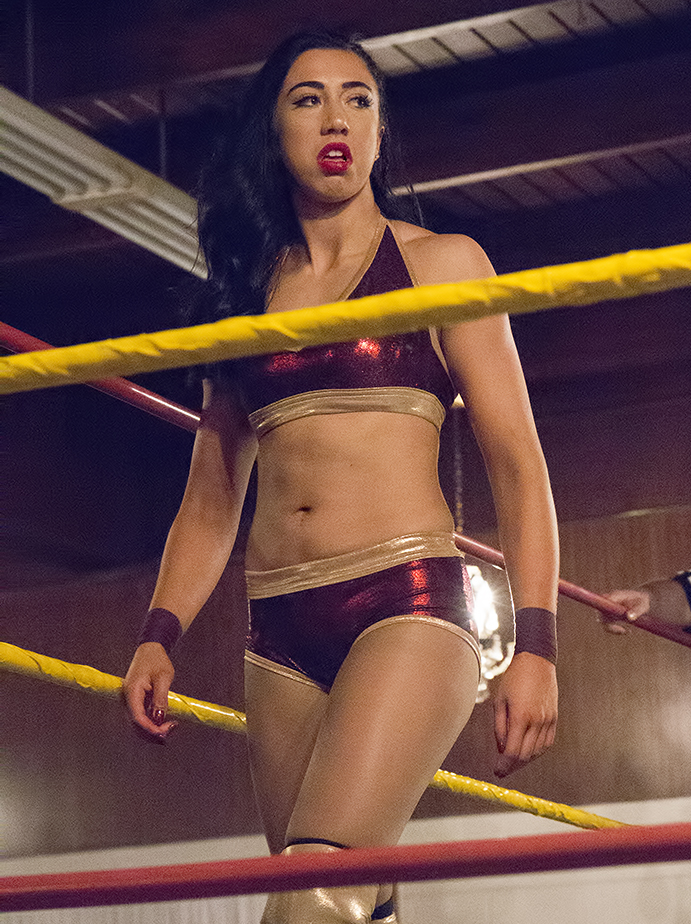
Hartwell in November 2017.

De Martin began her training at the age of 19, and she was trained by Professional Championship Wrestling (PCW) Academy in Melbourne. Hartwell made her professional wrestling debut in March 2016, in her home country of Australia. She performed for several promotions like Melbourne City Wrestling (MCW), Shimmer, Rise, Riot City Wrestling (RCW), and World Series Wrestling (WSW).

=== WWE ===
==== NXT (2019–2023) ====
On 5 November 2019, it was reported that Hartwell signed a WWE contract. On 7 November, she made her debut at a NXT live event. On 15 January 2020 episode of NXT, she made her NXT televised debut by participating in the Number One Contender Battle Royal for the NXT Women's Championship in a losing effort.

On 7 October episode of NXT, a storyline began where Hartwell was seen assisting Candice LeRae in the Number One Contender Battle for the NXT Women's Championship at TakeOver 31. At Halloween Havoc, a masked figure wearing the Ghostface costume was seen assisting LeRae during her NXT Women's Championship match against Io Shirai but was fended off by the host of the event, Shotzi Blackheart. On 11 November, episode of NXT, it was revealed that Hartwell was the masked figure, aligning with LeRae in the process. On 9 December episode of NXT, Johnny Gargano revealed that he had formed a faction with Candice LeRae, Austin Theory and Hartwell called The Way.

On 22 January 2021 episode of 205 Live, Hartwell and LeRae defeated the team of Cora Jade and Gigi Dolin in the quarterfinals of the Women's Dusty Rhodes Tag Team Classic, which marked the first time that a women's match has ever taken place in the history of 205 Live brand. On 10 February episode of NXT, they were eliminated by Ember Moon and Blackheart in the semi-finals of the tournament. At TakeOver: Stand & Deliver, Hartwell and LeRae challenged Moon and Blackheart for the NXT Women's Tag Team Championship in a losing effort. On 27 April episode of NXT, Hartwell and LeRae attacked Blackheart and Moon; setting the stage for a future street fight match for the titles. On the next episode of NXT, they defeated the champions to win the NXT Women's Tag Team Championship, marking Hartwell's first championship in her WWE career. At The Great American Bash, the team of Io Shirai and Zoey Stark defeated Hartwell and LeRae, ending their reign at 63 days. At Halloween Havoc, Hartwell teamed with Persia Pirotta in a triple threat Scareway to Hell Ladder match against the Toxic Attraction (Gigi Dolin and Jacy Jayne) and the team of Shirai and Stark for NXT women's tag titles in a losing effort.

In 2022, Hartwell and Pirotta started a feud with Toxic Attraction which resulted in a match for women's tag team titles at Vengeance Day where they were unsuccessful in winning the match. They then entered Women's Dusty Rhodes Tag Team Classic; losing in the first round against the team of Dakota Kai and Wendy Choo. On 6 December episode of NXT, Hartwell defeated Fallon Henley and Wendy Choo in a triple threat match, earning a spot in the women's Iron Survivor Challenge at NXT Deadline. Four days later, at the event, Hartwell garnered a point over eventual winner Roxanne Perez.

In January 2023, Hartwell entered her first Royal Rumble match at the titular event, entering at number 26 and lasted for more than four minutes before being eliminated by Sonya Deville. On 21 March episode of NXT, Hartwell lost to Tiffany Stratton in a qualifying match for the NXT Women's Championship. However, the following week on NXT, Hartwell qualified for the match by defeating Ivy Nile and Sol Ruca in a Last Chance match. At Stand & Deliver, on 1 April, Hartwell won the NXT Women's Championship in a six-woman ladder match. At Spring Breakin' on 25 April, Hartwell retained the title against Stratton and Roxanne Perez in a triple threat match. Hartwell was injured during the match.

==== Main roster (2023–2024) ====
As part of the 2023 WWE Draft, Hartwell was drafted to the Raw brand. As a result, on 2 May episode of NXT, Hartwell relinquished the NXT Women's Championship; this ended her reign at only 31 days, making it the shortest in the title's history. Hartwell made her first Raw appearance during a backstage segment with Gargano, LeRae, and Lumis on 8 May episode. On 3 July episode of Raw, Hartwell made her in-ring debut, teaming with LeRae, lost to Sonya Deville and Chelsea Green.

In February 2024, Hartwell and LeRae challenged the WWE Women's Tag Team Champions The Kabuki Warriors for the titles At Elimination Chamber: Perth in a losing effort. During the 2024 WWE Draft, Hartwell and LeRae were assigned to SmackDown brand. At King and Queen of the Ring, Hartwell and LeRae lost another title match against the new tag team champions Bianca Belair and Jade Cargill. On 1 November, Hartwell was released from WWE. Her last match for the company was a tag team match with LeRae in a losing effort against Bayley and Naomi on SmackDown taped on 25 October and aired on the day of her release.

==== Return (2026-present) ====
After a two year hiatus, De Martin, reprising her role as Indi Hartwell, made her WWE return as a TNA contracted wrestler, on the 6 October 2026 episode of NXT in her first appearance since 2023, as a surprise entrant in the 20-woman Battle Royale to determine the number 1 contender for the NXT Women's Championship at Halloween Havoc.

=== Return to independent circuit (2025–present) ===
In March 2025, Hartwell returned to the independent circuit at We Are Renegades by Australian promotion Renegades of Wrestling (ROW), where she won the ROW Women's Championship by defeating the champion Aysha in the main event. In the same month, she made her debut for House of Glory (HOG) at its City of Dreamz event, losing to Mercedes Moné. On 9 May, during HOG's Waging War, Hartwell defeated Miyu Yamashita to win the vacant HOG Women's Championship. On 17 May, at the MJN center, in Poughkeepsie NY, Hartwell became the inaugural Awesome Championship Wrestling's Women's Champion.

=== Total Nonstop Action Wrestling (2025–present) ===
Hartwell made her debut for Total Nonstop Action Wrestling (TNA) on 27 April 2025 at Rebellion, where she appeared in the audience and announced that she had signed with the promotion. On 15 May episode of Impact!, Hartwell won her in-ring debut against Kelsey Heather. Eight days later at Under Siege, Hartwell teamed with The Rascalz (Trey Miguel and Zachary Wentz) and a returning Raj Singh and fought Order 4 (Mustafa Ali, Tasha Steelz, and The Great Hands (John Skylar and Jason Hotch)) in a losing effort. On 12 June episode of Impact!, Hartwell competed in a 8-4-1 match to determine the number one contender to Masha Slamovich's TNA Knockouts World Championship, which was won by Killer Kelly. At Slammiversary, Hartwell defeated Tessa Blanchard. On 15 August, at the Countdown to Emergence pre-show, Hartwell defeated Rosemary. At Bound for Glory on 11 October, Hartwell defeated Xia Brookside to win the TNA Knockouts World Championship, the first world championship in her career.

== Other media ==
De Martin, as Indi Hartwell, made her video game debut as a playable character in WWE 2K22 as DLC, and has since appeared in WWE 2K23, WWE 2K24, and WWE 2K25.

== Personal life ==
De Martin is of Chilean and Italian descent. According to Bayley, her match at NXT TakeOver: Brooklyn inspired De Martin to become a professional wrestler. She is a Universidad de Chile football club fan.

Since 2022, she has been in a relationship with a woman named Lissette. They both announced their engagement on 16 November 2025.

== Championships and accomplishments ==
- Awesome Championship Wrestling
  - ACW Women's Championship (1 time, inaugural)
- Battle Championship Wrestling
  - BCW Women's Championship (1 time)
  - BCW Women's Title Tournament (2018)
- House of Glory
  - HOG Women's Championship (1 time)
- Newcastle Pro Wrestling
  - Newcastle Pro Wrestling Women's Championship (1 time, inaugural)
  - Queen Of The Castle (2018)
- Pro Wrestling Illustrated
  - Ranked No. 46 of the top 250 female wrestlers in the PWI Women's 250 in 2023
- Rising Stars Women's Wrestling
  - Rising Stars Women's Championship (1 time)
- Renegades of Wrestling
  - ROW Women's Championship (1 time)
- Riot City Wrestling
  - RCW Women's Championship (1 time)
- Sans Restriction
  - Championnne Du Monde (1 time, inaugural, current)
- Total Nonstop Action Wrestling
  - TNA Knockouts World Championship (1 time, current)
- World Series Wrestling
  - WSW Women's Championship (1 time)
- WWE
  - NXT Women's Championship (1 time)
  - NXT Women's Tag Team Championship (1 time) – with Candice LeRae
