= ACW Women's Championship =

Details
- Promotion: Awesome Championship Wrestling
- Date established: May 7, 2025
- Current champion: Shotzi Blackheart
- Date won: October 18, 2026
Statistics
- First champion: Indi Hartwell
- Longest reign: Indi Hartwell (301 days)
- Shortest reign: Steph De Lander (235 days)
- Oldest champion: Shotzi Blackheart (34)
- Youngest champion: Indi Hartwell (29)

The ACW Women's Championship is the top women's title in the Poughkeepsie-based promotion Awesome Championship Wrestling. The first champion was Indi Hartwell, who won it at Aftershock in an elimination match at Aftershock. Her victory ushered in the ACW Women's Division. The current champion is Steph De Lander, who won it at the following year's Aftershock event by defeating Hartwell and J-Rod in a triple threat match.

== History ==
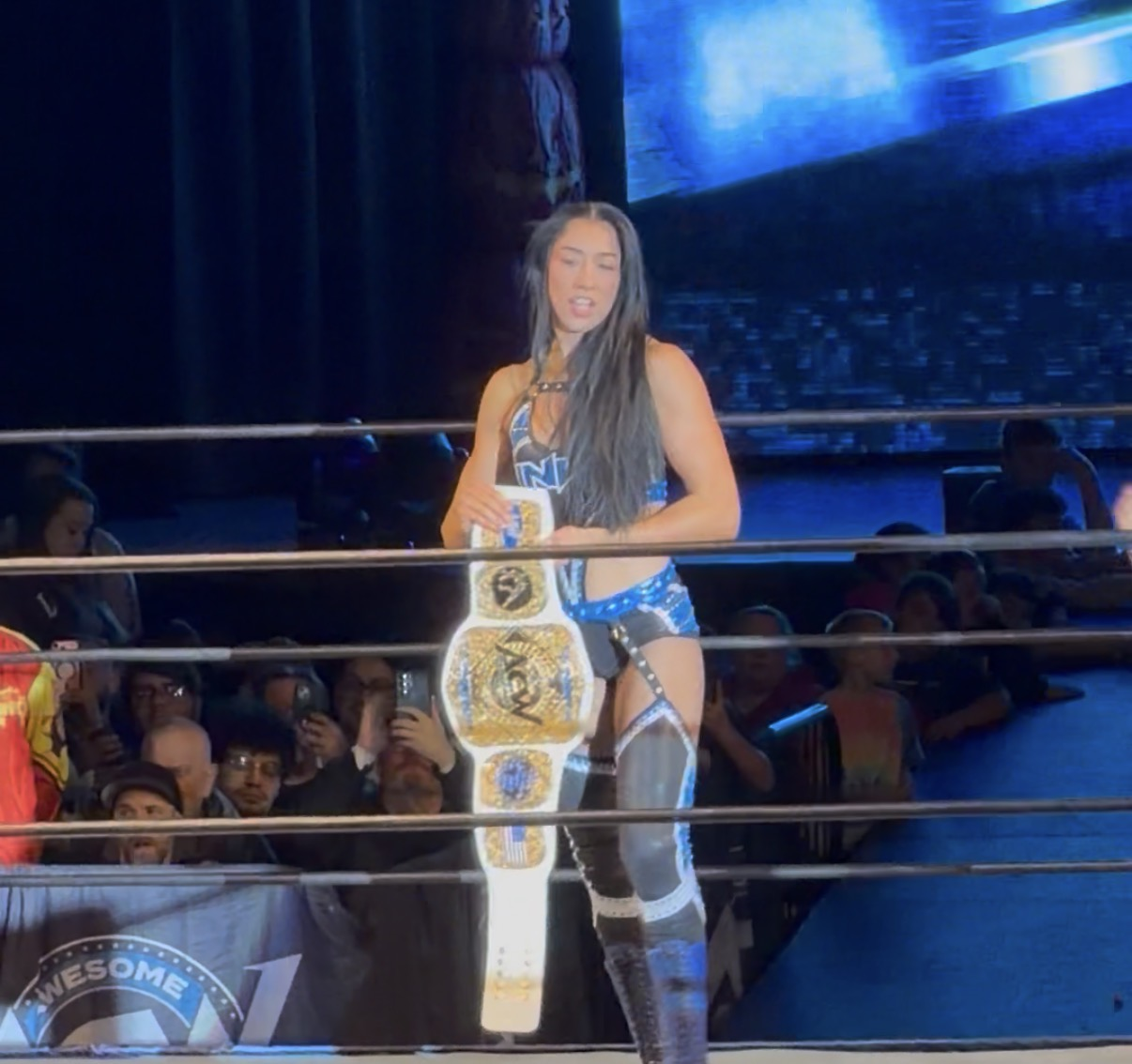
Indi Hartwell following her match at ACW Mischief Night.

ACW first revealed the championship design in a YouTube video posted on May 8, 2025.

The ACW Women's Championship was first contested at Awesome Championship Wrestling's second-ever show ACW Aftershock. In the inaugural match to determine the champion, a six-pack tag-team elimination match was held between Tina San Antonio, Indi Hartwell, Vicki Venuto, Rebecca J. Scott, Tiara James, and Kelly Madan. The first elimination was scored by Tiara James on Kelly Madan, after she reversed a roll-up attempt for a three-count. James held onto the rope to assist in the elimination, which was missed by the referee. While James was celebrating her victory, San Antonio entered the ring and unsuccessfully attempted to pin her via backslide. San Antonio was defeated by Vicki Venuto after she entered the ring and hit her finisher. After both women entered the ring and had a sequence, James eliminated Scott after once again using her feet on the ropes as leverage to secure her pin, without the referee noticing. Hartwell would enter the ring after the elimination of Scott, and eventually eliminate James after hitting her finisher. Believing Venuto had been eliminated, Hartwell began to celebrate before being attacked from behind. The match would end when Hartwell again hit her finisher to pick up the three-count, becoming the promotion's first Women's Champion.

Following her victory, Hartwell and Venuto would enter a feud ahead of ACW Fallout over the championship, which would be promoted by ACW's social media in April.

Steph De Lander left TNA Wrestling in March of 2026 after she had not wrestled since 2024 due to her neck injury. She and ACW's social media accounts posted about her in-ring return on March 9. De Lander posted a video to her social media, again challenging Hartwell for the ACW Women's Championship. A triple-threat match between Indi Hartwell, Steph De Lander, and J-Rod was created. At ACW Aftershock, Hartwell delivered a promo before the match, hyping up her reign while also congratulating her "best friend" Steph De Lander, but warning that her title will not be taken. Towards the end of the match, Vicki Venuto would run out to the ring and break up Hartwell's pin on De Lander by pulling the referee out. This would create chaos, allowing J-Rod to hit a massive spear on Indi Hartwell. J-Rod's pin attempt would be prevented by De Lander. The referee was distracted with the task of securing a turnbuckle pad, giving J-Rod the opportunity to take the title and attempt to hit De Lander across the head with it. She would miss, and hit Hartwell, taking her out of the rest of the match. Capitalizing, De Lander utilized her finishing maneuver on J-Rod and secured the victory for the championship.

To follow up their match and continue the various feuds between the four participants, a tag team match was declared for ACW Reckoning between the teams of SDL & Hartwell against Venuto and Frost.

While she has not yet defended her title as champion, De Lander is expected to appear on July 18's Indypendence Day show as champion.

== Reigns and statistics ==
#	Wrestler	Reign	Date	Days held	Location	Event	Notes	Ref.
1	Indi Hartwell	1	May 17, 2025	301 days	Poughkeepsie, New York	Aftershock 2025	First ACW Women's Champion.	
2	Steph De Lander	1	March 14, 2026	215 days	Poughkeepsie, New York	Aftershock 2026	Def. Hartwell in a triple-threat.	
3	Shotzi Blackheart	1	October 17,2026	18 days		Mischief Night 2		

=== Combined reigns ===
Rank	Wrestler	Reign(s)	Defenses	Combined days	Ref.
1	Indi Hartwell (Australia)	1	3	301 days	
2	Steph De Lander (Australia)	1	1	235 days	
