= ACW Tag Team Championship (Awesome) =

Tag team wrestling championship

Details
- Promotion: ACW
- Date established: May 17, 2025
- Current champion: The NOW
- Date won: October 18, 2025
Statistics
- First champion: Sent2Slaughter
- Longest reign: The NOW (241 days)
- Shortest reign: Sent2Slaughter (154 days)

The ACW Tag Team Championship is a men's professional wrestling tag team championship created by and defended for Awesome Championship Wrestling. The championships were created in May 2025 and competed for at ACW Aftershock: Battle for the Belts. The current champions are The NOW, who defeated the inaugural champions Sent2Slaughter at ACW Mischief Night on October 18, 2025.

== History ==
The ACW Tag Team Championship was first presented at ACW Aftershock: Battle for the Belts on May 17, 2025 in a steel cage match between longtime rivals Sent2Slaughter (Danny Maff and Shawn Donavn) and The NOW (Hale Collins and Vik Dalishus). The two teams had previously engaged in battle at events leading up to Aftershock, but this was the first title for the ACW Tag Team championship.

Sent2Slaughter, The NOW, The Righteous, and the Hardy Boyz began a feud in early 2026, with each team releasing video promos against each other ahead of an 8-man tag team match announced for March 14, 2026 at ACW Aftershock.

At Reckoning, The NOW defended their tag team titles against Sent2Slaughter once again.

=== Reigns ===
#	Wrestler	Reign	Date	Days held	Location	Event	Notes	Ref.
1	Sent2Slaughter (Dan Maff & Shawn Donavan)	1	May 17, 2025	154 days	Poughkeepsie, New York	Poughkeepsie Rumble	Defeated The NOW in a steel cage match.	
2	The NOW (Hale Collins & Vik Dalishus)	1	October 18, 2025	241 days	Poughkeepsie, New York	Mischief Night	Defeated Sent2Slaughter in a ladder match.	
