= Richard Holliday =

American wrestler (born 1992)

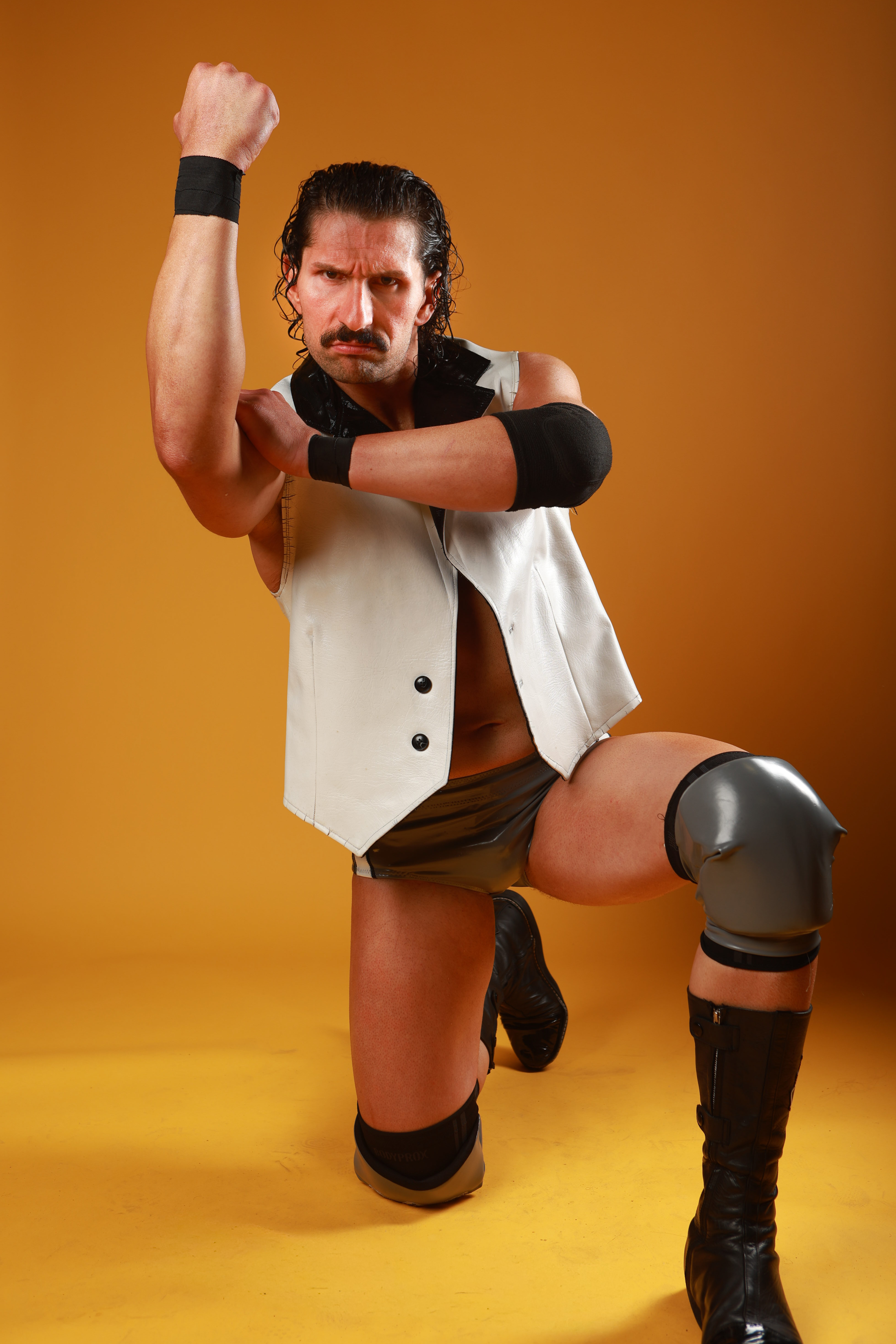
- Holliday in 2026

Personal information
- Born: Joe Zimbardi; November 8, 1992 (age 34) New Haven, Connecticut, U.S.

Professional wrestling career
- Billed height: 6 ft 3 in (191 cm)
- Billed weight: 237 lb (108 kg)
- Billed from: Westport, Connecticut
- Trained by: Paul Roma; Mario Mancini; Paradise Alley Professional Wrestling School
- Debut: December 12, 2015

Joe Zimbardi (born November 8, 1992), better known by the ring name Richard Holliday, is an American professional wrestler. He performs on the independent circuit. He is best known for his tenure in Major League Wrestling, where he is a former one-time MLW World Tag Team Champion.

Holliday is a former two-time ACW Heavyweight Champion, a one-time IWA World Heavyweight Champion and one-time IWA Caribbean Heavyweight Champion.

== Professional wrestling career ==
=== Independent circuit (2015–present) ===
After undergoing training under former WCW World Tag Team Champion Paul Roma and the Paradise Alley Professional Wrestling School, Holliday made his professional wrestling debut for Northeast Wrestling at Christmas in Tavenville event on December 12, 2015, in a losing effort against Jym Anderson. Holliday wrestled for various independent promotions and made frequent appearances for New England Championship Wrestling, where he challenged for the NECW Television Championship on many occasions. Holliday's first major achievement in his professional wrestling career came when he participated in East Coast Wrestling Association's (ECWA) 2018 Super 8 Tournament on April 21, 2018. Holliday won the tournament by defeating Bolt Brady in the quarter-final, Anthony Greene in the semi-final and Chase Owens in the final.

On September 21, 2019, Holliday defeated Brute VanSlyke to win the Immortal Championship Wrestling (ICW) Heavyweight Championship at Immortal 08 event. The following month, at Halloween Havok, Holliday successfully defended the title against Carlito before dropping the title to Sean Carr in an immediate title defense.

=== Major League Wrestling (2018–2024) ===
Holliday signed a contract with Major League Wrestling (MLW) in 2018, making his debut for the promotion at the inaugural Battle Riot event on July 27, entering at #17. He was eliminated by Barrington Hughes. Holliday's first singles match in MLW took place on the September 7 episode of Fusion, which he lost to Fred Yehi.

On the February 16, 2019 episode of Fusion, Holliday formed an alliance with Maxwell Jacob Friedman by attacking Teddy Hart during a post-match interview backstage after Hart had retained the World Middleweight Championship against MJF. Their alliance was dubbed The Dynasty and they began a lengthy feud with Hart's faction The Hart Foundation, setting up a World Tag Team Championship match between the two teams on the March 16 episode of Fusion, which MJF and Holliday lost via disqualification after Alexander Hammerstone interfered in the match by attacking Hart and Smith, therefore Hammerstone joined the Dynasty, making it a trio. On April 5, Holliday participated in the Battle Riot match as the #40 entrant. He was eliminated by Davey Boy Smith, Jr. On the April 27 episode of Fusion, Dynasty defeated Hart Foundation in a six-man tables match to hand Hart Foundation, their first loss as a team in MLW. On the July 13 episode of Fusion, MJF and Holliday defeated Brian Pillman Jr. and Teddy Hart in a ladder match to capture the World Tag Team Championship. They successfully defended the titles against Hart Foundation in a two out of three falls match on the September 21 episode of Fusion and the Los Parks (LA Park and El Hijo de LA Park) on the October 12 episode of Fusion, before losing the titles to The Von Erichs (Ross and Marshall) in a Texas Tornado match at the Saturday Night SuperFight pay-per-view on November 2. On November 21, it was announced that Holliday would enter the inaugural Opera Cup tournament against Timothy Thatcher. The match took place on the December 14 episode of Fusion, which Holliday lost.

On the February 8, 2020 episode of Fusion, Holliday defeated Savio Vega and then stole Vega's IWA Caribbean Heavyweight Championship belt, unofficially claiming himself to be the Caribbean Heavyweight Champion. He successfully defended the title against Chessman in a no disqualification match on the April 25 episode of Fusion. Holliday began campaigning for the title to be officially recognized by MLW. On May 18, Holliday renewed his MLW contract to a multi-year deal. In November, Holliday participated in the 2020 Opera Cup tournament, defeating TJP in the quarter-final, but lost to Low Ki in the semi-final.

On January 27, 2021, Holliday defeated Vega due to the intervention of referee Tim Donaghy, beginning his first official reign after 382 days of illegally possessing the belt. He remained champion until Battle Riot III, where he lost a defense to King Muertes. On July 31, 2021, Holliday made his IWA-PR debut at the La Gran Amenaza event by defeating Mr. Big for the IWA World Heavyweight Championship.

On January 21, 2022 at Blood & Thunder, Holliday and on-screen girlfriend Alicia Atout attacked Hammerstone, thus dissolving The Dynasty and turning heel.

After Alex Kane retained his MLW World Heavyweight Championship against Matt Cardona at One Shot, Holliday made his return to MLW and attacked Kane and in the process, aligned himself with World Titan Federation (WTF). His new manager Mister Saint Laurent then said that at Kings of Colliseum on January 6 2024, Holliday will challenge Kane for the MLW World Heavyweight Championship.

== Personal life ==
Zimbardi played college football at the University of New Haven.

In December 2022, Zimbardi revealed in an interview with Sports Illustrated that he had been ill since June and his disease was diagnosed as the stage four Hodgkin's lymphoma in September. He was undergoing chemotherapy to treat the cancer.

== Championships and accomplishments ==
- Fight Life Pro Wrestling
  - FL World Championship (1 time)
- New South Pro Wrestling
  - Heart Of The Southern Sixteen Tournament (2024)
- NWA Exodus Pro Midwest
  - NWA Midwest Heavyweight Championship (1 time, current)
- Beyond Championship Wrestling
  - BCW Heavyweight Championship (1 time, inaugural, final)
  - BCW Heavyweight Championship Tournament (2020)
- Big Time Wrestling
  - BTW Heavyweight Championship (1 time)
- East Coast Wrestling Association
  - Super 8 Tournament (2018)
- Major League Wrestling
  - MLW World Tag Team Championship (1 time) – with MJF
  - IWA Caribbean Heavyweight Championship (1 time)
- Independent Superstars Of Pro Wrestling
  - ISPW Heavyweight Championship (1 time)
  - ISPW Heavyweight Title Tournament (2023)
- Immortal Championship Wrestling
  - ICW Heavyweight Championship (1 time)
- Awesome Championship Wrestling
  - ACW Heavyweight Championship (2 time, inaugural)
- International Wrestling Association
  - IWA World Heavyweight Championship (1 time)
- Dynamic Over-The-Top Action Wrestling
  - DOA UK Heavyweight Championship (1 time)
- Paradise Alley Pro Wrestling
  - PAPW Heavyweight Championship (1 time, inaugural)
  - PAPW Heavyweight Title Tournament (2016)
- Pro Wrestling Illustrated
  - Ranked him No. 112 of the top 500 singles wrestlers in the PWI 500 in 2021
- Reality of Wrestling
  - ROW Legacy Championship (1 time)
