= ACW World Heavyweight Championship =

Professional wrestling championship

ACW Heavyweight Championship

Details
- Promotion: ACW
- Date established: January 4, 2025
- Current champion: Killer Kross
- Date won: March 14, 2026
Statistics
- First champion: Richard Holliday
- Most reigns: Richard Holliday (2)
- Longest reign: Richard Holliday (287 days)
- Shortest reign: Richard Holliday (70 days)
- Oldest champion: Matt Cardona (40)
- Youngest champion: Richard Holliday (33)
- Heaviest champion: Killer Kross - 265 lbs
- Lightest champion: Matt Cardona - 230 lbs

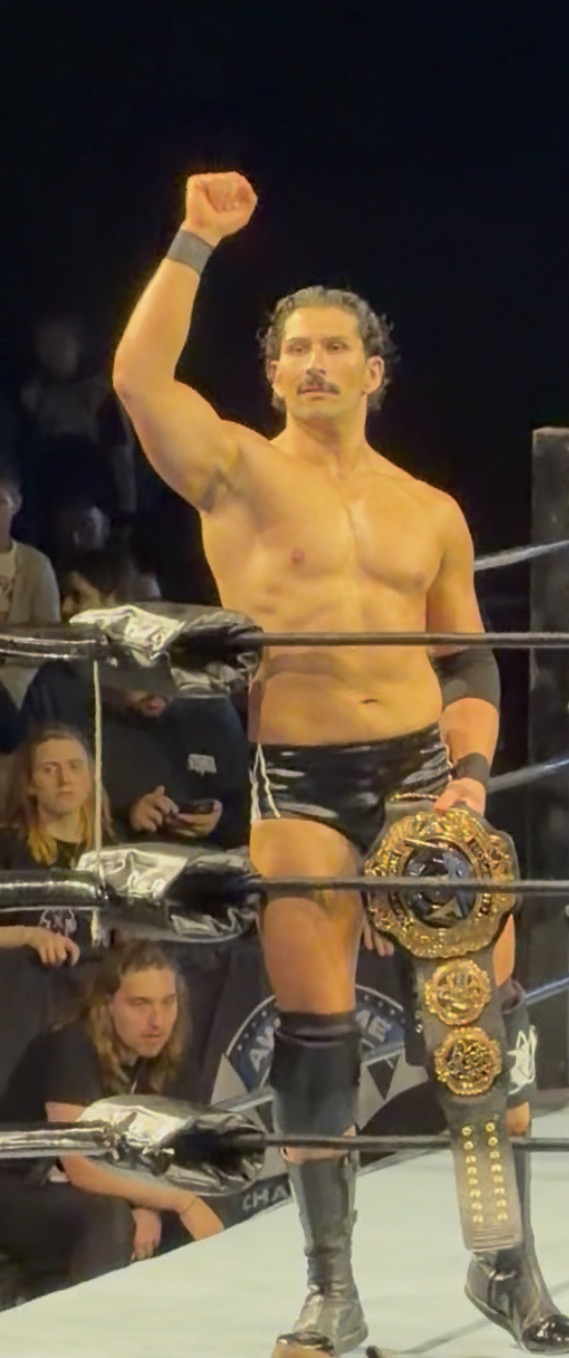
Inaugural ACW Champion, Richard Holliday.

The ACW Heavyweight Championship is a professional wrestling championship created and promoted by Awesome Championship Wrestling, a promotion in Poughkeepsie, New York. It is the promotion's highest-regarded title. The inaugural champion was Richard Holliday, who won the title on January 4, 2025 after winning the 2025 Poughkeepsie Rumble. Holliday has also held the championship the longest, at a combined 357 days across his two reigns. The current ACW Champion is Killer Kross, who won the title after defeating the previous reigning champion Richard Holliday as well as Mike Santana at Aftershock 2026.

== History ==
The ACW Heavyweight Championship was inaugurated on January 4, 2025 at the first annual ACW Poughkeepsie Rumble. The main event of the show was a twenty-man over-the-top-rope battle royal match. The rumble match would last for forty minutes, and the final two in the ring would be Richard Holliday and Wrecking Ball Legursky. A new match would begin between the two, where Holliday pinned Legursky and became the first ACW Heavyweight champion. After defeating Legursky, Holliday would only have a few moments to celebrate his victory before Matt Cardona announced via titantron that he would attempt to gain the ACW Championship the next show, Aftershock.

Holliday would defend his title against Matt Cardona at Aftershock 2025. At the climax of the match, Holliday grabbed the championship belt and prepared to hit Cardona in the head with it. If he were to do so, he would be disqualified and the title would not change hands. In his attempt to hit Cardona, Holliday would accidentally smash the title across the referee's face, giving Cardona the opportunity to hit his finisher Radio Silence and go for the cover. Cardona technically pinned Holliday, however it was a visible fall, and due to there not being an active referee to count it, the victory was not valid. While attempting to wake up the referee, Cardona himself was blindsided with the championship belt by Holliday, who then called another referee into the ring for a near-fall of two. Enraged, Holliday would take out the new referee with a low-blow, before rolling out of the ring, retrieving a chair, and beating Cardona with it. Despite this, Cardona would fight out and hit another Radio Silence for a near-fall. Holliday would retain the title after Cardona was in a dispute with the referee, which allowed him to hit his finisher and pin the challenger.

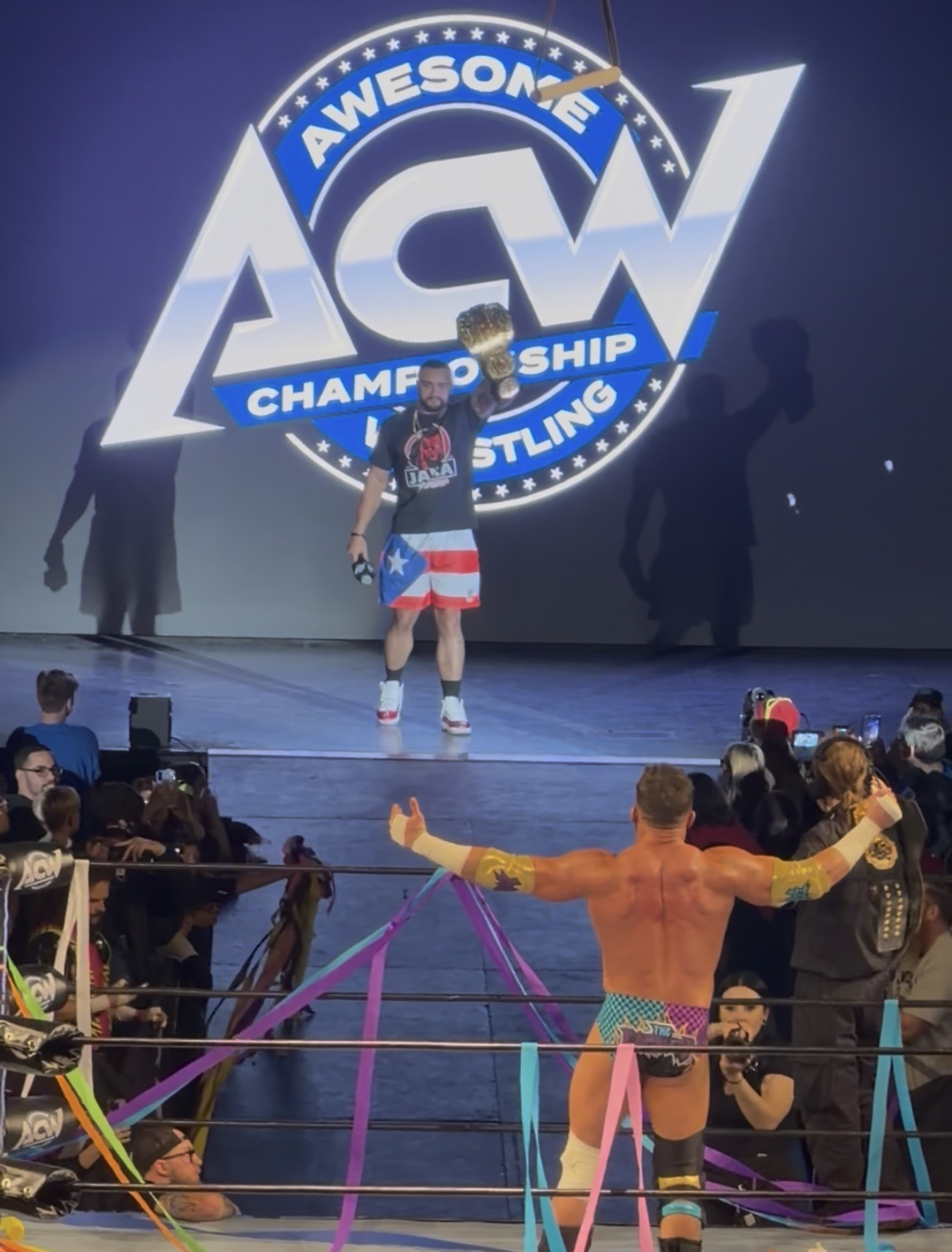
ACW Champion Matt Cardona being challenged by TNA World Champion Mike Santana after defeating Holliday.

On June 2, MLW World Heavyweight Champion Matt Riddle announced he would be competing in a match against Holliday at ACW Fallout. At the live event, held on July 18, Riddle would pin Holliday after using an RKO, winning the match. The result would be overturned as previously in the match, Holliday hit a low-blow on the referee following a call he disagreed with, and ultimately, he was announced the winner via disqualification. His reign would continue for another ninety-two days leading into the next pay-per-view. In the lead up to the event, in addition to Matt Riddle demanding a rematch, Matt Cardona and Nic Nemeth would also declare themselves as competitors for the title in a match, creating a Fatal Four Way. At Mischief Night, Cardona would defeat Holliday via pinfall after spending the majority of the match absent, and become the new ACW Champion.

Following Cardona's victory at Mischief Night, TNA World Champion Mike Santana would make an appearance (after previously defeating Brian Myers earlier in the night) and challenge him to a title vs title match on January 3 at the Poughkeepsie Rumble on January 3. This match would ultimately not happen, as Cardona would be re-signed to WWE on January 2, causing the title to be vacated ahead of their match. At the Rumble, a No. 1 Contendership. Match would be held to determine who would challenge the winner of the Rumble match. In a fifteen-minute match, Santana would defeat Nic Nemeth, becoming the challenger for the victor of the battle royale. In the Rumble, Dante Casanova and Richard Holliday became the final two contenders, and Holliday would go on to defeat Casanova and begin his second reign as champion. After his victory, while cutting a victory promo, he would be interrupted via titantron by Killer Kross, where he challenged Holliday to a match at ACW Aftershock. Santana would return to the arena and assert he would still be in contention for the title, stating, "March 14th: Killer Kross. Mike Santana. Richard Holiday. Triple Threat, ACW Heavyweight Title."

At Aftershock 2026, Richard Holliday would enter alongside Ben Bishop as ACW champion while Kross would be accompanied to the ring by his wife Scarlett Bordeaux as MLW World Heavyweight Champion, and Santana as TNA World Champion. Kross would win the match after defeating Holliday via submission and become the new ACW World Heavyweight Champion. While the match was a triple threat match between three champions, only the ACW title was on the line. Kross would defend the title at Future Stars of Wrestling's streamed event Mecca XI: Killer Instinct in a match against Zilla Fatu. In addition to the ACW Championship, he would also be defending the Romanian Pro Wrestling Championship and the MLW World Heavyweight Championship, which he won at Battle Riot VIII. Kross defeated Fatu via submission.

== Reigns and statistics ==
Current champion Killer Kross.

Richard Holliday was the first champion and has held the title for the longest at 287 days in his first reign. Holliday is also a record two-time ACW champion and holds the record for most (combined) days as champion, at 357. Holliday has also had the shortest reign at seventy days. The oldest ACW Champion at time of winning is Matt Cardona at age forty, while Holliday was the youngest at 33. The current champion is Killer Kross, who defeated Richard Holliday and TNA Champion Mike Santana at Aftershock.

#	Wrestler	Reign	Date	Days held	Location	Event	Notes	Ref.
1	Richard Holliday	1	January 4, 2025	287 days	Poughkeepsie, New York	Poughkeepsie Rumble	Defeated Wrecking Ball Legursky following a Battle Royale match.	
2	Matt Cardona	1	October 18, 2025	77 days	Poughkeepsie, New York	Mischief Night	Defeated Richard Holliday (c), Matt Riddle, and Nic Nemeth in a Fatal Four Way in the main event.	
—	Vacated	—	January 3, 2026	—	Poughkeepsie, New York	Poughkeepsie Rumble	Cardona vacated his title after re-signing with WWE.	
3	Richard Holliday	2	January 3, 2026	70 days	Poughkeepsie, New York	Poughkeepsie Rumble	Defeated Dante Casanova.	
4	Killer Kross	1	March 14, 2026	182 days	Poughkeepsie, New York	Aftershock 2026	Defeated Richard Holliday (c) and Mike Santana in a Triple Threat match.	

=== Combined reigns ===
Rank	Wrestler	Reign(s)	Defenses	Combined days
1	Richard Holliday (United States)	2	2	357 days
2	Killer Kross (United States)	1	1	182 days
3	Matt Cardona (United States)	1	0	77 days
