= Awesome Championship Wrestling =

American professional wrestling promotion

- Founded: 2024
- Style: Indie wrestling
- Headquarters: (New York (state)) Poughkeepsie, New York
- Founder(s): Hale Collins and Vik Dalishus
- Website: thisisacw.com

Awesome Championship Wrestling (ACW) is an American professional wrestling promotion based in Poughkeepsie, New York and operates in the Hudson Valley from the historic MJN Convention Center. It was founded in 2024 by Hale Collins and Vik Dalishus, who are both members of The Now, a tag-team founded in the indies in 2006.

ACW currently distributes its events on Triller TV and uploads some free matches to YouTube.

== History ==
The promotion's first live event was named the Poughkeepsie Rumble, which took place on January 4, 2025, and aired on TrillerTV on February 2, 2025 at the MJN Convention Center in Poughkeepsie, New York. The match card consisted of nine matches, four of them being title matches. The opener was a triple threat match between NWA World Junior Heavyweight Champion Alex Taylor, Gil Kay Marcels, and real1. Taylor retained in a four-minute match. In a six-man tag team match, the FBI defeated the team of Danny Doring, Dante Casanova, and Landon Hale. Crowbar defeated Anthony Greene while Kelly Madan defeated Tiara James. For the NWA World's Heavyweight Championship match, champion Thom Latimer would lose to Tommy Dreamer via disqualification. The NOW (Hale Collins and Vik Dalishus) and Sent2Slaughter (Dan Maff and Shawn Donavan) would have a tables match, where the NOW would claim victory. The seventh match, a 20-Man Over the Top Rope Poughkeepsie Rumble Match, would see the inaugural ACW Heavyweight Champion be crowned. Richard Holiday and Wrecking Ball Legursky would be the final two in the match, defeating (among others) Brad Baylor, Brian Myers, Dante Casanova, and Tony DeVito. The rumble match would go for forty minutes. Following the match, Holiday and WBL would compete for the title, and Holiday would win. The final match and main event of the night featured TNA World Champion Nic Nemeth defending his title against Matt Riddle, winning.

The next ACW event would be held only five months later on May 17, 2025, titled ACW Aftershock: Battle for the Belts. Four titles would be contested for; the ACW Women's Championship in a six-pack elimination challenge, the ACW National Championship in a Fatal Four Way match, the Tag Team Championship in a steel cage match, and the ACW Heavyweight Championship. The six-pack challenge would be won by Indi Hartwell, who became the Women's Champion. Real1 defeated Ben Bishop, Dante Casanova, and Landon Hale to become the National Champion, while the NOW were defeated by Sent2Slaughter for the Tag Titles. Indi Hartwell won the Women's Championship, and in the main event, Richard Holliday retained his title against Matt Cardona in a twenty-minute match.

== Championships and accomplishments ==
The longest reigning champion across all titles is Indi Hartwell, who held the ACW Women's Championship for 301 days between May of 2025 and March of 2026. The shortest reign was Richard Holliday's second as champion at 70 days. Holliday also holds the record for longest combined reign (ACW Championship) at 357 days.

Championship	Current champion	Reign	Date won	Days held	Location	Notes	Ref.
ACW Heavyweight Championship	Killer Kross	1	March 14, 2026	241 days	Poughkeepsie, New York	Kross defeated Richard Holliday (c) and Mike Santana at ACW Aftershock.	
ACW Women's Championship	Steph De Lander	1	March 14, 2026	241 days	Poughkeepsie, New York	De Lander defeats Indi Hartwell (c) and J-Rod at ACW Aftershock.	
ACW National Championship	Zack Clayton	1	May 16, 2026	311 days	Poughkeepsie, New York	Zack Clayton (c) defeats Dante Casanova at ACW Reckoning.	
ACW Cruiserweight Championship	Fear	1	July 18, 2026	115 days	Poughkeepsie, New York	Fear defeats Leo Sparrow (c) at ACW’s INDYpendence Day.	
ACW Tag Team Championship	NOW	1	May 16, 2026	178 days	Poughkeepsie, New York	No contest against Sent2Slaughter (Danny Maff & Shawn Donavan) at ACW Reckoning.	
