= Mae Young Classic (2018) =

2018 professional wrestling tournament

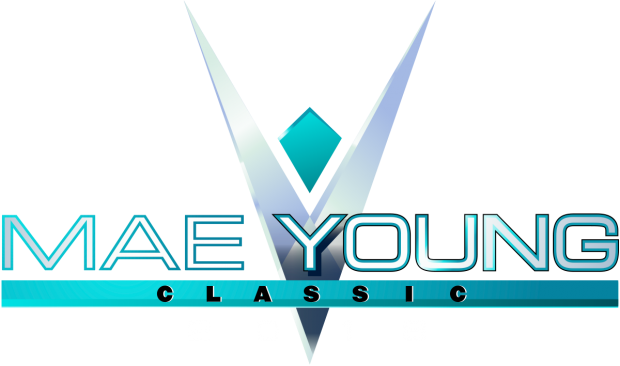
- Official logo
- Date: August 8–9, 2018 (aired September 5 – October 4); October 28, 2018 (final)
- City: Winter Park, Florida; Uniondale, New York (final)
- Venue: Full Sail University; Nassau Veterans Memorial Coliseum (final)

Mae Young Classic chronology
| ← Previous; 2017 | Next → Final |

The 2018 Mae Young Classic was a multi-night special event and tournament promoted by the American professional wrestling promotion, WWE. It was the second Mae Young Classic tournament produced and was constituted by a 32-competitor tournament exclusively for women from WWE's NXT brand division and wrestlers from the independent circuit. The tournament took place at Full Sail University in Winter Park, Florida and was taped on August 8–9, 2018 and aired on the WWE Network from September 5 to October 4 (round 1, round 2, quarterfinals, and semifinals). The tournament final match aired live as part of WWE's all-female pay-per-view Evolution, which was held on October 28 at the Nassau Veterans Memorial Coliseum in Uniondale, New York. One of the producers of the tournament was Sarah Stock. The winner of this second tournament was Toni Storm.

== Background ==
In 2017, the American professional wrestling promotion WWE held a 32-woman tournament called the Mae Young Classic. It involved wrestlers from WWE's NXT brand and wrestlers from the independent circuit. The event was named in honor of the late WWE Hall of Famer Mae Young, who is considered a pioneer of women's wrestling. In April 2018, WWE announced a second Mae Young Classic tournament, following up on the 2017 tournament.

On June 22, 2018, WWE confirmed the tournament would once again have 32 competitors from NXT and the independent circuit, with the event being held at Full Sail University in Winter Park, Florida on August 8–9. On July 12, the first two competitors for the 2018 tournament were announced as Kaitlyn and Rhea Ripley. The tournament final match was scheduled to be held as part of WWE's all-female pay-per-view Evolution, taking place on October 28 at the Nassau Veterans Memorial Coliseum in Uniondale, New York.

On August 8, it was announced that the show would air every Wednesday on the WWE Network immediately after NXT, beginning September 5. Beth Phoenix, Renee Young, and Michael Cole were confirmed as the commentators for the event. In addition, the week prior to the first episode, WWE Network aired a bracketology special.

== Qualifying match ==
NXT tapings – July 18 (Full Sail University – Winter Park, Florida)
| No. | Results | Stipulations |
|---|---|---|
| 1 | Taynara Conti defeated Vanessa Borne | Mae Young Classic Final Spot Qualifying Match |

== Participants ==
| Wrestler | Country representing | Ref |
|---|---|---|
| Aerial Monroe | United States | |
| Allysin Kay | United States | |
| Ashley Rayne | United States | |
| Deonna Purrazzo | United States | |
| Hiroyo Matsumoto | Japan | |
| Io Shirai | Japan | |
| Isla Dawn | Scotland | |
| Jessie Elaban | United States | |
| Jinny | England | |
| Kacy Catanzaro | United States | |
| Kaitlyn | United States | |
| Karen Q | United States | |
| Kavita Devi | India | |
| Killer Kelly | Portugal | |
| Lacey Lane | United States | |
| M. J. Jenkins | United States | |
| Meiko Satomura | Japan | |
| Mercedes Martinez | United States | |
| Mia Yim | United States | |
| Nicole Matthews | Canada | |
| Priscilla Kelly | United States | |
| Rachel Evers | United States | |
| Reina González | United States | |
| Rhea Ripley | Australia | |
| Taynara Conti | Brazil | |
| Tegan Nox | Wales | |
| Toni Storm | Australia | |
| Vanessa Kraven | Canada | |
| Xia Brookside | England | |
| Xia Li | China | |
| Zatara | Chile | |
| Zeuxis | Puerto Rico | |

== Broadcast team ==
| Ring name | Real name | Notes |
|---|---|---|
| Beth Phoenix | Elizabeth Kociański | Color commentator Hall of Famer |
| Cathy Kelley | Catherine Kelley | Backstage interviewer |
| Kayla Braxton | Kayla Becker | Ring announcer |
| Michael Cole | Michael Coulthard | Lead commentator |
| Renee Young | Renee Paquette | Color commentator |
| Sarah Schreiber | Sarah Schreiber | Backstage interviewer |
| Shadia Bseiso | Shadia Bseiso | Backstage interviewer |

== Tournament bracket ==
1st Round (Note: The first round of the tournament had a time limit of fifteen minutes.); Mae Young Classic; August 8, 2018 (Aired: September 5–26)
(Japan) Meiko Satomura | Pinfall
(Portugal) Killer Kelly | 7:41
(United States) Ashley Rayne | 7:31
(United States) Mercedes Martinez | Pinfall
(United States) Lacey Lane | Pinfall
(Canada) Vanessa Kraven | 4:50
(Brazil) Taynara Conti | Pinfall
(United States) Jessie Elaban | 4:44
(Australia) Toni Storm | Pinfall
(England) Jinny | 7:08
(United States) Rachel Evers | 9:47
(Japan) Hiroyo Matsumoto | Pinfall
(South Korea) Mia Yim | Pinfall
(United States) Allysin Kay | 9:39
(United States) Kaitlyn | Pinfall
(India) Kavita Devi | 4:08
(Wales) Tegan Nox | Pinfall
(Chile) Zatara | 6:10
(Scotland) Isla Dawn | 7:20
(Canada) Nicole Matthews | Submission
(Australia) Rhea Ripley | Pinfall
(United States) MJ Jenkins | 7:41
(United States) Kacy Catanzaro | Pinfall
(United States) Reina González | 4:46
(Japan) Io Shirai | Pinfall
(England) Xia Brookside | 3:16
(Puerto Rico) Zeuxis | Pinfall
(United States) Aerial Monroe | 5:06
(United States) Deonna Purrazzo | Submission
(United States) Priscilla Kelly | 4:28
(United States) Karen Q | 4:21
(China) Xia Li | Pinfall

2nd Round (Note: The second round of the tournament had a time limit of twenty minutes.); Mae Young Classic; August 9, 2018 (Aired: October 3–10)
(Japan) Meiko Satomura | Pinfall
(United States) Mercedes Martinez | 11:32
(United States) Lacey Lane | Pinfall
(Brazil) Taynara Conti | 2:38
(Australia) Toni Storm | Pinfall
(Japan) Hiroyo Matsumoto | 9:17
(South Korea) Mia Yim | Submission
(United States) Kaitlyn | 7:09
(Wales) Tegan Nox | Pinfall
(Canada) Nicole Matthews | 3:45
(Australia) Rhea Ripley | Pinfall
(United States) Kacy Catanzaro | 7:04
(Japan) Io Shirai | Pinfall
(Mexico) Zeuxis | 6:06
(United States) Deonna Purrazzo | Submission
(China) Xia Li | 5:45

Quarterfinals (Note: The quarterfinals of the tournament had a time limit of twenty-five minutes.); Mae Young Classic; August 9, 2018 (Aired: October 17)
(Japan) Meiko Satomura | Pinfall
(United States) Lacey Lane | 4:34
(Australia) Toni Storm | Pinfall
(South Korea) Mia Yim | 8:25
(Wales) Tegan Nox | 3:14
(Australia) Rhea Ripley | Knockout
(Japan) Io Shirai | Pinfall
(United States) Deonna Purrazzo | 8:44

Semifinals; Mae Young Classic; August 9, 2018 (Aired: October 24)
(Japan) Meiko Satomura | 13:05
(Australia) Toni Storm | Pinfall
(Australia) Rhea Ripley | 12:52
(Japan) Io Shirai | Pinfall

Final; Evolution; October 28, 2018
(Australia) Toni Storm | Pinfall
(Japan) Io Shirai | 10:20

== Aftermath ==
Performers on the tournament such as Deonna Purrazzo, Io Shirai, Jessie Elaban, Kacy Catanzaro, Kavita Devi, Lacey Lane, MJ Jenkins, Reina González, Rhea Ripley, Taynara Conti, Tegan Nox, and Xia Li already had signed contracts with the company. While Xia Brookside, Isla Dawn, Jinny, Killer Kelly, and winner Toni Storm had signed contracts with the company, performing on the NXT UK brand.

On August 25, 2018, Rhea Ripley started competing on the NXT UK brand, where she would eventually become the inaugural NXT UK Women's Champion.

On October 18, 2018, WWE announced that Mia Yim had been signed to a contract, performing on the NXT and NXT UK brand.

In February 2019, WWE announced that Karen Q signed to contract and training at the WWE Performance Center later September 4, 2026, She was released by WWE

In September 2024, Total Nonstop Action Wrestling (TNA) announced that Léi Ying Lee (Zhao Xia during the Mae Young Classic) signed with the company.

In December 2021, AEW announced that Mercedes Martinez signed to contract All Elite Wrestling.

On April 15, 2020, Deonna Purrazzo was released from her contract. Two days later, Taynara Conti and M.J Jenkins were also released from their contract as part of budget cuts due to the COVID-19 pandemic.

On January 20, 2021, NXT announced they had signed Priscilla Kelly, where she would be competing under the new ring name Gigi Dolin.
