= Dakota Kai =

Kiwi professional wrestler (born 1988)

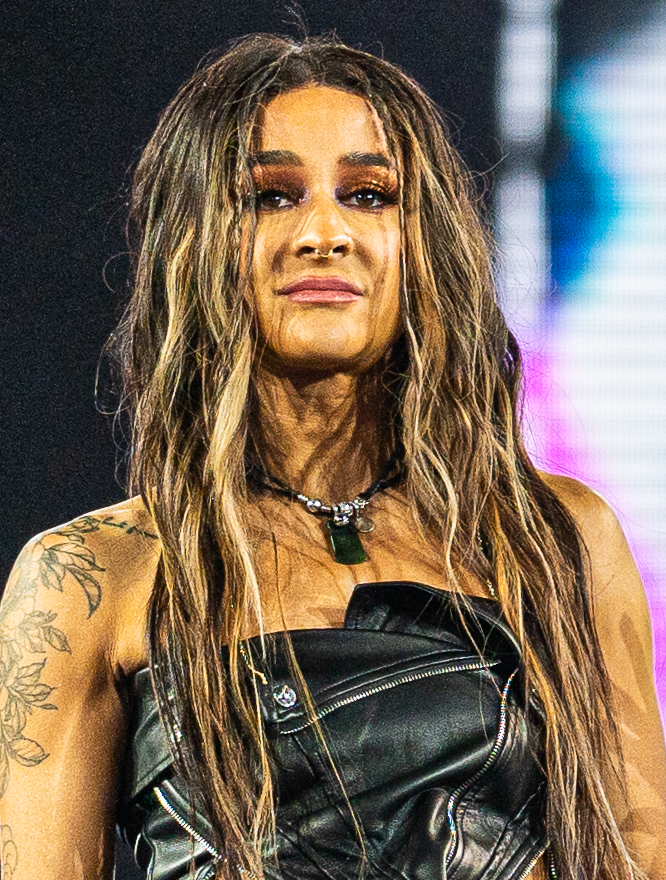
- Kai in 2024

Personal information
- Born: Cheree Georgina Crowley; 6 May 1988 (age 38) Auckland, New Zealand
- Life partner: Karl Fredericks

Professional wrestling career
- Ring name(s): Charlie; Dakota Kai; Evie
- Billed height: 5 ft 6 in (1.68 m)
- Billed weight: 121 lb (55 kg)
- Billed from: Auckland, New Zealand
- Trained by: Impact Pro Wrestling; WWE Performance Center
- Debut: 15 December 2007

Twitch information
- Channel: charliegirl
- Years active: 2016–present
- Genres: Gaming; Just Chatting
- Followers: 85.7 thousand
- Last updated: 30 June 2026

Cheree Georgina Crowley (born 6 May 1988) is a New Zealand professional wrestler. She is performing on the independent circuit under the ring name Charlie. She is best known for her tenure in WWE, where she performed under the ring name Dakota Kai.

Before signing with WWE, Crowley performed under the ring name Evie and appeared for Impact Pro Wrestling (IPW) in her native New Zealand, Pro Wrestling Women's Alliance (PWA) in Australia, American promotions Shimmer Women Athletes and Shine Wrestling, as well as Japanese promotions Pro Wrestling Zero1 and World Wonder Ring Stardom.

Crowley signed with WWE in 2016, where she adopted the ring name Dakota Kai and participated in the Mae Young Classic. She was then assigned to the NXT brand, where she became the inaugural winner of the Women's Dusty Rhodes Tag Team Classic, and the inaugural and two-time NXT Women's Tag Team Champion alongside Raquel Gonzalez.

Crowley was released from WWE in April 2022 but returned to the company that July and joined the main roster, where she became part of the stable Damage CTRL. As part of the stable, she became a two-time WWE Women's Tag Team Champion with Iyo Sky. Crowley was once again released from WWE in May 2025.

== Professional wrestling career ==
=== Independent circuit (2007–2017) ===
Crowley made her professional wrestling debut on 15 December 2007 for Auckland based company Impact Pro Wrestling under the ring name Evie, a reference to her favourite Pokémon, Eevee.

In September 2011, she debuted in Sydney, Australia-based Pro Wrestling Alliance Australia (PWA Australia) for their annual PWWA show, where she defeated Kellie Skater. In August 2012, Evie became the first Impact Pro Wrestling NZ Women's Champion, defeating Britenay and Megan Fox in a triple threat match. A week later, she won the Interim PWWA Championship by defeating Jessie McKay in the finals.

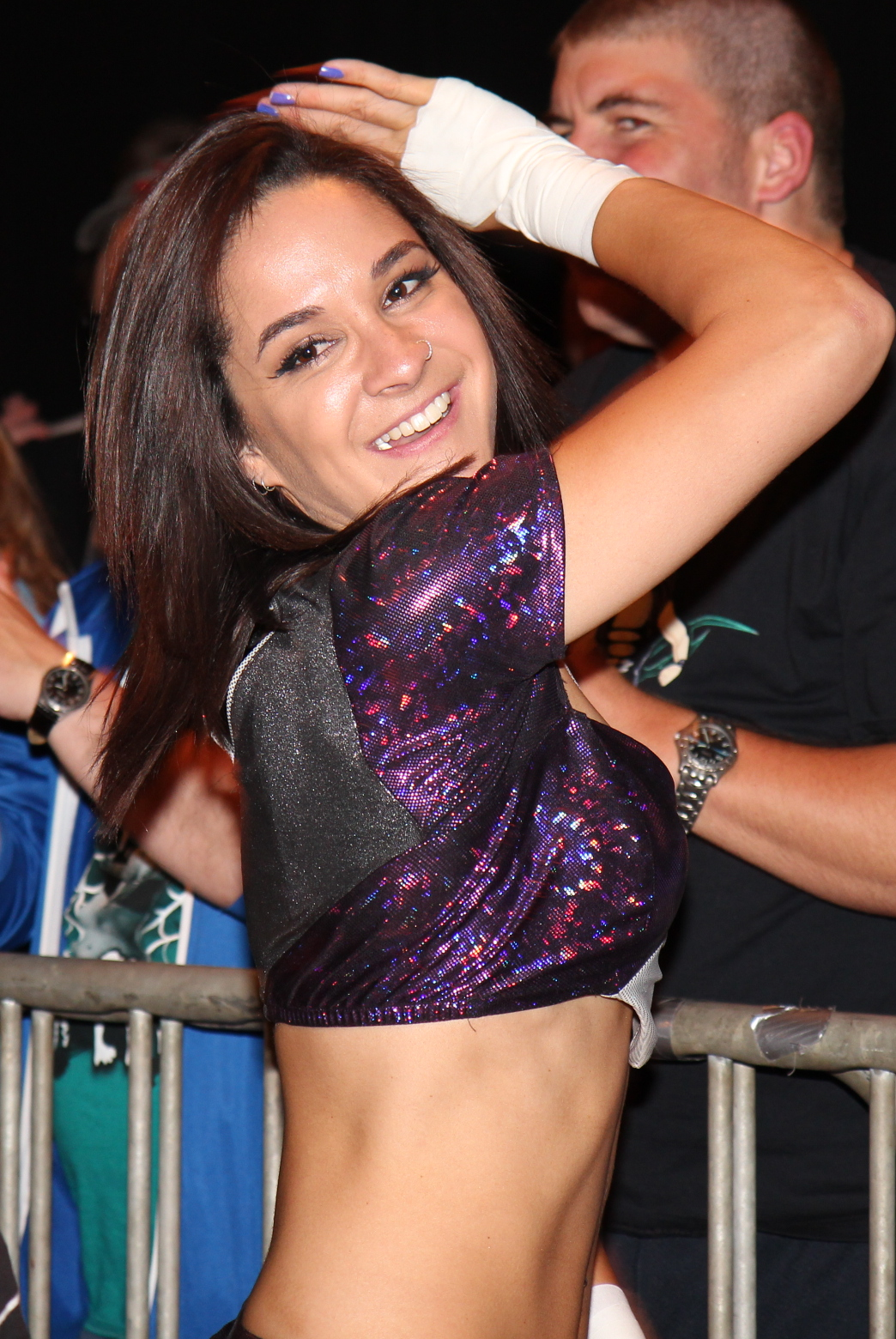
Evie wrestling for Shimmer Women Athletes in 2013

After Impact Pro Wrestling returned after a few months from folding in mid-2013, all the previous title holders were stripped of their championships. Evie made her debut for the all-female American promotion Shimmer Women Athletes at Volume 53 on 6 April 2013, participating in a five-way match which she lost to Christina Von Eerie and also included Yuu Yamagata, Kalamity, and Rhia O'Reilly. At Volume 54, Evie defeated Kimber Lee to pick up her first win for the promotion, but she was defeated by Mia Yim the next day at Volume 56. On 19 April 2013, Evie made her debut for Shine Wrestling at Shine 9, in a losing effort against Mercedes Martinez. Evie won the IPW New Zealand Women's Championship back in December 2013 and aligned herself with a new heel faction called 'The Investment'.

Evie began 2014 in Japan, working on a three-month contract awarded to her through Pro Wrestling Zero1, and becoming the first female to receive such a contract. She competed in a losing effort against Hikaru Shida at Shimmer Volume 62 in April 2014. At Volumes 63 and 64, Evie defeated Rhia O'Reilly and Nicole Matthews, respectively. At the Shine 18 iPPV on 20 April 2014, Evie and Skater lost to defending champions the Lucha Sisters (Leva Bates and Mia Yim) for the Shine Tag Team Championship.

=== World Wonder Ring Stardom (2015–2016) ===
On 6 December 2015, Evie made her debut for the Japanese World Wonder Ring Stardom promotion, winning the vacant Artist of Stardom Championship alongside Hiroyo Matsumoto and Kellie Skater. They lost the title to Io Shirai, Kairi Hojo, and Mayu Iwatani in their third defense on 28 February 2016.

=== WWE ===
==== Early appearances (2015–2017) ====
Crowley appeared on 14 October 2015 episode of NXT as Evie, losing to the debuting Nia Jax. On 15 December 2016, Crowley signed a contract with WWE, and in June 2017, she was announced as a participant in the upcoming Mae Young Classic under the new ring name Dakota Kai. According to Crowley, she wanted her new ring name to sound tomboyish but still reflect her Samoan heritage. The word Kai means sea in the Polynesian language, indicating her journey to get to WWE, and contrary to popular belief, is not a reference to Leilani Kai. Kai entered the tournament on 13 July, defeating Kavita Devi in the first round and Rhea Ripley in the second round, but was eliminated in the quarterfinals by Kairi Sane.

==== Beginnings in NXT (2017–2020) ====
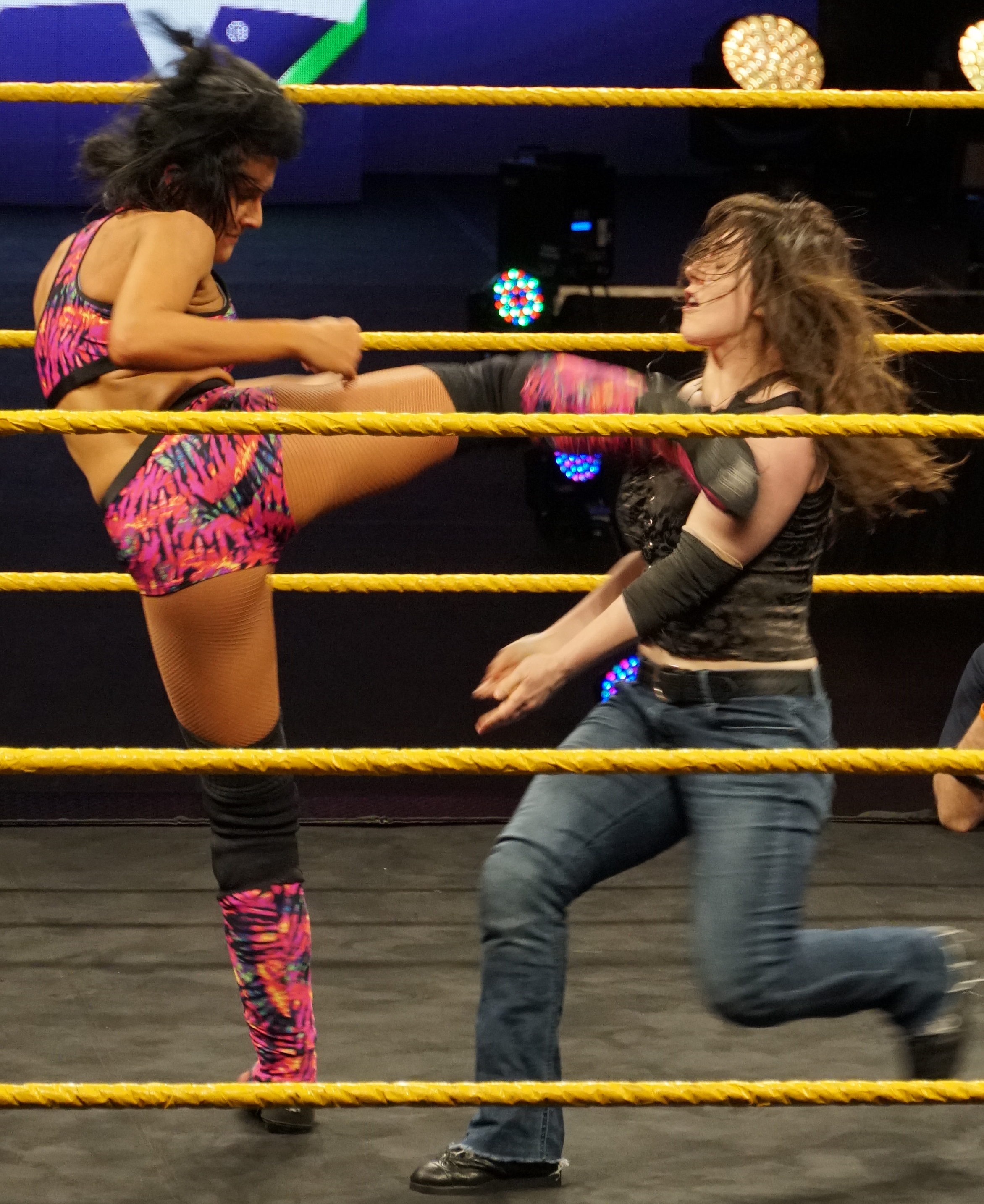
Kai (left) during her match with Nikki Cross in 2018

On 25 October 2017 episode of NXT, Kai returned to television, competing in a women's battle royal won by Nikki Cross. On 10 January 2018 episode of NXT, Kai lost to the debuting Shayna Baszler by referee stoppage after Baszler stomped and injured her arm. After the match, Baszler attacked and locked her in the Kirifuda Clutch until NXT Women's Champion Ember Moon saved her. On 14 March episode of NXT, Kai scored her first televised victory, defeating Lacey Evans. Kai made her WrestleMania debut at WrestleMania 34 on 8 April, competing in the WrestleMania Women's Battle Royal and becoming the first female New Zealander to compete at WrestleMania. Kai also won a WrestleMania Axxess tournament for an NXT Women's Championship match, but was defeated by newly crowned champion Baszler. In May, Kai earned another shot at the title, but again failed to win. Throughout the rest of the year, Kai racked up victories and losses against competitors like Santana Garrett, Bianca Belair, Lacey Evans and Aliyah.

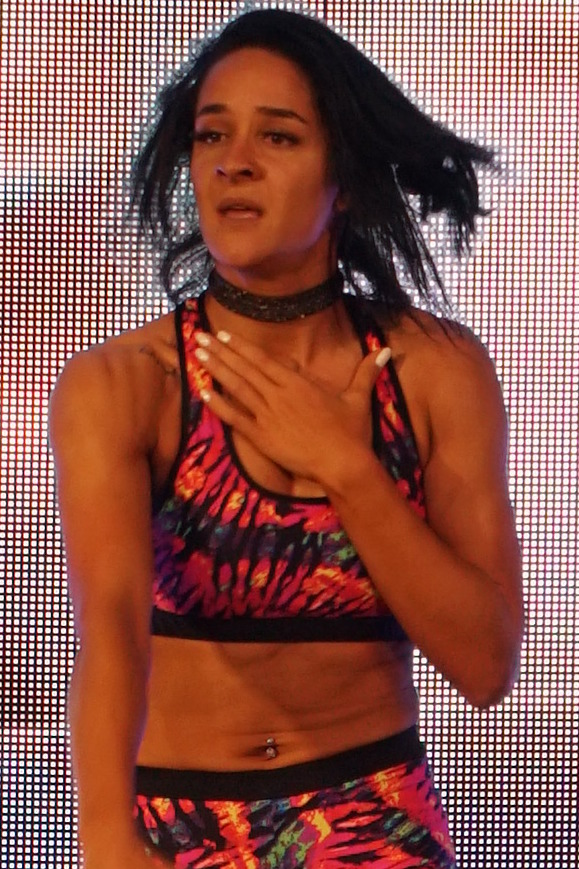
Kai in 2018

In parallel to her activities in NXT, Kai also appeared in the newly created NXT UK brand. At Evolution on 28 October, the first all women's pay-per-view, Kai unsuccessfully challenged Rhea Ripley (in a dark match) for the NXT UK Women's Championship. Before the match, Kai took part in a tournament (which was taped in the summer but aired in November) for the vacant championship, defeating Nina Samuels in the first round but was eliminated in the semi-finals by eventual winner Ripley. At NXT TakeOver: WarGames on 17 November, Kai and Io Shirai helped Kairi Sane during her match with Shayna Baszler by attacking Baszler's allies Jessamyn Duke and Marina Shafir. On 17 January 2019, Kai announced on her Twitter page that she sustained a torn ACL, during an NXT live event in December, which would sideline her from in-ring competition for the next few months. Kai defeated Taynara Conti in her return match on 25 September episode of NXT.

Shortly after, Kai's long-time tag team partner Tegan Nox returned to NXT and the two reunited their tag team dubbed "Team Kick". On 30 October episode of NXT, Team Kick unsuccessfully challenged The Kabuki Warriors (Asuka and Kairi Sane) for the WWE Women's Tag Team Championship. In November, Kai made her main roster debut as part of the NXT talent that were placed in an invasion angle with Raw and SmackDown as part of the Survivor Series pay-per-view. Mia Yim was chosen over Kai as part of Rhea Ripley's team for the first-ever women's WarGames match against Shayna Baszler's team. On 23 November, at NXT TakeOver: WarGames, just before the match took place, Kai replaced Yim, who was attacked backstage. However, before she entered the ring, Kai attacked her tag team partner Nox, turning heel. Upon her return in December, Yim revealed that Kai attacked her backstage, leading to a grudge match between the two, which Kai won. On 26 January 2020, at Royal Rumble, Kai entered her first Royal Rumble match at #15, but was eliminated by Chelsea Green.

==== Storyline with Raquel González (2020–2022) ====
On 29 January episode of NXT, Kai lost to Nox after she used a knee brace following a distraction from Candice LeRae. She then defeated Nox twice: in a street fight on 16 February at NXT TakeOver: Portland, and in a steel cage match, both after interference from González. At TakeOver: In Your House on 7 June, Kai, González and LeRae lost to Nox, Yim and Shotzi Blackheart in a six-woman tag team match. At NXT TakeOver XXX on 22 August, Kai failed to win the NXT Women's Championship from Io Shirai. On 6 December, she and González aligned with LeRae and Toni Storm to defeat Blackheart, Ember Moon, Shirai and Ripley in a WarGames match. Kai and González participated in the inaugural Women's Dusty Rhodes Tag Team Classic and won by defeating Blackheart and Moon in the finals at Vengeance Day on 14 February. With this win, they earned a shot at WWE Women's Tag Team Champions Nia Jax and Shayna Baszler, a match that would end in controversy on 3 March episode of NXT, after Kai was submitted by Baszler despite not being the legal competitor in the match. The following week, they were awarded the newly created NXT Women's Tag Team Championship by General Manager William Regal, marking Kai's first championship in WWE. However, the two lost the titles to Blackheart and Moon later that night.

After González won the NXT Women's Championship at NXT TakeOver: Stand & Deliver, tension began to show between the two as González began displaying more face tactics. On 27 July episode of NXT, Kai turned on González, ending their alliance. At NXT TakeOver 36 on 22 August, Kai unsuccessfully challenged González for the title. On 26 October, at Halloween Havoc, she returned as the mysterious person to cost González the title to Mandy Rose in a Trick or Street Fight. At WarGames on 5 December, Kai and Toxic Attraction (Gigi Dolin, Jacy Jayne, and Rose) lost to González, Shirai, Cora Jade, and Kay Lee Ray in a WarGames match. Kai then competed in the Women's Dusty Rhodes Tag Team Classic with Wendy Choo, defeating Indi Hartwell and Persia Pirotta in the first round, González and Jade in the semifinals on 8 March at Roadblock, but lost to Shirai and Kay Lee Ray in the finals.

On 29 March episode of NXT, after Toxic Attraction took out Choo, Kai attacked the group and was assisted by a returning Raquel González, whom Kai embraced afterwards, turning face. At the NXT Stand & Deliver pre-show on 2 April, Kai and González defeated Toxic Attraction members Dolin and Jayne to win the NXT Women's Tag Team Championship. However, they dropped the titles back to Toxic Attraction on the following episode of NXT after interference from Rose. The following week, Kai failed to win the NXT Women's Championship from Rose in what would be her final appearance in NXT.

On 29 April 2022, Kai was released from her WWE contract, ending her seven-year tenure with the company. She had reportedly expressed to the company that she was not planning on renewing her contract prior to her release.

==== Damage CTRL (2022–2025) ====
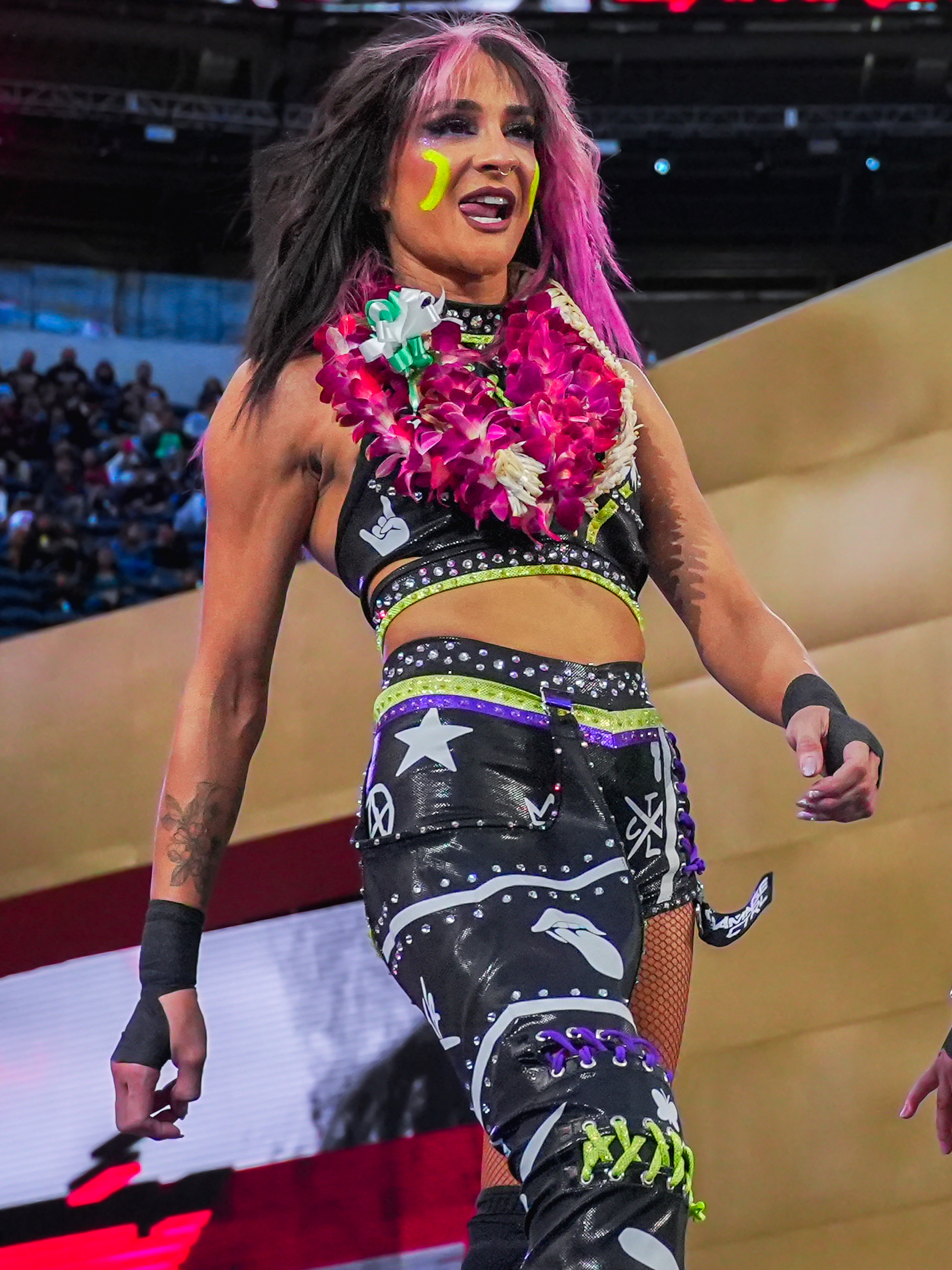
Kai making her entrance at Wrestlemania 39 in 2023

On 30 July 2022, Kai re-signed with WWE and returned at SummerSlam alongside Bayley and Iyo Sky (formerly known as Io Shirai), confronting Raw Women's Champion Bianca Belair. She officially joined the Raw brand as a heel and made her debut for the brand the following night. On 8 August episode of Raw, the trio challenged Belair, Alexa Bliss and Asuka to a six-woman tag team match at Clash at the Castle. Kai and Sky then participated in a tournament for the vacant WWE Women's Tag Team Championship and made it to the finals, where they lost to Aliyah and Raquel Rodriguez, albeit controversially as Aliyah pinned Kai even though she was not the legal competitor. On 3 September, at Clash at the Castle, the stable of Kai, Sky and Bayley was named as Damage CTRL, defeating Belair's team. On 12 September episode of Raw, Kai and Sky defeated Aliyah and Rodriguez in a rematch to win the Women's Tag Team Championship for the first time. With the win, Kai and Sky became two of three (the other being Rodriguez) wrestlers to have won the WWE and NXT Women's Tag Team Championships. Kai and Sky lost the titles on 31 October episode of Raw to Bliss and Asuka, ending their reign at 48 days. At Crown Jewel on 5 November, they won back the titles in a rematch, marking the first time a women's championship changed hands in the Middle East. At Survivor Series WarGames on 26 November, Damage CTRL, Rhea Ripley and Nikki Cross lost to Belair, Asuka, Bliss, Mia Yim and Becky Lynch, who pinned Kai, in a WarGames match. On 16 December episode of SmackDown, Kai and Sky retained their titles against Liv Morgan and Tegan Nox.

On 28 January 2023, Kai entered the women's Royal Rumble match at the titular event. She eliminated five wrestlers before being eliminated by Lynch. On 27 February episode of Raw, Kai and Sky lost the Women's Tag Team Championship to Lynch and Lita after interference from Trish Stratus, ending their second reign at 114 days. The feud resulted in a six-woman tag team match at WrestleMania 39 on 1 April, where Damage CTRL lost to Lynch, Lita, and Stratus.

As part of the 2023 WWE Draft, Damage CTRL was drafted to the SmackDown brand. On 12 May episode of SmackDown, Kai and Bayley failed to win the Women's Tag Team Championship from Liv Morgan and Raquel Rodriguez. During the match, both Kai and Morgan suffered injuries, with Kai tearing her ACL and Morgan injuring her shoulder. On 5 August, Kai made a physical appearance for the first time since her injury at SummerSlam to celebrate Sky's WWE Women's Championship victory. She began to appear regularly in a manager role for Damage CTRL until she was medically cleared for in-ring competition. On 9 February episode of SmackDown, Kai saved Bayley from an attack by Damage CTRL and was briefly kicked out of the stable. On 1 March episode of SmackDown, Kai and Bayley were set in a match against The Kabuki Warriors (whom had subsequently joined Damage CTRL), however, Kai attacked Bayley and rejoined the stable. At Night 1 of WrestleMania XL on 6 April, Kai, Asuka and Sane lost to Belair, Naomi and Jade Cargill in a six-woman tag team match.

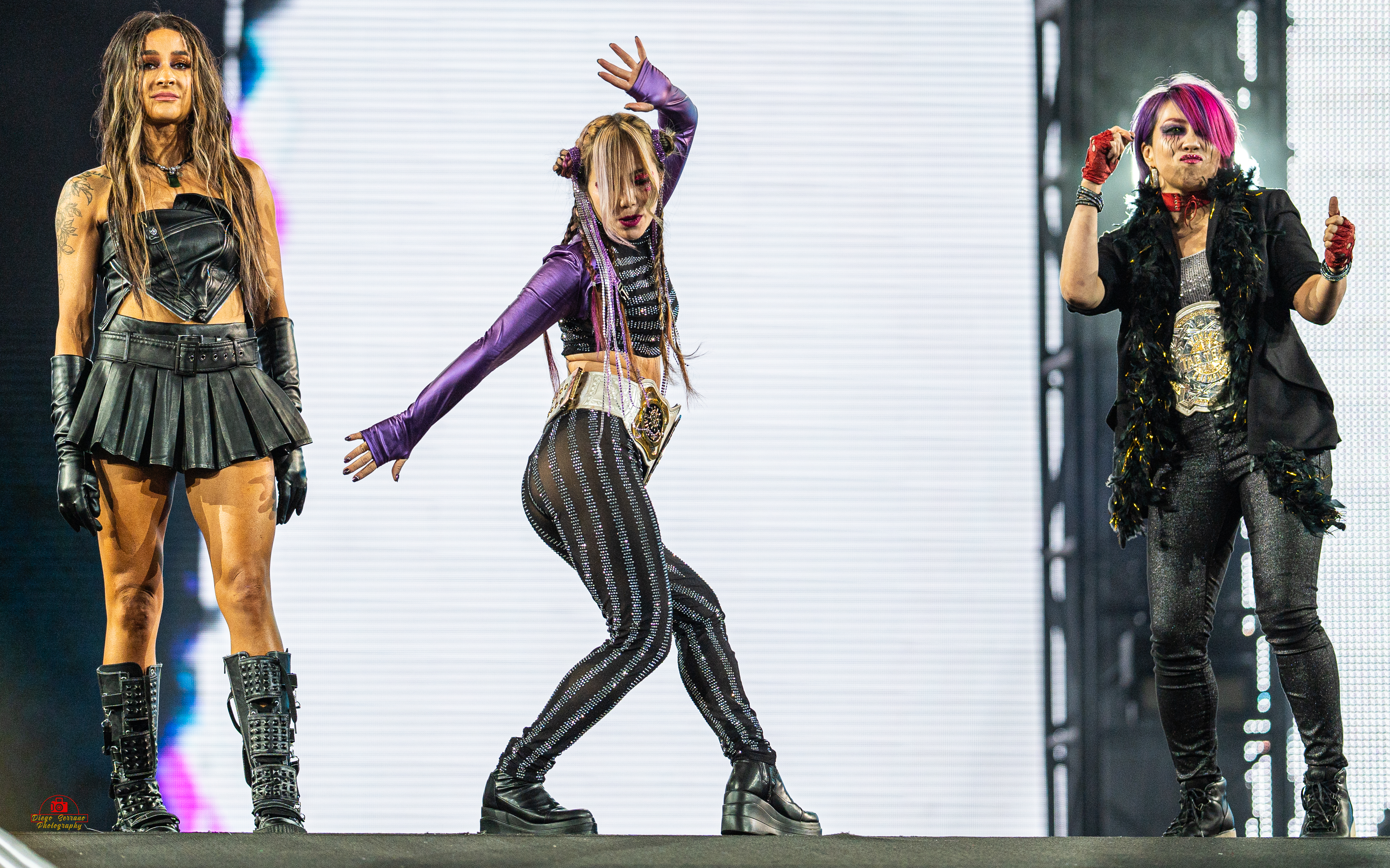
Damage CTRL make their entrance at WrestleMania XL in 2024

As part of the 2024 WWE Draft on 29 April, Kai was drafted to the Raw brand with the rest of Damage CTRL. On 6 May episode of Raw, Kai competed in the first round of the Queen of the Ring tournament, replacing Asuka, who was not medically cleared to compete, but lost to Lyra Valkyria. The group turned face on 29 July episode of Raw, when they began feuding with Pure Fusion Collective (Shayna Baszler, Zoey Stark and Sonya Deville). In August, it was reported that Kai had to undergo surgery after suffering another knee injury, this time a torn meniscus. A backstage attack on Kai by PFC was used to write her off television. Kai returned on the November 11 episode of Raw, where Damage CTRL defeated PFC in a six-woman tag team match. In late 2024, Kai entered the tournament to crown the inaugural Women's Intercontinental Champion, challenging Lyra Valkyria in the finals on the 13 January 2025 episode of Raw, which she lost. On 27 January, it was reported that Kai had suffered another injury, this time a concussion. On the 27 March episode of Main Event, Kai defeated Ivy Nile in what would be her final match in WWE. On 2 May, Kai was once again released from her WWE contract, ending her second tenure of three years with the company.

=== Return to independent circuit (2026–present) ===
On 8 March 2026, Crowley, wrestling under the ring name Charlie, made her first post-WWE appearance at Pro-Wrestling: EVE's event Wrestle Queendom VIII, where she unsuccessfully challenged Kris Statlander for the Pro-Wrestling: EVE International Championship. On 16 April 2026, at Culture Clash 2026, Charlie made her House of Glory (HOG) debut and unsuccessfully challenged Shotzi Blackheart for the HOG Women's Championship.

== Other media ==
In September 2009, Crowley starred in the music video for "Sweet December" by Auckland band These Four Walls. In the summer of 2013, as Evie, she was profiled on the Māori Television sports show Code.

Crowley streams on Twitch under the username "Charliegirl". In August 2023, Crowley, along with American professional wrestler Thea Trinidad (best known as Zelina Vega) launched a new podcast titled "ZELVXandCharlieGirl".

=== Video games ===
Dakota Kai in video games
| Year | Title | Notes | Ref. |
|---|---|---|---|
| 2018 | WWE 2K19 | Included in the "Rising Stars" Pack as DLC | |
| 2019 | WWE 2K20 | | |
| 2022 | WWE 2K22 | | |
| 2023 | WWE 2K23 | | |
| 2024 | WWE 2K24 | | |
| 2025 | WWE 2K25 | | |

== Personal life ==
Crowley is of Irish and Samoan descent. Her mother is originally from the Samoan village of Lepea on the island of Upolu. She has two younger siblings: a sister named Nyrene, a mixed martial artist, and a brother named Earl, who first introduced her to professional wrestling. Her grandfather Pat Crowley represented New Zealand in rugby as a member of the All Blacks in 1949 and 1950.

Crowley is close friends with American professional wrestlers Shayna Baszler, Jessamyn Duke, and Mia Yim and shares a house with Baszler in Florida. Crowley is engaged to American professional wrestler Karl Fredericks.

== Championships and accomplishments ==
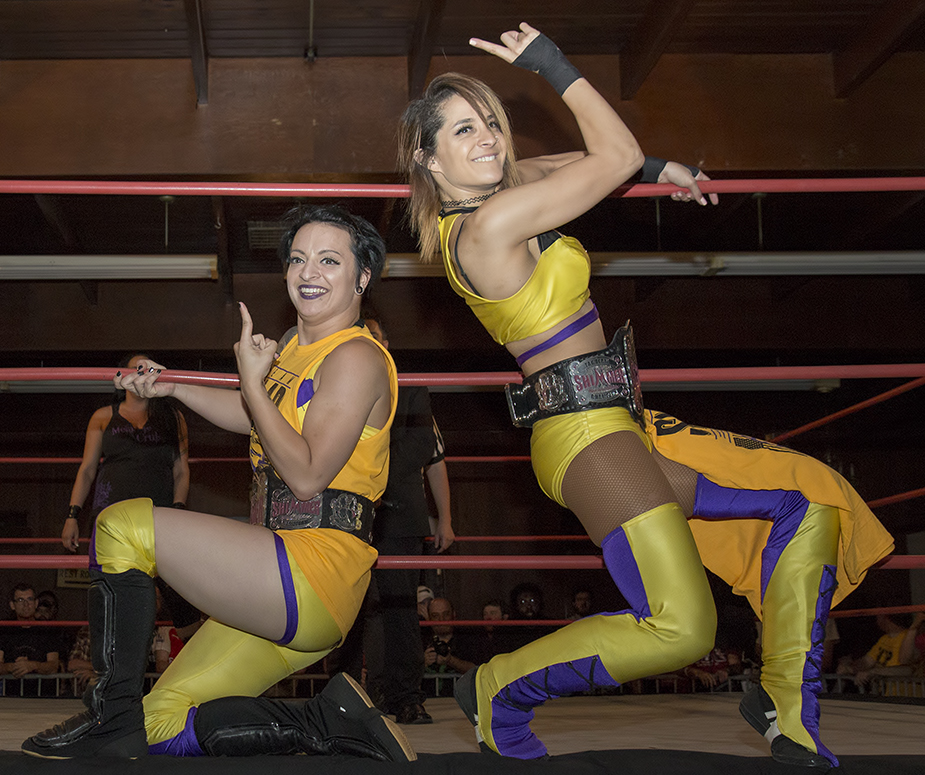
Alongside Heidi Lovelace, Evie was one half of the Shimmer Tag Team Champions in 2016. The duo was known as "Team Slap Happy".

- Pro Wrestling Women's Alliance
  - PWWA Championship (1 time)
  - PWWA Interim Championship (1 time)
  - PWWA Interim Championship Tournament (2012)
- Impact Pro Wrestling
  - IPW Women's Championship (3 times)
- Pro Wrestling Illustrated
  - Ranked No. 21 of the top 50 female wrestlers in the PWI Female 50 in 2016
- Shimmer Women Athletes
  - Shimmer Tag Team Championship (1 time) – with Heidi Lovelace
- World Wonder Ring Stardom
  - Artist of Stardom Championship (1 time) – with Hiroyo Matsumoto and Kellie Skater
- WWE
  - WWE Women's Tag Team Championship (2 times) – with Iyo Sky
  - NXT Women's Tag Team Championship (2 times, inaugural) – with Raquel González
  - NXT Women's Championship Invitational (2018)
  - Women's Dusty Rhodes Tag Team Classic (2021) – with Raquel González
  - NXT Year-End Award (1 time)
    - Future Star of NXT (2019)
