= Tegan Nox =

Welsh professional wrestler

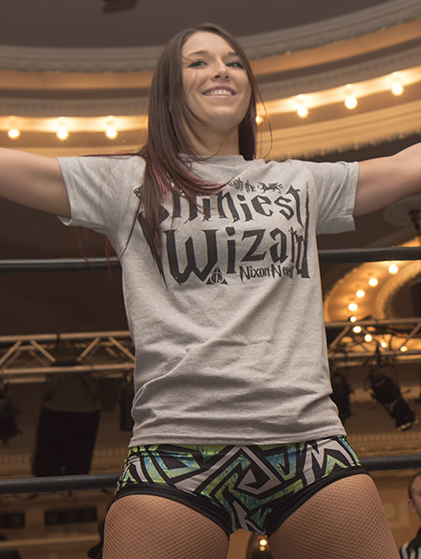
- Newell in November 2016

Personal information
- Born: Steffanie Newell; 15 November 1994 (age 31) Bargoed, Wales

Professional wrestling career
- Ring name(s): Luchadora the Explorer; Nixon Newell; Steffanie Newell; Tegan Nox
- Billed height: 5 ft 7 in (1.70 m)
- Billed from: Welsh Valleys
- Trained by: Dave Stewart; Wild Boar; WWE Performance Center
- Debut: 2013

Steffanie Newell (born 15 November 1994) is a Welsh professional wrestler. She makes appearances on the independent circuit under the ring name Nixon Newell. She is best known for her time in WWE, where she performed under the ring name Tegan Nox. She has also appeared for promotions such as All Elite Wrestling, Attack! Pro Wrestling, and Progress Wrestling.

== Early life ==
Steffanie Newell was born in Bargoed on 15 November 1994. Despite playing football for the majority of her youth, she grew up as a fan of professional wrestling after being introduced to it at the age of five, and has cited Molly Holly as her favourite female wrestler and dream opponent. As a youth, she played football for a number of teams in her area. At one point, she took part in trials for both Cardiff City FC and the Welsh women's national football team. She also played netball and tag rugby. At age 13, she suffered a knee injury which would ultimately cost her a place on the Welsh Under-16 team. When she finally turned 16, she gave up football and planned to take a long hiatus from all sports, citing her knee injury and a lack of passion for the sport. Shortly after, she found a professional wrestling school in Port Talbot and began training under Dave Stewart and Wild Boar. She has said that the encouragement of her late grandfather become a professional wrestler was her main inspiration.

== Professional wrestling career ==
=== Early career (2013–2017) ===
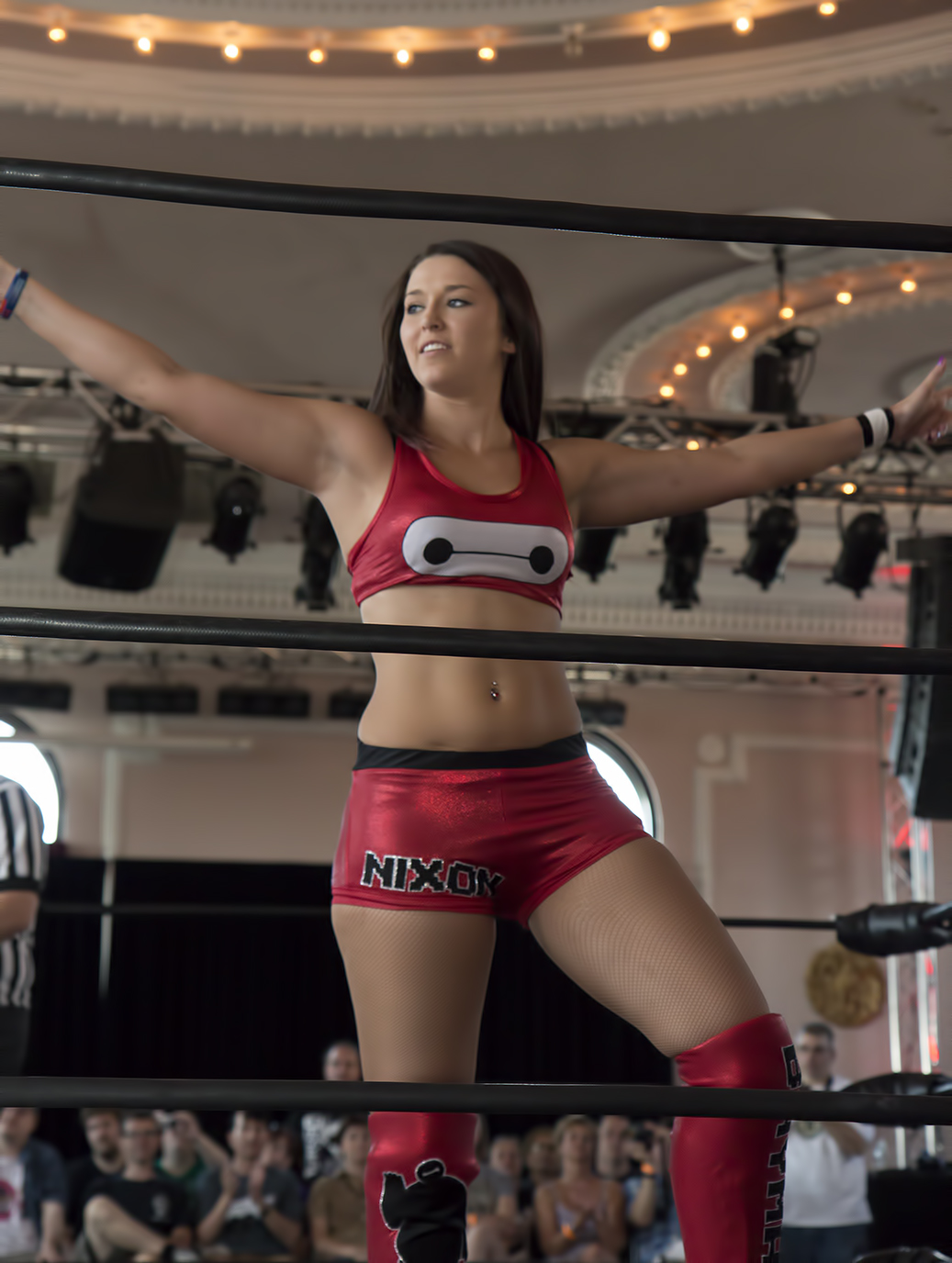
Newell performing for Shimmer Women Athletes in 2016

Newell made a one-time appearance with Total Nonstop Action Wrestling at its pay-per-view event Slammiversary XI as a fan under her real name. She won an all expenses paid trip via Challenge TV. Newell was interviewed by SoCal Val.

Newell debuted for Attack! Pro Wrestling in July 2014, competing three times on the same show. Firstly, she defeated Lana Austin and later in the evening teamed with Austin to defeat Mark Andrews and Pete Dunne to win the Attack! 24/7 Championship for the second time in her career. Later that night, Newell and Austin lost the championship to Mike Bird in a handicap match. She debuted her Luchadora the Explorer character on 24 January 2015, teaming with Brookes in a loss to The Anti-Fun Police (Damian Dunne and Ryan Smile). She competed as Luchadora once again on 14 February, winning a special invitational scramble match. In January 2016, Newell aligned herself with Mark Andrews, forming the extremely popular team known as Bayside High. In their first match as a team, Newell and Andrews defeated #CCK (Chris Brookes and Kid Lykos). Two days later on 3 April, Bayside High became the new Attack: Pro! Tag Team Champions, defeating #CCK. The duo retained the titles until August, when they lost them back to #CCK in a TLC match. In late-2016, Newell turned into a villainess, abandoning Bayside High and aligning herself with Pete Dunne. In their first match together, Dunne and Newell (dressed as the Suicide Squad iterations of The Joker and Harley Quinn, respectively) defeated Martin Kirby and El Ligero (dressed as Kevin Owens and El Generico, respectively).

Newell debuted for the American all-female promotion Shimmer Women Athletes at Volume 81 in June 2016, first losing to Veda Scott and then losing to Nicole Matthews the following day at Volume 82. At Volume 84, Newell picked up her first win in Shimmer, defeating Scott.

Newell debuted for Progress Wrestling on 28 August 2016, defeating Alex Windsor. On 27 November, she entered the Natural Progression Series IV Tournament (a single elimination tournament to crown the first ever Progress Women's Champion), defeating Katey Harvey in the first round.

In January 2017, Newell embarked on her first tour of Japan, competing with the all-female promotion World Wonder Ring Stardom. In her first match on the tour, she and Kay Lee Ray defeated Oedo Tai (Kris Wolf and Viper). On 29 January, Newell challenged Kairi Hojo for the Wonder of Stardom Championship, losing after a diving elbow from Hojo.

=== WWE (2017–2021, 2022–2024) ===
==== NXT (2017–2021) ====
In April 2017, it was reported that Newell had signed a contract with WWE. It was reported that Newell was replaced in the WWE Mae Young Classic, because of suffering a torn anterior cruciate ligament before the tournament had even begun.

Newell returned to the ring on 13 April 2018, at an NXT live event, where she teamed up with Dakota Kai in a tag team match to defeat Reina González and Vanessa Borne. After being announced as a competitor in the 2018 Mae Young Classic, Newell entered the tournament on 8 August, under the ring name "Tegan Nox", defeating Zatara. Nox returned the following day, defeating Nicole Matthews in the second round before suffering another knee injury in her quarter-final match against Rhea Ripley. After the match premiered on the WWE Network, Nox posted on Twitter that she had suffered numerous injuries during the match, including: a torn ACL, medial collateral ligament, lateral collateral ligament, meniscus, and patellar dislocation.

On 25 June 2019, Nox made her in-ring return at an NXT live event in Orlando, Florida. On 11 September, Nox made her NXT UK debut when she defeated Shax. Afterwards, Nox began a feud with NXT UK Women's Champion Kay Lee Ray, resulting in a non-title match between the two on 3 October episode of NXT UK, where Nox was unsuccessful. On 16 October, Nox returned to NXT, defeating Taynara. Thereafter, Nox began teaming with long-time friend Dakota Kai, with the two defeating Jessamyn Duke and Marina Shafir to become number one contenders to the WWE Women's Tag Team Championship on 23 October episode of NXT. Nox and Kai would go on to lose their title match against The Kabuki Warriors (Asuka and Kairi Sane) on 30 October episode of NXT. Two days later on SmackDown, Nox and Ripley were one of the many NXT wrestlers to invade the show, challenging Mandy Rose and Sonya Deville to a tag-team match, which Nox and Ripley emerged victorious. Later that night, Nox joined Triple H and the rest of the NXT roster as they declared war on both Raw and SmackDown, and vowed to win the Survivor Series brand warfare. Nox was chosen by Ripley to join her team as part of a women's WarGames match at NXT TakeOver: WarGames. At the event on 23 November, just before the match took place, Mia Yim was attacked backstage and unable to compete in the women's WarGames match, before her teammate Dakota Kai replaced Yim on Team Ripley. Ripley's team defeated Shayna Baszler's team, however Nox would not take part in the match after Kai turned on Team Ripley and attacked her. Nox had a title match for the NXT Women's Championship on 15 July episode of NXT, but was defeated by Io Shirai. On 30 September, WWE announced that Nox had once again suffered a torn ACL and would be out of action for an indefinite amount of time.

After a near ten-month absence, Nox returned on 6 July 2021 at The Great American Bash, causing LeRae and Indi Hartwell to lose the NXT Women's Tag Team Championship.

==== Main roster (2021, 2022–2024) ====
On the 9 July 2021 episode of SmackDown, Nox made her main roster debut, teaming with Shotzi Blackheart to defeat the WWE Women's Tag Team Champions, Natalya and Tamina in a non-title match. The two would then go on to defeat Natalya and Tamina in numerous tag team matches, but would never receive a championship match. As part of the 2021 Draft, Nox was drafted to the Raw brand while Shotzi remained on the SmackDown brand, thus ending the team. On 18 November, she was released from her WWE contract without ever appearing on Raw.

After a year, Nox returned to WWE on 2 December 2022 episode of SmackDown, rescuing Liv Morgan from an attack by Damage CTRL (Bayley, Dakota Kai and Iyo Sky). On 16 December episode of SmackDown, Nox and Morgan lost to Damage CTRL for the Women's Tag Team Championship. As part of the 2023 WWE Draft, Nox was drafted to the Raw brand. On 25 September episode of Raw, Nox picked up a victory over Natalya to receive a NXT Women's Championship match against Becky Lynch. Two weeks later on Raw, Nox unsuccessfully challenged Lynch for the title. In the weeks to follow, Nox would form an alliance with Natalya. This alliance would result in Nox defeating both Women's Tag Team Champions Chelsea Green and Piper Niven in singles matches. On 20 November episode of Raw, Nox and Natalya won a fatal 4-way tag team match to receive a Women's Tag Team Championship opportunity. The following week on Raw, Nox and Natalya would challenge for the titles in a losing effort. On 27 January 2024 at the 2024 Royal Rumble, Nox entered in her third women's Royal Rumble match at number 12, eliminating Natalya before being eliminated by Bayley. During the 2024 WWE Draft, Nox was drafted back to the SmackDown brand. On 1 November, Nox was released from WWE for a second time.

=== Independent circuit (2024–present) ===
On 6 November 2024, it was announced that Newell would make her return to Attack! Pro Wrestling on 14 and 15 December, but her appearance was cancelled. She made her official independent return for Attack! Pro Wrestling on 1 March for their 'Press Start 8' event.

=== All Elite Wrestling (2025) ===
Newell, alongside Miranda Alize, made her All Elite Wrestling (AEW) debut, during the 25 October 2025 episode of Collision, interrupting TayJay (Anna Jay and Tay Melo) during their backstage interview. Their in-ring debut took place on 1 November edition of the show, where they were defeated by Megan Bayne and Marina Shafir in a match lasting under three minutes.

On 8 November, it was reported by Mike Johnson of PWInsider that Newell and Alize refused to perform in a scheduled match on that day's taping of Collision and walked out. According to the report, the duo were booked to lose to TayJay, but Newell and Alize allegedly objected to the booking, stating they did not want to take another loss after losing their debut match the prior week and left the venue an hour before the match was scheduled to start. On a livestream on 9 November, Newell and Alize denied that they refused to lose to TayJay, stated that their issue was that the match was only going to be three minutes, and that AEW had allowed them to leave the venue. Both Newell and Alize received backlash from other wrestlers and independent promoters.

== Professional wrestling style and persona ==
Newell has stated her former ring name "Tegan Nox" is a tribute to both her Welsh heritage and being a fan of the Harry Potter franchise. This also relates to her nickname: "The Girl with the Shiniest Wizard" – as she uses a step-up knee strike, commonly referred to as a shining wizard, as her finishing move. She has dubbed herself NXT's resident "Lady Kane"; a moniker that she gave herself in honor of her favorite WWE Superstar, Kane, as well as adopting his chokeslam finisher.

== Other media ==
Newell (as Tegan Nox) is a playable character in WWE 2K22, WWE 2K24, and WWE 2K25.

== Personal life ==
Newell is bisexual and has cited Captain Marvel as her inspiration for coming out. She is in a relationship with American fellow wrestler Miranda Alize, with whom she performs in a tag team named "Violent Romance".

== Championships and accomplishments ==
- Pro Wrestling Illustrated
  - Ranked No. 26 of the top 100 female wrestlers in the PWI Women's 100 in 2020
