= Lei Ying Lee =

Chinese professional wrestler and mixed martial artist (born 1988)

Xia Li
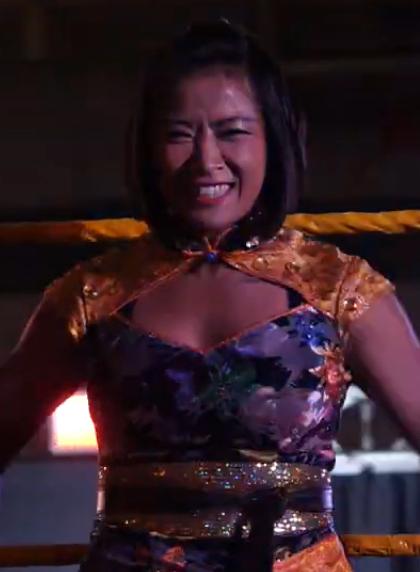
- Li in November 2019

Personal information
- Born: Xia Zhao; 28 July 1988 (age 38) Chongqing, Sichuan, China

Professional wrestling career
- Ring name(s): Léi Yǐng Lee; Xia Li; Xia Zhao
- Billed height: 5 ft 4 in (1.63 m)
- Billed from: Chongqing, China
- Trained by: WWE Performance Center
- Debut: July 13, 2017

Xia Zhao (simplified Chinese: 赵霞; traditional Chinese: 趙霞; pinyin: Zhào Xià; born July 28, 1988) is a Chinese professional wrestler and mixed martial artist known as Léi Yǐng Lee. She is known for her work with Total Nonstop Action Wrestling (TNA), where she is a former two-time TNA Knockouts World Champion. Zhao also worked for WWE, as Xia Li.

== Professional wrestling career ==
=== WWE (2017–2024, 2025) ===
==== Mae Young Classic (2017–2018) ====
In January 2017, Li joined the WWE Performance Center after she had impressed talent scouts at a tryout in Shanghai, China. On July 13, she made her debut for WWE competing in the inaugural Mae Young Classic, making her the first Chinese woman to ever compete in a WWE ring. She was eliminated in the first round by Mercedes Martinez. On September 19, 2018, Li competed in her second Mae Young Classic, defeating Karen Q in the first round, but was eliminated in the second round by Deonna Purrazzo. Throughout 2017 and 2018, Li only wrestled at NXT live events outside of the Mae Young Classic.

==== Beginnings in NXT (2019−2020) ====
On January 27, 2019, at the Royal Rumble, Li made her first appearance on a main roster pay-per-view by entering the women's Royal Rumble match at number 11, but was eliminated by Charlotte Flair. She made her television debut on the February 20 episode of NXT, losing in a singles match to Mia Yim. On the May 1 episode of NXT, she picked up her first televised win by defeating Rachel Evers. In mid-November, Li got into a feud with Aliyah and Vanessa Borne, getting singles victories over the duo on the November 13 and 27 episodes of NXT respectively, the latter of which saw her get attacked by NXT Women's Champion Shayna Baszler, Marina Shafir and Jessamyn Duke afterwards. It led to a non-title match the following week, with Li losing to Baszler by submission.

Li would compete in the women's Royal Rumble match again at the namesake event on January 26, 2020, entering at number 24, but was eliminated by Shayna Baszler. Li fought with Mia Yim again on the February 26 episode of NXT, this time winning the match with a roll-up after a distraction from Dakota Kai and Raquel González. On the March 25 episode of NXT, Li was set to face Aliyah in a qualifier to compete in a Ladder match to determine the number one contender for the NXT Women's Championship, but was injured by her backstage before the match started. This led to a brief match between the two on the April 15 episode of NXT, with Li getting revenge by defeating Aliyah. On the May 6 episode of NXT, Li had a match with Chelsea Green, which she lost due to a distraction from Aliyah. This led to another match between the two on the June 17 episode of NXT, with Aliyah getting the victory after Robert Stone distracted Li by vomiting in the ring.

==== Tian Sha (2020−2021) ====
On the September 16 episode of NXT, Li teamed up with Jessi Kamea in a losing effort against Kayden Carter and Kacy Catanzaro, with Li refusing to shake hands with them after the match. The following week, she competed in a battle royal to determine the number one contender for the NXT Women's Championship, which was won by Candice LeRae. Li went against Carter on the September 30 episode of NXT, losing the match and pushing her to the mat after being extended a hand. The following week, after losing a match against Shotzi Blackheart, she was approached by Boa who gave her a letter and followed him afterwards. On the October 21 episode of NXT, Li lost a match against Catanzaro. After the match, she attacked her and Carter, thus turning heel.

On the November 25 episode of NXT, a vignette aired of Li and fellow NXT superstar Boa, both haggard in appearance, entering the backseat of a vehicle together before being driven to an unknown location. The same elderly man who handed Boa a letter on the November 11 episode of NXT appeared outside of the building, appearing to be waiting for them. Weekly vignettes began airing of both Li and Boa being brutally "punished for their failures", all while being watched over by the elderly man and a mysterious woman in black-and-white face paint. A transformed Li returned on January 6, 2021 during NXT's New Year's Evil special, squashing Katrina Cortez in dominant fashion. The following week, she defeated another jobber in two strikes, but then was wordlessly given an order by her master on the stage, resulting in Li tying up the opponent and taking more shots at her. On the February 10 episode of NXT, Li defeated Cora Jade in quick fashion. During and after the match, Kacy Catanzaro and Kayden Carter came out to the ring to reason with her but she attacked them both for disrespecting her master Mei Ying. Li went on to defeat both Catanzaro and Carter in singles bouts on the February 24 and March 10 episodes of NXT respectively, and beat them again in a handicap match three weeks later.

In June, Li began a feud with Mercedes Martinez over losing to her in the inaugural Mae Young Classic, defeating her in a match at NXT TakeOver: In Your House. On the June 29 episode of NXT, she teamed with Boa to defeat Martinez and Jake Atlas in a mixed tag team match. On the July 20 episode of NXT, Li challenged Raquel González for the NXT Women's Championship but failed to win. During the match, she suffered an injury following a springboard senton splash however, she appeared to be okay afterwards.

==== SmackDown (2021–2023) ====
As part of the 2021 Draft, Li was drafted to the SmackDown brand. Despite making her debut as a face, she turned heel in a segment on the April 22 episode of SmackDown. On June, Li began to work on the Raw brand.

Li also teamed with Shotzi to participate in the WWE Women's Tag Team Championship Tournament for the vacant tag titles, but were eliminated by Raquel Rodriguez and Aliyah. She spent her time participating in several matches for title chances for the WWE Women's Tag Team Championship, the SmackDown Women's Championship, but didn't win any of them.

At Royal Rumble on January 28, 2023, Li entered at number 14, but was eliminated by Zelina Vega. On the March 24 episode of SmackDown, Li teamed with Lacey Evans and fought Natalya and Shotzi to determine who will qualify for the Women's fatal four-way tag team match at WrestleMania 39, but failed to win.

==== Final storylines (2023–2024) ====
As part of the 2023 WWE Draft, Li was drafted to the Raw brand. On the June 8 episode of Main Event, Li lost to Candice LeRae. On the October 9 episode of Raw, Li would confront NXT Women's Champion Becky Lynch, asking for a title shot. On the October 30 episode of Raw, Li defeated LeRae in a brief match and would once again confront the now former champion Lynch, who would tell her they could fight right now, but Li responded they will fight on her time. The following week, while Lynch was making her entrance for a battle royal to determine the number one contender for Rhea Ripley's Women's World Championship at Survivor Series: WarGames, Li would attack her, resulting in Lynch not being able to compete. Raw General Manager Adam Pearce would take Li out of the match as punishment. On the November 7 episode of NXT, Li made her return to the brand to confront new NXT Women's Champion Lyra Valkyria, telling her if she had seen what Li had done to former champion Lynch the night prior, and went onto claim that she was coming for Valkyria's title. A security guard would attempt to get in between Li and Valkyria, to which the former would take him out with a roundhouse kick.

On the November 13 episode of Raw, after defeating Indi Hartwell via knockout, Li was interrupted by Becky Lynch who was not waiting to fight on Li's time, but rather her time, before getting into the ring and attempted to "Man Handle Slam" Li. She escaped Lynch's attempt and rushed out of the ring. That same night, NXT's official Twitter account posted a video of Lyra Valkyria receiving a virtual invitation to a "Warriors Tea Ceremony" hosted by Li. On the following episode of NXT, the tea ceremony would take place, with Li explaining that the ceremony was important because it is how her ancestors honored their rival before combat. Li would go on to compare the tea leaves crumbling in the heat to what would happen to Valkyria next week in their title match. Li would then command Valkyria to consume the tea, to which she respectfully declined. After declining, Li warned Valkyria that if she didn't consume the tea, Li would show no remorse in battle. Before leaving, they both bowed in respect for one another. On the November 20 episode of Raw, Li got her match against Lynch, but Li lost. On the following night's episode of NXT, Li competed against Valkyria for the NXT Women's Championship in a losing effort.

At Royal Rumble, on January 27, 2024, Li entered at number 16, but was eliminated by Nia Jax. On the February 19 episode of Raw, Li competed in a Last Chance battle royal to earn the final spot in the women's Elimination Chamber match at Elimination Chamber: Perth, being eliminated by eventual winner Raquel Rodriguez.

On April 19, 2024, Li revealed via Twitter that she had left WWE, with news revealing she had been released shortly after, ending her 7-year tenure with the WWE.

==== Return to WWE (2025) ====
On the September 23 episode of NXT, Lee, along with other wrestlers of the TNA roster, took part in a major storyline, where they invaded NXT and brawled with various wrestlers on the NXT roster. On October 7 (which aired on tape delay on October 14), Lee competed in a battle royal to determine the number one contender to Jacy Jayne's NXT Women's Championship at Halloween Havoc, being eliminated by Kali Armstrong. On November 18 (which aired on tape delay on November 25) at NXT: Gold Rush Week 2, Lee defeated Kelani Jordan and Jordynne Grace to win the TNA Knockouts World Championship by pinning Jordan, making it the first title in Lee's career.

=== Independent circuit (2024–present) ===
On June 10, 2024, it was revealed that Xia would be competing at West Coast Pro Wrestling's Queen of Indies event on August 17. Despite initially being billed as Xia Lee, she performed at the event with the name Xia Zhao. At the event, Xia teamed up with Aja Kong and Viva Van to win a six-woman tag team match against Amira, Karisma and Lady Apache. On August 18, Xia wrestled at Kitsune Women's Wrestling's "Yabai!" show against Nagisa Nozaki to a double count out. A week later, it was announced that Xia would make her Tokyo Joshi Pro-Wrestling (TJPW) debut at Wrestle Princess V on September 22. At the event, she teamed with Mizuki and defeated Yuki Kamifuku and Veny. On December 29 at TJPW Year-End Party 2024, Lee lost to Kamifuku for both her SPW Queen of Asia and VPW Women's Championships. At Tokyo Joshi Pro '25 on January 4, 2025, Lee teamed with Kamifuku to defeat Wakana Uehara and Rika Tatsumi. In December 2025, Lee was announced to appear at TJPW's Grand Princess event on March 29, 2026, teaming up with Sareee to face Miyu Yamashita and Arisu Endo, but TNA pulled Lee from the event, cancelling the match.

=== Total Nonstop Action Wrestling (2024–2026) ===
==== The Angel Warriors (2024–2025) ====
In September, Total Nonstop Action Wrestling aired vignettes on Impact! showing Zhao under the name Léi Yǐng Lee. She made her debut on September 26, defeating Hyan, and signed a contract with TNA.

On the October 31 episode of Impact!, after defeating Maggie Moore, Lee was attacked by a returning Savannah Evans. On November 24, Lee debuted for Game Changer Wrestling (GCW) at Josh Barnett's Bloodsport XII, losing to Masha Slamovich via referee stoppage for the TNA Knockouts World Championship. On the January 9, 2025 episode of Impact!, Lee returned and defeated Evans. Lee defeated Rosemary on the February 20 episode of Impact!, but was blinded by green mist afterwards. On March 14 at Sacrifice, Lee fought Tessa Blanchard in a losing effort. On June 6 at Against All Odds, Lee failed to win the TNA Knockouts World Championship against Slamovich.

On August 15 at Emergence, Lee re-signed with the company, and teamed with Xia Brookside in a four-way tag team match for the TNA Knockouts World Tag Team Championship, which was won by The Elegance Brand (Heather by Elegance and M by Elegance). The following month, Lee and Brookside began teaming as The Angel Warriors. On the September 25 episode of Impact!, Lee competed in the Call Your Shot Gauntlet Battle Royal Qualifier, eliminating Ryan Nemeth but was eliminated by eventual winner Mance Warner, getting the number one spot in the titular match at Bound for Glory. The following night at Victory Road, Lee won a battle royal along with NXT wrestler Kelani Jordan to compete for the vacant TNA Knockouts World Championship later in the night, where she lost to Jordan. On October 12 at Bound for Glory, Lee was eliminated from the Call Your Shot Gauntlet by A. J. Francis.

==== Knockouts World Champion (2025–2026) ====
On November 18 (which aired on tape delay on November 25) at NXT: Gold Rush Week 2, Lee defeated Kelani Jordan and Jordynne Grace to win the TNA Knockouts World Championship by pinning Jordan, making it the first title in Lee's career. On December 5 at Final Resolution, Lee successfully defended the TNA Knockouts World Championship against her Angel Warriors tag team partner Xia Brookside. On January 17, 2026, at Genesis, Lee defeated NXT's Zaria to retain her title.

On February 13 at No Surrender, Lee dropped the title to NXT's Arianna Grace, ending her reign at 87 days. On March 27 at Sacrifice, Lee failed to regain the title from Grace in a three-way match, which also involved Dani Luna who was pinned. On April 11 at Rebellion, Lee got another shot against Grace for the title, but lost after being betrayed by Brookside. She would defeat Grace in a rematch on the April 15 tapings of Impact!, which aired on tape delay on May 7, to become a two-time champion. On June 28 at Slammiversary, Lee lost the title to Xia Brookside, ending her second reign at 74 days. On the July 9 episode of Impact!, Lee fought Brookside in a No Disqualification match, but failed to recapture the title. On November 12, 2026, she was released from TNA and became a free agent.

== Mixed martial arts career ==
=== Combat Night (2024–present) ===
On July 18, 2024, it was announced that Zhao would be making her MMA debut against Xiomara Lee for Combat Night MMA. However, the fight was postponed as Zhao has tested positive for COVID-19. On April 25, 2025, it was announced that Zhao would face Myriam Essalki on May 17. She won against Essalki via split decision in her Combat Night debut that was billed as an amateur Muay Thai match.

== Other media ==
Li made her video game debut in ‘‘The Whole Dam Pack’’ DLC for WWE 2K22. She also appears in WWE 2K23 and WWE 2K24.

== Personal life ==
Before joining WWE, Li was a lifelong combat-sports athlete, competing in the martial art of wushu. She was the co-founder of her own fitness studio and achieved multiple first place finishes in various martial arts and fitness competitions including: the second World Traditional Chinese Wushu Championship, Nike Challenge Competition and first China Throw Down: Battle on the Bund.

== Championships and accomplishments ==
- Pro Wrestling Illustrated
  - Ranked No. 111 of the top 250 female wrestlers in the PWI Women's 250 in 2025
- Total Nonstop Action Wrestling
  - TNA Knockouts World Championship (2 times)
