= Zeda Zhang =

Puerto Rican professional wrestler (born 1987)

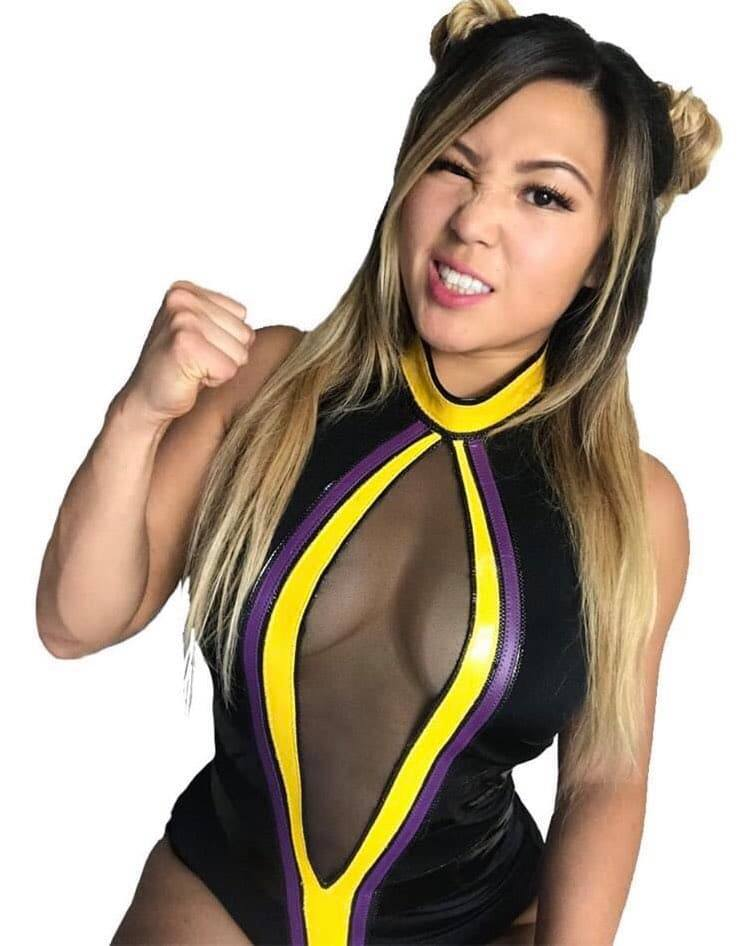

Personal information
- Born: Julia Ho; July 1, 1987 (age 39) Richmond, Virginia, U.S.

Professional wrestling career
- Ring name(s): Julia Ho; Zeda; Zeda Zhang
- Billed height: 5 ft 3 in (160 cm)
- Billed weight: 128 lb (58 kg)
- Billed from: Richmond, Virginia
- Trained by: Brian Kendrick; WWE Performance Center; Sara Amato; Team Vision Dojo; Chasyn Rance
- Debut: May 13, 2017

Julia Ho (born July 1, 1987) is an American professional wrestler and former mixed martial artist, better known by her ring name Zeda Zhang. In the past she was signed with WWE NXT and Major League Wrestling (MLW), where she was the first female wrestler signed to the promotion.

She previously was signed to WWE, where she appeared on the NXT brand under the ring name Zeda. She competed in the first Mae Young Classic in 2017 during her time with WWE.

== Mixed martial arts career ==
Ho made her amateur mixed martial arts (MMA) debut on July 2, 2011, defeating Betty Huck via unanimous decision. Ho fought her second and final MMA fight on October 27, 2012, defeating Evie Johnson in the second round via submission by rear naked choke.

== Professional wrestling career ==
=== WWE (2017–2018) ===
Ho made her debut for WWE on the NXT brand on May 13, 2017, as part of a battle royal at a house show in Dade City, Florida, wrestling under her real name.

In July, Ho competed in the first Mae Young Classic under the ring name Zeda. She lost in the first round of the tournament to eventual runner-up Shayna Baszler.

She wrestled on house shows and occasionally on the brand's television program, WWE NXT, until her release on June 2, 2018.

=== Oriental Wrestling Entertainment (2018–2019) ===
After she was released from WWE, Zeda began working with Oriental Wrestling Entertainment, where she began training with Cima.

=== Major League Wrestling (2019) ===
On October 2, 2019, it was announced that Ho had signed a multi-year deal with Major League Wrestling (MLW) under the ring name Zeda Zhang, becoming the promotion's first member of their new women's division. Zeda Zhang would make her MLW debut defeating The Spider Lady, who would later be revealed as Priscilla Kelly, by DQ on MLW Fusion 85.

=== All Elite Wrestling (2021–2022) ===
On August 10, 2021, Zeda Zhang made her All Elite Wrestling (AEW) debut against Thunder Rosa on AEW Dark in a losing effort.

On March 6, 2022, she wrestled for AEW again, this time against Toni Storm on AEW Dark in a losing effort.
