= Mae Young Classic (2017) =

WWE Network event and tournament

- Official logo
- Promotion: WWE
- Date: July 13–14, 2017 (aired August 28 and September 4); September 12, 2017 (final)
- City: Winter Park, Florida; Paradise, Nevada (final)
- Venue: Full Sail University; Thomas & Mack Center (final)

WWE event chronology
← Previous; SummerSlam	Next → No Mercy

Mae Young Classic chronology
← Previous; First	Next → 2018

The 2017 Mae Young Classic was a multi-night special event and tournament promoted by the American professional wrestling promotion, WWE. It was constituted by a 32-competitor tournament for women from WWE's developmental brand, NXT, and wrestlers from the independent circuit. The majority of the tournament took place at Full Sail University in Winter Park, Florida and was taped from July 13–14, 2017; these matches aired on the WWE Network on August 28 (round 1) and September 4 (round 2, quarterfinals, and semifinals). The tournament final match aired live on the WWE Network on September 12 and took place at the Thomas & Mack Center in Paradise, Nevada. The event was named in honor of Mae Young. The winner of the inaugural tournament was Kairi Sane.

The 2017 Mae Young Classic also featured WWE's first full-time female referee, Jessika Carr. A second edition of the tournament was held in the summer and fall of 2018.

== Background ==
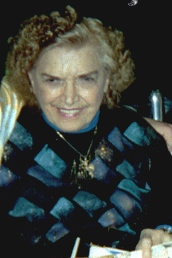
Mae Young – WWE Hall of Famer and the tournament's namesake

At a press conference during the weekend of WrestleMania 33, the American professional wrestling promotion WWE announced that a women's tournament would be taking place in the summer of 2017, with a total of 32 wrestlers competing. It was also announced that the tournament would be among wrestlers from WWE's developmental brand, NXT, and wrestlers from the independent circuit. The event was named in honor of WWE Hall of Famer Mae Young, who is considered a pioneer of women's wrestling. The first four wrestlers announced to be competing were Sarah Logan, Lacey Evans, Princesa Sugehit, and Toni Storm, with the rest revealed in the weeks leading up to the event. On June 26, Hall of Famers Lita and Jim Ross were announced as the commentators for the tournament.

On July 13, WWE held the Mae Young Classic: Parade of Champions, a pre-tournament event streamed live on YouTube and Facebook and revealed the remaining tournament participants. The Mae Young Classic also featured WWE's first full-time female referee, Jessika Carr. Round 1 up through the semifinals of the tournament were taped at Full Sail University in Winter Park, Florida on July 13 and 14 and aired on the WWE Network on August 28 (round 1) and September 4 (round 2, quarterfinals, and semifinals). The tournament final match aired live on September 12 from the Thomas & Mack Center in Paradise, Nevada, and was also streamed on the WWE Network.

== Qualifying matches ==
The tournament consisted of various matches that resulted from scripted storylines and had predetermined results.

NXT tapings – June 23 (Full Sail University – Winter Park, Florida)

No.	Results	Stipulations
1	Bianca Belair defeated Aliyah	Mae Young Classic Qualifying Match
2	Vanessa Borne defeated Jayme Hachey	Mae Young Classic Qualifying Match

== Participants ==
Wrestler	Country representing	Ref
Abbey Laith	United States	
Ayesha Raymond	England	
Bianca Belair	United States	
Candice LeRae	United States	
Dakota Kai	New Zealand	
Jazzy Gabert	Germany	
Kairi Sane	Japan	
Kavita Devi	India	
Kay Lee Ray	Scotland	
Lacey Evans	United States	
Marti Belle	Dominican Republic	
Mercedes Martinez	United States	
Mia Yim	South Korea	
Miranda Salinas (Note: This competitor is a replacement for another participant who was taken out of the tournament.)	United States	
Nicole Savoy	United States	
Piper Niven	Scotland	
Princesa Sugehit	Mexico	
Rachel Evers	United States	
Reina González	United States	
Renee Michelle	United States	
Rhea Ripley	Australia	
Sage Beckett	United States	
Santana Garrett	United States	
Sarah Logan	United States	
Serena Deeb	United States	
Shayna Baszler	United States	
Taynara Conti	Brazil	
Tessa Blanchard	United States	
Toni Storm	Australia	
Vanessa Borne	United States	
Xia Li	China	
Zeda	China	

=== Replaced ===
This participant was taken out of the tournament for a specific reason and therefore was replaced by another competitor.

Wrestler	Country representing	Progression in the tournament	Reason	Replacing wrestler	Ref
Nixon Newell	Wales	Replaced before the official start of the tournament	ACL injury	(United States) Miranda Salinas	

=== Alternates ===
If any of the official participants had suffered an injury, they would have been replaced by one of the following wrestlers:

Wrestler	Country representing
Barbi Hayden	United States
Deonna Purrazzo	United States
Jessica James	United States
Lei'D Tapa	Tonga
Nicole Matthews	Canada

== Broadcast team ==
Ring name	Real name	Notes
Alundra Blayze	Debrah Miceli	Backstage interviewer Hall of Famer
Dasha Fuentes	Dasha Kuret	Ring announcer
Jim Ross	James Ross	Lead commentator Hall of Famer
Lita	Amy Dumas	Color commentator Hall of Famer
Lilian Garcia	Lilian Garcia	Ring announcer (finals)

== Referees ==
Ring name	Real name	Notes
Eddie Orengo	Eddie Orengo	
Jessika Carr	Jessika Heiser	
Danilo Anfibio	Danilo Anfibio	
Darryl Sharma	Darryl Sharma	
D.A. Brewer	Antoine Brewer	

== Tournament bracket ==
The following time limits were in place:

- Round one: 15 minutes
- Round two: 20 minutes
- Quarterfinals: 25 minutes
- Semifinals: 30 minutes
- Final: No time limit

1st Round; Mae Young Classic; July 13, 2017 (Aired: August 28)
(Germany) Jazzy Gabert	7:33
(United States) Abbey Laith	Pinfall
(United States) Rachel Evers	Pinfall
(Dominican Republic) Marti Belle	6:10
(Mexico) Princesa Sugehit	Submission
(Scotland) Kay Lee Ray	6:32
(China) Xia Li	3:07
(United States) Mercedes Martinez	Submission
(United States) Nicole Savoy	Submission
(United States) Reina González	4:27
(United States) Renee Michelle	5:36
(United States) Candice LeRae	Pinfall
(United States) Sarah Logan	7:17
(South Korea) Mia Yim	Pinfall
(China) Zeda	2:42
(United States) Shayna Baszler	Submission
(Japan) Kairi Sane	Pinfall
(United States) Tessa Blanchard	8:38
(United States) Sage Beckett	5:33
(United States) Bianca Belair	Pinfall
(New Zealand) Dakota Kai	Pinfall
(India) Kavita Devi	3:58
(Australia) Rhea Ripley	Pinfall
(United States) Miranda Salinas	3:51
(United States) Vanessa Borne	6:22
(United States) Serena Deeb	Pinfall
(United States) Santana Garrett	7:10
(Scotland) Piper Niven	Pinfall
(Brazil) Taynara Conti	4:41
(United States) Lacey Evans	Pinfall
(England) Ayesha Raymond	4:27
(Australia) Toni Storm	Pinfall

2nd Round; Mae Young Classic; July 14, 2017 (Aired: September 6)
(United States) Abbey Laith	Pinfall
(United States) Rachel Evers	4:49
(Mexico) Princesa Sugehit	5:14
(United States) Mercedes Martinez	Pinfall
(United States) Nicole Savoy	5:53
(United States) Candice LeRae	Pinfall
(South Korea) Mia Yim	5:39
(United States) Shayna Baszler	Submission
(Japan) Kairi Sane	Pinfall
(United States) Bianca Belair	10:00
(New Zealand) Dakota Kai	Pinfall
(Australia) Rhea Ripley	7:03
(United States) Serena Deeb	7:10
(Scotland) Piper Niven	Pinfall
(United States) Lacey Evans	5:07
(Australia) Toni Storm	Pinfall

Quarterfinals; Mae Young Classic; July 14, 2017 (Aired: September 6)
(United States) Abbey Laith	8:58
(United States) Mercedes Martinez	Pinfall
(United States) Candice LeRae	3:13
(United States) Shayna Baszler	Submission
(Japan) Kairi Sane	Pinfall
(New Zealand) Dakota Kai	7:42
(Scotland) Piper Niven	7:38
(Australia) Toni Storm	Pinfall

Semifinals; Mae Young Classic; July 14, 2017 (Aired: September 6)
(United States) Mercedes Martinez	8:11
(United States) Shayna Baszler	Submission
(Japan) Kairi Sane	Pinfall
(Australia) Toni Storm	12:23

Final; Mae Young Classic; September 12, 2017
(United States) Shayna Baszler	12:07
(Japan) Kairi Sane	Pinfall

== Aftermath ==
Performers on the tournament such as Bianca Belair, Dakota Kai, winner Kairi Sane, Lacey Evans, Reina González, Rhea Ripley, Sarah Logan, Taynara Conti, Vanessa Borne, Xia Li already had signed contracts with the company. Nixon Newell, who missed the tournament due to injury, also already signed a contract with the company.

On October 3, WWE officially announced that finalist Shayna Baszler had signed a contract with the company and started training at the WWE Performance Center. On October 15, 2017, WWE announced that performer Kavita Devi had signed a contract, and will start training at their Performance Center in January 2018.

On January 16, 2018, WWE announced that Candice LeRae had been signed to a contract, performing on the NXT brand.

On February 8, 2018, WWE announced that Serena Deeb had been signed by WWE to become a coach at the WWE Performance Center in Orlando, Florida.

On March 8, 2018, WWE officially announced that Abbey Laith and Sage Beckett were released from their NXT contracts.

In April 2018, a second Mae Young Classic tournament was scheduled for later that year.

On May 31, 2018, WWE announced that Deonna Purrazzo had been signed to a contract by WWE and will be performing in their developmental territory NXT.

On June 2, 2018, Zeda was released from her NXT contract.

Rhea Ripley, Rachel Evers, Xia Li, Mercedes Martinez, Taynara Conti, Kavita Devi, Reina González, Toni Storm, alternate Deonna Purrazzo, and Nixon Newell (under the ring name Tegan Nox) all competed in the 2018 Mae Young Classic tournament.

On January 12, 2019, Toni Storm defeated Rhea Ripley to win the NXT UK Women's Championship.

On February 27, 2019, WWE announced that Kay Lee Ray and Jazzy Gabert had been signed to a contract by WWE and will be performing in their NXT UK.

On March 27, 2019, WWE announced that Piper Niven had been signed to a contract by WWE and will be performing in their NXT UK.

On August 14, 2019, WWE announced that Santana Garrett had been signed to a contract by WWE and will be performing in their developmental territory NXT.

On September 5, 2024 Xia Li had been signed to a contract by TNA after Her released from her WWE

On April 24, 2026, Kairi and Alba Fyre are released from her WWE contract.

== See also ==
- Cruiserweight Classic
- Dusty Rhodes Tag Team Classic
