= Kavita Devi (wrestler) =

Indian professional wrestler (born 1986)

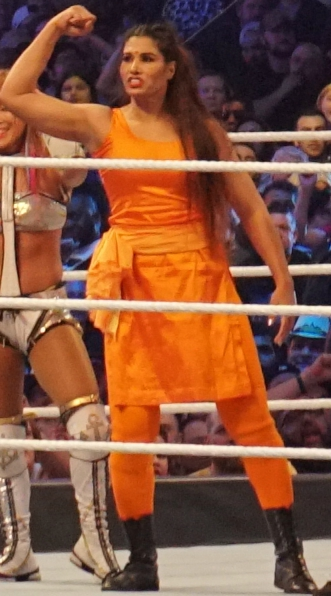
- Devi in the inaugural WrestleMania Women's Battle Royal (April 2018)

Personal information
- Born: Kavita Dalal; 20 September 1986 (age 40) Malvi, Jind District, Haryana, India

Professional wrestling career
- Ring name(s): Hard KD; Kavita; Kavita Devi
- Billed height: 5 ft 9 in (1.75 m)
- Billed from: Haryana, India
- Trained by: The Great Khali; WWE Performance Center; Sara Del Rey
- Debut: 2016

Kavita Dalal (born 20 September 1986) is an Indian professional wrestler who performed in the WWE, under the ring name Kavita Devi, on their developmental territory NXT between 2017 and 2021. Devi is the first female professional wrestler of Indian nationality to wrestle in WWE. Devi previously wrestled on the independent circuit under the ring names Kavita and Hard KD, most notably for Continental Wrestling Entertainment in India.

== Personal life ==
Kavita Devi Dalal, one of the five siblings, was born in Malvi village of Julana tehsil of Jind district of Haryana state of India. She got married in 2009 and gave birth to a child in 2010, after which she wanted to quit sports but inspired by her husband she continued playing.

== Weightlifting and powerlifting career ==
Kavita Dalal
Medal record
Women's Weightlifting
Representing India
South Asian Games
Gold medal – first place	2016 Guwahati and Shillong	Freestyle (– 75 kg)

Devi has represented India in international competition, she won gold in the 75 kg category at the 2016 South Asian Games.

=== Awards ===
- 12th South Asian Games
  - Gold in women's weightlifting 75 kg

== Professional wrestling career ==
On 24 February 2016, Kavita Dalal entered the promotion of The Great Khali named Continental Wrestling Entertainment, to begin her training as a professional wrestler. Devi made her debut for the promotion in June 2016, under the ring name Kavita, accepting the "Open Challenge" of B. B. Bull Bull before attacking her. On 25 June, she appeared with a new ring name, Hard KD, teaming with Sahil Sangwan in a losing effort against B. B. Bull Bull and Super Khalsa in the first mixed tag team match in promotion. Kavita cites her trainer The Great Khali as her main inspiration to become a professional wrestler.

On 13 July, she was announced as one of the participants for the Mae Young Classic tournament. On 28 August, Kavita was eliminated in the first round by Dakota Kai.

On 15 October 2017, WWE announced that Devi had signed a contract, and will start training at their Performance Center in January 2018. On 8 April 2018, Devi made her first appearance as part of the company while also making her WrestleMania debut at WrestleMania 34 competing during the inaugural WrestleMania Women's Battle Royal in which she was eliminated by Sarah Logan. On 19 April, Devi made her NXT Live event debut as a heel, teaming with Aliyah against Dakota Kai and Steffanie Newell in a losing effort. She participated in the Mae Young Classic 2018 but lost in the first round against a returning Kaitlyn. On 19 May 2021, it was announced that Devi was released from WWE.

== Business ventures ==
In January 2019, she started trials for selecting players to launch a WWE Super League in India.

== Electoral Performance ==
2024 Haryana Legislative Assembly election: Julana
Party	Candidate	Votes	%	±%
INC	Vinesh Phogat	65,080	46.86%	▲37.02
BJP	Yogesh Kumar	59,065	42.53%	▲12.66
INLD	Surender Lather	10,158	7.31%	New
JJP	Amarjeet Dhanda	2,477	1.78%	▼47.23
AAP	Kavita Rani	1,280	0.92%	▲0.16
NOTA	None of the Above	202	0.15%	New
Margin of victory		6,015	4.33%	▼14.81
Turnout		1,38,871	75.20%	▲2.42
Registered electors		1,85,565		▲6.35
INC gain from JJP		Swing	▼2.15	

== See also ==
- Sakshi Malik
- Phogat sisters
- Badshah Khan (wrestler)
