= WWE 2K19 =

2018 video game

- Cover art featuring AJ Styles
- Developer: Yuke's (Note: Additional work by Visual Concepts.)
- Publisher: 2K
- Series: WWE 2K
- Platforms: PlayStation 4 Windows; Xbox One
- Release: October 9, 2018 (Note: Deluxe Edition was released on October 5, four days prior to its full release.)
- Genre: Sports
- Modes: Single-player, multiplayer

WWE 2K19 is a 2018 professional wrestling video game developed by Yuke's and published by 2K. It was released worldwide on October 9, 2018, for Microsoft Windows, PlayStation 4, and Xbox One. It is the twentieth game in the WWE series, the sixth under the WWE 2K banner, and the successor to WWE 2K18.

This would be the final WWE game to be developed by Yuke's after eighteen years. The series would be developed exclusively by Visual Concepts from WWE 2K20 onwards, with Yuke's going on to develop AEW Fight Forever for All Elite Wrestling and publisher THQ Nordic.

== Gameplay ==
In an interview with Hardcore Gamer, WWE 2K creative director Lynell Jinks stated that WWE 2K19 would be moving away from the simulation-styled gameplay of the last four WWE games, in favor of faster, more fluid gameplay, saying "[The fans] kind of got turned off by the product we were giving them and we had to think outside the box and they never thought that we'd do it. The core was simulation, and people got turned off by that and we were hearing loud and clear that they weren't buying it anymore and that was the driving force behind all of that." He added "We were hearing from the fanbase that it was too slow, too sluggish and it wasn't any fun anymore."

=== Game modes ===
WWE 2K19 features many different returning and new game modes, including the 2K Showcase Mode, focusing on the career of Daniel Bryan. This is the first Showcase to be featured in the series since WWE 2K17's Hall of Fame Showcase DLC. Players take control of 11 different unique models of Daniel Bryan, in 11 matches, from his Velocity matchup against John Cena, under his real name, Bryan Danielson, to his WrestleMania 34 matchup with Shane McMahon against Kevin Owens and Sami Zayn, along with a twelfth and final match, a fictional match against his past self at the WrestleMania 34 arena.

Two new "Tower" modes are present in 2K19. In MyPlayer Towers mode, wrestlers or created superstars can participate in challenges online or offline. Daily, Weekly and Pay-Per-View challenge towers are also introduced. In WWE Towers, There are two types of Towers including the Gauntlet Tower, where players must complete the Tower entirely in one session, in a similar vein to a usual gauntlet match. Losing a match or quitting resets the progress to square one. In the Steps Tower, the players' progress is saved after each match, so they can play at their own pace.

MyCareer mode has been reinvented with the focus of a more linear storyline that centers the player's created character as an aspiring wrestler named Buzz, who rides on his Bug Busters van, working his way up from the independent wrestling promotion, BCW, to the WWE, with the story ending at Wrestlemania 34, with either Barron Blade or Cole Quinn on Buzz's side and Triple H as the special referee, winning the WWE Universal Championship from AJ Styles, with Finn Bálor on his side. Barron Blade, a fictional character featured in previous MyCareer modes, also returns and acts as Buzz's guide.

The Road to Glory mode returns from previous entries, with the ability to now join one of eight different factions.

=== Roster ===
The internal base roster to WWE 2K19 is 197 (204 via Pre-Order) and DLC carrying the number of superstars at 224. This number would be shattered in its sequel WWE 2K20 with the number of 276 (also the game with the most duplicates in WWE 2K game history)

== Release ==
On June 15, 2018, 2K announced WWE 2K19. On June 18, 2018, 2K held a press conference, with AJ Styles being announced as the official cover star for the video game; as well as the announcement of the "WWE 2K19 Million Dollar Challenge", in which players must beat the Million Dollar Tower (which is a Gauntlet Tower, where the goal is to beat 15 opponents as himself in a gauntlet match at the WrestleMania 34 arena under 6 different match types, Standard, Pin Only, Submission Only, Standard Steel Cage, Submission Only Steel Cage and Hell in a Cell, based on real matches from his career, as well as fictional matches, along with a gold variation of himself, with an overall rating of 100, inside Hell in a Cell with a 15 minute time limit at the end, with damage carrying over between matches, a 10 minute time limit on each match, besides the final match, and no escapes as the stipulation for the Standard Steel Cage match against Finn Bálor and the Submission Only Steel Cage match against Samoa Joe on Legend difficulty) in the new towers mode and submit a promotional video, after which four semifinalists will be selected. The semifinalists will compete in a tournament to determine who will face Styles for the million dollar prize right before NXT TakeOver: New York.

On June 25, 2018, Rey Mysterio was announced as one out of two pre-order bonus characters. On July 9, 2018, Ronda Rousey was confirmed as the second pre-order bonus character.

On July 25, 2018, 2K revealed the WWE 2K19 Collector's Edition that would be based on Ric Flair, titled the "Wooooo! Edition". Similar to some of the previous games; it includes a Deluxe Edition copy of the game and access to the game four days early and the Season Pass alongside other physical features, including a plaque featuring a fabric piece from Flair's pink or purple robe. In-game features include the access to pre-order bonus characters Ronda Rousey and Rey Mysterio; as well as a 2002 version of The Undertaker, Ricky Steamboat, Roddy Piper, Dusty Rhodes and Randy Savage, Flair's WrestleMania XXIV robe and his daughter, Charlotte Flair's WrestleMania 32 robe as in-game attires, and the 1983 Starrcade arena.

Over three weeks in August and September 2018, 2K streamed roster reveal videos on their YouTube and Twitch channels, hosted by Rusev and Lana with a different tag team as guests each week; The B-Team (Bo Dallas and Curtis Axel) the first week, Gallows and Anderson (Luke Gallows and Karl Anderson) the second week, The Bar (Cesaro and Sheamus) the third week. On September 13, 2018, 2K released the official gameplay trailer, showcasing several new features such as Big Head Mode, a zombie version of Triple H, and Bray Wyatt's House of Horrors match location. One week later, the soundtrack was revealed in a livestream hosted by The New Day (Xavier Woods, Big E and Kofi Kingston), alongside Elias and rapper Wale. Each song on the soundtrack was chosen by a WWE wrestler and includes popular artists such as Eminem, Post Malone, Metallica and Fall Out Boy.

== Reception ==
Reception

Aggregate score
Aggregator	Score
Metacritic	(PS4) 76/100 (XONE) 77/100

Review scores
Publication	Score
Destructoid	7/10
GameRevolution	3.5/5
GameSpot	7/10
GamesRadar+	4/5
IGN	7.3/10

WWE 2K19 received "generally favorable" reviews, according to review aggregator Metacritic.

The game was nominated for "Fan Favorite Sports/Racing Game" at the Gamers' Choice Awards, and for "Sports, Racing or Fighting Title of the Year" at the Australian Games Awards.

IGN rated 2K19 a 7.3 out of 10, saying, "It's still held back by a number of longstanding issues. But with the much improved MyCareer mode, and the sheer amount of content available thanks to the return of Showcase Mode and the addition of 2K Towers, it stops the downward spiral of the series and puts it back on track."

=== Extended support ===
After the failure of WWE 2K20, online support for WWE 2K19 was extended to March 2022, coinciding with the release of the next major game in the series, WWE 2K22, which was the first game in the series to be released on the PlayStation 5 and Xbox Series X alongside Steam, PlayStation 4 and Xbox One.

== See also ==
- List of licensed wrestling video games
- List of fighting games
- List of video games in the WWE 2K Games series
- WWE 2K
