= Danielle Kamela =

American professional wrestler

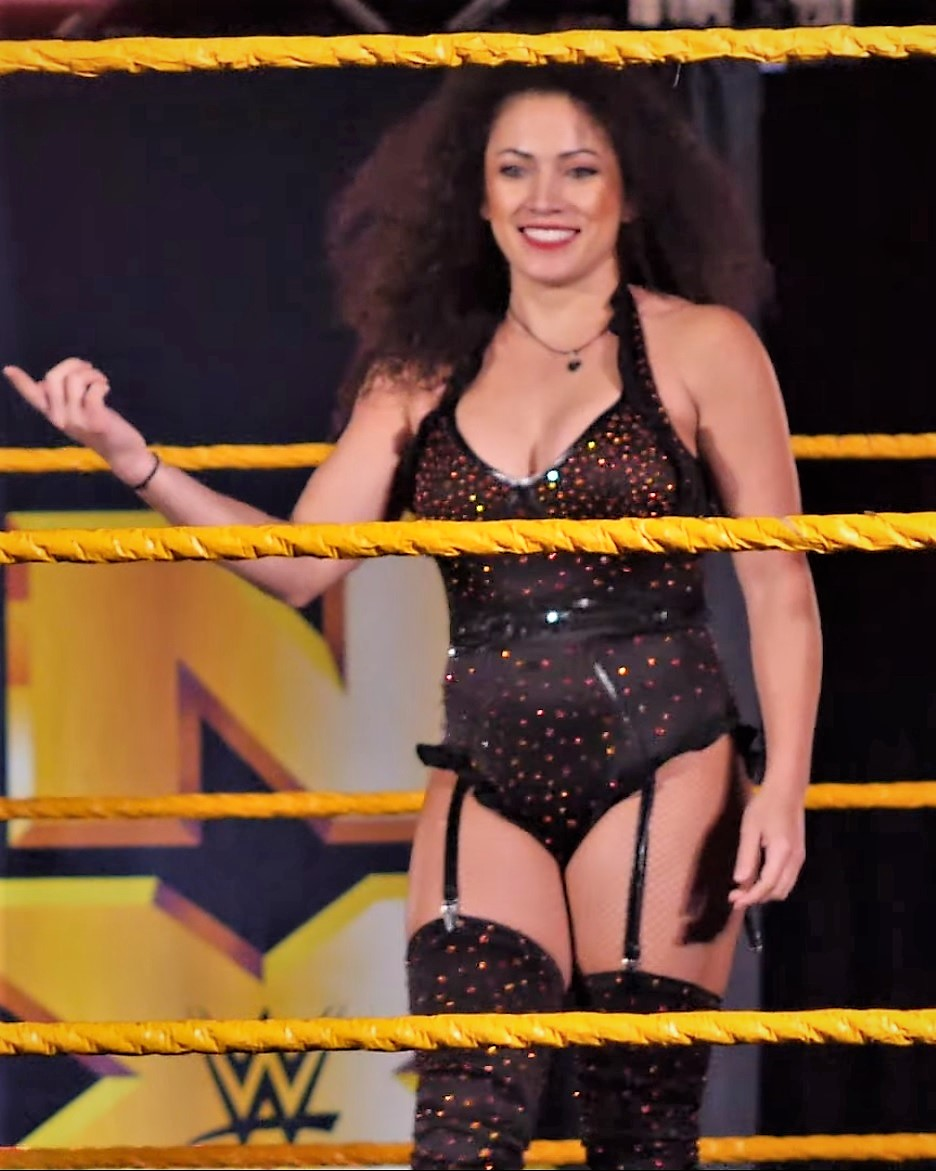
- Borne in 2019

Personal information
- Born: Danielle Sierra Kamela; March 18, 1988 (age 38) Scottsdale, Arizona, U.S.
- Education: Arizona State University
- Website: daniellekamela.com

Professional wrestling career
- Ring name(s): Danielle Kamela; Vanessa Borne
- Billed height: 5 ft 4 in (163 cm)
- Billed weight: 120 lb (54 kg)
- Billed from: Scottsdale, Arizona
- Trained by: Rikishi; Gangrel; WWE Performance Center
- Debut: December 30, 2015

Danielle Sierra Kamela (born March 18, 1988) is an American professional wrestler and actress. She previously worked for WWE under the name Vanessa Borne.

== Early life ==
Kamela was born in Scottsdale, Arizona and is of Samoan, Polish, Chinese, German, and Irish descent. A graduate of Chaparral High School and Arizona State University, Kamela worked as a Fox Sports Arizona presenter, Phoenix Suns dancer, and Arizona Cardinals cheerleader prior to her wrestling career.

== Professional wrestling career ==
=== Knokx Pro Entertainment (2015-2016) ===
Kamela trained with Rikishi and Gangrel at Knokx Pro Entertainment, where she appeared as a ring announcer before making her in-ring debut.

=== WWE (2016–2021) ===
On April 12, 2016, it was announced that Kamela had signed with WWE, where she was assigned to the WWE Performance Center in Orlando, Florida. She made her WWE NXT debut shortly after at a live event, under her real name. Her television debut took place on the October 5, 2016, episode of NXT, working as an enhancement talent, where she was defeated by Peyton Royce. She made another appearance on the October 19 episode of NXT, where she was defeated by Nikki Cross, but the decision was later reversed because Cross continued to attack Kamela. On June 28, 2017, Kamela returned to television under the new ring name Vanessa Borne, where she defeated Jayme Hachey in a Mae Young Classic qualifier match. On July 13, she was eliminated from the tournament in the first round by Serena Deeb. Towards the rest of the year and the beginning of 2018, Borne continued to compete against various competitors such as Liv Morgan, Nikki Cross, Kairi Sane, and Dakota Kai, however, she ended up on the losing side against all of them.

On February 13, 2019, Borne started an alliance with Aliyah, after she helped her defeat Taynara Conti. In their first match together, Borne and Aliyah defeated Conti and Xia Li. On the November 27 episode of NXT, she faced Li in a losing effort after Li kayfabe injured Aliyah with a spin kick to her nose. Borne was reportedly called up to the main roster in January 2020 upon re-signing her contract, but after months of inactivity, she was released on May 19, 2021.

=== All Elite Wrestling / Ring of Honor (2022–present) ===
On the February 5, 2022 tapings of AEW Dark, Kamela made her debut in a losing effort against Marina Shafir. On the April 19, 2022 episode of AEW Dark, Kamela won her first AEW match by defeating Rache Chanel. On April 20, Kamela appeared on AEW Dynamite, competing against Dr. Britt Baker, losing in a qualifying match for the Owen Hart Foundation Tournament. On February 27, 2023, she wrestled Athena in a ROH Women's World Championship Eliminator Match. On the May 7, 2023 Ring of Honor Wrestling tapings, Kamela made her debut in a match against Ashley D'Amboise. On the March 13, 2026 episode of Ring of Honor Kamela returned to ROH, but lost to Marina Shafir.

== Championships and accomplishments ==
- KnokX Pro Entertainment
  - European Cruiserweight Championship (1 time)
- PCW Ultra
  - PCW Ultra Women's Championship (1 time, current)

== Filmography ==
=== Film ===
Year	Title	Role	Notes
2013	Foursome	Waitress	TV film
2017	Kingdom of Gladiators: The Tournament	Kyla	
2025	The Rendezvous	Donovan	
