= WWE 2K20 =

2019 video game

- Cover art featuring Becky Lynch and Roman Reigns
- Developer: Visual Concepts
- Publisher: 2K
- Director: Lynell Jinks
- Writer: Sean Conway
- Series: WWE 2K
- Platforms: Microsoft Windows; PlayStation 4; Xbox One
- Release: October 22, 2019
- Genre: Sports
- Modes: Single-player, multiplayer

WWE 2K20 is a professional wrestling video game developed by Visual Concepts and published by 2K. It was released worldwide on October 22, 2019, for Microsoft Windows, PlayStation 4, and Xbox One. It is the twenty-first installment of the WWE series, the seventh under the WWE 2K banner, and the successor to WWE 2K19. 2K20 is the first game in the series not to be developed by Yuke's, which had developed every entry in the series since its inception in 2000. Visual Concepts, who had previously worked with Yuke's as co-developers since 2014, took over as lead studio for the series.

WWE 2K20 received overwhelmingly negative reviews, with game critics noting a regression in quality compared to 2K19. The game has since gained notoriety in both the wrestling and gaming communities for its many bugs at launch, glitches and other technical issues. In response to its failure, 2K would cancel WWE 2K21 and put the series on hiatus for two years, with a spin-off, WWE 2K Battlegrounds, released in 2020, followed by the main series' return with WWE 2K22, which released on March 11, 2022.

== Gameplay ==
=== Game modes ===
WWE 2K20's 2K Showcase mode revolves around the Four Horsewomen of WWE (Bayley, Becky Lynch, Charlotte Flair and Sasha Banks), from Charlotte VS. Natalya for the NXT Women's Championship at NXT to a triple threat winner takes all match between Lynch, Flair and Ronda Rousey for the Raw and SmackDown Women's Championships at WrestleMania 35. Players take control of different unique models of Bayley, Banks, Lynch, and Flair, in 15 matches. The 2K Towers mode, first introduced in WWE 2K19, made its return to the series. WWE 2K20 features a female MyCareer story alongside its male story, the first for 2K. (Previous THQ games had female stories) The story is set in April 2029, where Red and Tre were inducted to the WWE Hall of Fame as members of the Class of 2029, which happened before WrestleMania 45 in Las Vegas, Nevada (also known in-game as WrestleMania 2029, as a fictional version of that year's event), 11 years after the end of the WWE 2K19 MyCareer storyline, as in which, the matches follow the perspectives of their career before putting their spots on the line against Samoa Joe and Brooklyn Von Braun at WrestleMania 45 at the end of the story.

The WWE Towers Mode Returned, with one of the towers, known as a "Story Tower", centered around Roman Reigns, with matches with unique commentary from Extreme Rules in 2013, as a member of The Shield, with Seth Rollins, along with Dean Ambrose by their side, against Team Hell No (Daniel Bryan and Kane), to Stomping Grounds in 2019, against Drew McIntyre. All matches use the superstars' modern day counterparts and took place at the WrestleMania 35 arena.

== Release ==
WWE 2K20 is the first game in the series to be solely developed by Visual Concepts; previous entries were co-developed by Japanese developer Yuke's. Eminem was reported to be curating the soundtrack of the game early in development, but talks with the rapper fell through after the news was leaked before it was made official.

On August 5, 2019, 2K announced WWE 2K20, with a trailer announcing Becky Lynch and Roman Reigns as cover stars. In the trailer, it features various WWE Superstars and Legends attending a party at a huge mansion, before it's interrupted by Lynch crashing through the glass ceiling. Lynch then apologizes to the mansion's owner, who is revealed to be Hulk Hogan. Lynch then turns around to face Reigns, who soon praises her for the scene, before then revealing them as the cover stars and the tagline "Step Inside". This marks the first game in the WWE 2K series to feature a female cover star (most recently, THQ's WWE SmackDown vs. Raw 2007 featured Torrie Wilson on the NTSC cover of the game), and the first game since WWE All Stars to have more than one cover star.

The collector's edition was themed around the 20th anniversary of WWE SmackDown, including a signed card that featured a signed plaque from either Kurt Angle, Edge or Rey Mysterio, and a plaque featuring a piece of the SmackDown 2002–2008 ring mat.

=== Post-release content ===
Four expansions were released for the game as downloadable content under the banner "WWE 2K Originals", which include Showcase episodes, Story Towers, arenas, and character skins and accessories based on fantasy settings. All DLC expansions (except for "Bump in the Night") were made available as part of a season pass, while the season pass was bundled with the deluxe and collector's editions of the game. The first, "Bump in the Night" (which was also included as a pre-order bonus), is a horror-themed expansion centered upon Bray Wyatt's "The Fiend" persona, with a Showcase focusing on Finn Bálor, unleashing his true power as the "Demon King", fighting against "The Swampfather" Bray Wyatt and his forces, with Story Towers focusing on "The Fiend" Bray Wyatt, Fed-Up Sheamus, Twisted Nikki Cross, Final Girl Mandy Rose and Daniel Bryan, as well as Zombie Sasha Banks and ThanksRusev Day, the second expansion "Wasteland Wanderers" is a dystopian-themed expansion centered upon Seth the Wanderer in his quest to take down its overlord, Samoa Joe, in this Showcase, with Story Towers focusing on Survivor Elias, Survivor Rhea Ripley, Survivor Pete Dunne and Survivor Roman Reigns, as well as Artic Shield Roman Reigns and New Years Ricochet, the third is based on WWE's digital series Southpaw Regional Wrestling (a parody of local wrestling promotions in the 1980s), with a showcase focusing on the company under hostile takeover by Mr. Mackelroy (Tyler Breeze), purchasing the company and destroying it once and for all, until the Southpaw crew hoping to win the company's ownership back in a best-of-five series, with story towers focusing on Mr. Mackelroy (Tyler Breeze), Misfit Molly (Becky Lynch), The Perth Peppies (The IIconics) (Heather (Billie Kay) and Other Heather (Peyton Royce)) Big Bartholomew (Rusev), and Street Zack Ryder and Street Curt Hawkins (Zack Ryder and Curt Hawkins), and the fourth, "Empire of Tomorrow", carries a futuristic theme and a focus on female characters, with a showcase focusing on Hacker Asuka (who speaks in her native language of Japanese during commentary in this showcase), who turned down on her offer from the Authority Megacorp, led by chairwoman Alexa Bliss, hoping to take down the megacorp's forces in Neo-Osaka, with story towers focusing on Robot Hunter The Miz, Robot Hunter Keith Lee, Hacker Johnny Gargano and Hacker Io Shirai. The New Day's Xavier Woods, Kofi Kingston and Big E were shown in each DLC showcase's opening and ending cutscenes.

== Reception ==
Reception

Aggregate score
Aggregator	Score
Metacritic	(PC) 43/100 (PS4) 43/100 (XONE) 45/100

Review scores
Publication	Score
GameSpot	2/10
GamesRadar+	2.5/5
IGN	4.3/10
Shacknews	3/10

WWE 2K20 received "generally unfavorable reviews" on all platforms according to review aggregator Metacritic. Reviewers criticized the physics, graphics, targeting, change in controls and the numerous glitches.

Brian Fowler of IGN said the game was a "mess", and that the game's quality had degraded since its predecessor, and many of the character models looked like they had "crawled out of a PS2-era wrestling game." GamesRadar+'s Ben Wilson gave the verdict that "WWE 2K20 plays like a work-in-progress demo that's yet to be stress-tested – but there's a decent game somewhere under the hot mess." Writing for GameSpot, Richard Wakeling criticized the MyCareer mode, the new control layout and the numerous technical issues, and declared as the worst of the WWE 2K series, and the moment the series "hit rock bottom".

The game received notable backlash on social media platforms, where the hashtag #FixWWE2K20 began trending. Many players who purchased the collector's edition revealed that their art card was not signed, with Edge and 2K immediately sending the editions back for re-signs. At the start of 2020, the game was rendered almost unplayable due to a "Y2k20" bug.

WWE 2K20 was named among the worst games of 2019 by IGN, Metacritic, Mint and PlayStation Universe. The game was among the nominations for WrestleCrap's Gooker Award for the worst gimmick, storyline, or event in wrestling in 2019, losing to the main event of that year's Hell in a Cell. The site noted that Hell in a Cell having WWE 2K20 as its presenting sponsor may have foreshadowed the show's quality, remarking that "seeing the Gooker winner being sponsored by the second runner up for the award is a whole new rancid territory."

=== Series future ===
In April 2020, former WWE video games writer Justin Leeper reported that the successor to WWE 2K20, WWE 2K21 had been cancelled due to the pandemic as one of the reasons. The decision was made due to the impact of the COVID-19 pandemic on the video game industry and the poor sales and reception for 2K20. Leeper would go on to state that 2K would publish a different WWE game in 2020, while WWE 2K22 will be released in 2021 for current-gen consoles and "probably" PCs. However in 2021, WWE 2K22's release was delayed to March 2022.

In April 2020, during WWE's 1st Quarter Earnings Call, WWE Chairman Vince McMahon was asked if 2K21 was canceled, before he then turned the question over to WWE CFO, Frank Riddick, who revealed that the game was canceled. On April 27, 2020, 2K announced the spin-off title WWE 2K Battlegrounds, which was released on September 18, 2020, to mixed reviews.

== See also ==
- List of video games notable for negative reception
