= WWE 2K22 =

2022 video game

- Standard cover art featuring Rey Mysterio
- Developer: Visual Concepts
- Publisher: 2K
- Director: Lynell Jinks
- Producers: Michael Johnstone; John Race; Jonathan Rivera
- Designers: Jason Vandiver; Derek Donahue
- Programmers: Naganand Madhavapeddy; Jim Simmons; Romain Sason; Philip Watts
- Artist: Jeffrey Horn
- Writers: Andrea Listenberger; Anthony Pucillo; Chris DeJoseph; Matthew Thompson
- Series: WWE 2K
- Platforms: PlayStation 4; PlayStation 5; Windows; Xbox One; Xbox Series X/S
- Release: March 21, 2022
- Genre: Sports
- Modes: Single-player, multiplayer

WWE 2K22 is a 2022 professional wrestling sports video game developed by Visual Concepts and published by 2K. It is the twenty-second overall installment of the video game series based on WWE, the eighth game under the WWE 2K banner, and the successor to 2019's WWE 2K20. It was released on March 11, 2022, for PlayStation 4, PlayStation 5, Windows, Xbox One, and Xbox Series X/S. The follow-up title, WWE 2K23, was released on March 14, 2023.

== Gameplay ==
WWE 2K's MyCareer was rebranded as MyRISE and focused on separate stories for both male and female wrestlers. Using created characters, players can form alliances, make enemies, and branch into subplots based upon the players choices. This game did see the removal of the Advance Entrance option when creating a superstars custom entrance, instead leaving the only option to Easy Entrance.

The 2K Showcase Mode is rebranded as Showcase, featuring cover superstar Rey Mysterio, allowing players to play through the biggest moments of his WWE career, from his WCW Halloween Havoc 1997 matchup against Eddie Guerrero under the name, Rey Mysterio Jr., for the WCW Cruiserweight Championship to his Payback 2020 matchup with his son, Dominik Mysterio, against Seth Rollins and Murphy in a tag team match. The Showcase mode incorporates new features and updates. By progressing through, players are able to unlock new characters, attires, and arenas. At IGN Fan Fest 2022, a gameplay of the match between Rey Mysterio and Dolph Ziggler at SummerSlam 2009 featured a transition method between in-game to real-time action, with the referee's face being blurred, using both Greg Hamilton's recordings as the ring announcer in-game and archived audio, unlike in previous games, where the commentary has been re-recorded and archived audio is used in certain points during in-game cutscenes. The game features a new mode called MyFACTION. In it, players are able to build a wrestling stable by collecting, managing, and upgrading WWE wrestlers with regular updates and weekly events. MyFACTION features player cards from throughout WWE's history.

Universe Mode returned with several updates, including the ability to change camera angles while spectating matches. Other new features include playing as a single superstar, focusing only on their matches and storylines. MyGM, formerly known as GM Mode, returned to the series for the first time since 2007's WWE SmackDown vs. Raw 2008. Players can choose between Sonya Deville, Adam Pearce, William Regal, Shane McMahon, Stephanie McMahon, or a custom superstar to take control of one of WWE's four brands: Raw, SmackDown, NXT or NXT UK, determining the optional main championships for both the men's and women's divisions via either the start of a MyGM campaign or a title match during a MyGM campaign, which can have a boost a superstar's popularity or stamina, depending if a superstar is a face or a heel, if holding a championship, with an option to add the men's and women's tag team championships on Normal and Hard difficulties during a MyGM campaign via a tag team title match being added in the Version 1.9 patch on April 19, 2022, alongside the addition of the NXT 2.0 arena. Players can book wrestling shows in high school gyms and on primetime television, draft superstars, manage contracts, and control costs, while trying to create the premier WWE brand, from the WWE Draft to Wrestlemania (37 in this installment) across 12, 25 or 50 weeks, with weekly shows have three matches with up to two promos on Easy difficulty or four matches with up to three promos on Normal and Hard difficulties, premium live events (also known in-game as PPV events), which are held every four weeks on Easy difficulty or five weeks on Normal and Hard difficulties, have four matches with up to three promos on Easy difficulty or five matches with up to four promos on Normal and Hard difficulties and Wrestlemania, which is held on the final week of a MyGM campaign, have five matches with up to four promos. In the WWE Draft, each manager starts with $2.75 million and will have to choose a minimum of eight superstars from a pool of current superstars, along with an option to add custom superstars to the pool, with original superstars added to the pool, along with a separate pool which only has WWE Legends, during a MyGM campaign via free agent signings.

Community creations in the creation suite have cross-platform support for users who are signed in to a verified 2K account. Custom images can also be used in character select screens, which allowing the player to put their own photo(s) on screen. Furthermore, an in-game tutorial, featuring Coach Drew Gulak, taking place at the WWE Performance Center, with Rey Mysterio training with Gulak's NXT mentor, Matt Riddle, was added. Creator Safe Mode can now be toggled, aside of being automatically enabled when streaming via the console's built-in streaming feature (except for the cutscene audio, if disabled), which disables the music and cutscene audio, to avoid copyright infringement during gameplay.

2K announced the online features will be discontinued on January 3, 2024. Later during this month, the game and its DLCs got delisted from online stores.

== Development ==
After the overwhelming negative reception of WWE 2K20 from critics, as well as major technical issues in gameplay, WWE 2K franchise executive producer Patrick Gilmore promised that the next installment would rely more on the quality of the game. As a result, a follow-up, WWE 2K21, was canceled with a spin-off, WWE 2K Battlegrounds, instead released in 2020. WWE 2K22 was officially announced after a teaser trailer, featuring Cesaro and Rey Mysterio, aired during WrestleMania 37 in April 2021, with a "It Hits Different" tagline. The announcement came nearly a year after the cancellation of WWE 2K21.

During the July 23, 2021, episode of SmackDown, commentator Michael Cole revealed that WWE 2K22 would feature a rebuilt game engine and smoother controls; this was later confirmed by sources close to 2K. The second teaser trailer aired during SummerSlam in August 2021, announcing a release date of March 2022.

On November 18, 2021, a "Hit List" trailer was released, highlighting ten specific features emphasizing the game's tagline. In the trailer, it was revealed that GM Mode (called MyGM) would be making a return to the series for the first time since 2007's WWE SmackDown vs. Raw 2008, and that the game would feature redesigned gameplay controls.

On February 23, 2022, singer Machine Gun Kelly was announced as executive producer, accompanied by a short trailer which involved Kelly and WWE legend The Undertaker. The baseline soundtrack includes songs from artists such as Machine Gun Kelly, Yungblud, Bert McCracken, Wu-Tang Clan, KennyHoopla, Motörhead, Poppy, Royal Blood, Bring Me the Horizon, The Weeknd, Turnstile, Asking Alexandria, and Bad Bunny.

== Release ==
On January 20, 2022, a trailer for the game was released alongside the release date of March 11, 2022. Rey Mysterio was announced as the main cover star for the Deluxe and Standard editions.

The game has three editions: the "nWo 4-Life" edition, the "Deluxe" edition, and the "Standard" edition. The "nWo 4-Life" and "Deluxe" editions were released on March 8, three days ahead of the release of the "Standard" edition on March 11.

=== Post-release content ===
Downloadable content (DLC) packs are available through the Season Pass as well as available to purchase individually. The first DLC pack is the Banzai Pack that launched on April 26, 2022, and included Yokozuna, Umaga, Rikishi, Omos, and Kacy Catanzaro. On May 17, 2022, the Most Wanted Pack launched, which adds Cactus Jack, The Boogeyman, Vader, Ilja Dragunov, and Indi Hartwell. On June 7, 2022, the Stand Back Pack launched adding The Hurricane, Stacy Keibler, A-Kid, and Wes Lee (Nash Carter was scheduled to be in the pack, but was cut when he was released from WWE in early April.). On June 28, 2022, the Clowning Around Pack launched and included Doink the Clown, Ronda Rousey, The British Bulldog, Mr. T, Doudrop, and Rick Boogs. The final pack, titled The Whole Dam Pack, launched on July 19, 2022, and included Rob Van Dam, Logan Paul, Machine Gun Kelly, LA Knight, Xia Li, Commander Azeez, and Sarray. Additionally, both The Undertaker Immortal Pack (featuring a "Phantom" masked Undertaker from 1995, the "Lord of Darkness" Undertaker from 1999, and the Undertaker from his backyard match vs. AJ Styles at WrestleMania 36), previously released as preorder only, as well as the nWo 4-Life DLC (featuring playable nWo versions of "Hollywood" Hulk Hogan, Kevin Nash, Scott Hall, Syxx, and Eric Bischoff, the Bash at the Beach '96 and nWo Souled Out arenas, and the nWo Wolfpac Championship) were released as additional standalone DLC packs.

The NXT 2.0 arena, along with several new create-a-superstar parts, were added as free DLC through the 1.09 patch.

Several MyRise exclusive superstars, along with additional new create-a-superstar parts, were added as another free DLC through the 1.12 patch. These included: Alexa Bliss from 2020, Dominik Dijakovic, King Booker, King Corbin, pre-A.S.H. Nikki Cross, Shawn Michaels from 2018, and pre-King Shinsuke Nakamura.

== Reception ==
Reception

Aggregate score
Aggregator	Score
Metacritic	(PC) 72/100 (PS4) 76/100 (PS5) 77/100 (XBSX) 78/100

Review scores
Publication	Score
Destructoid	6.5/10
Game Informer	8/10
GameSpot	7/10
GamesRadar+	3.5/5
Hardcore Gamer	4/5
HobbyConsolas	78/100
IGN	8/10
Push Square	7/10
Shacknews	6/10
The Games Machine (Italy)	8.5/10

WWE 2K22 received "generally favorable reviews" for the PlayStation 4, PlayStation 5, and Xbox Series X/S versions and "mixed or average reviews" for the Windows version according to review aggregator Metacritic respectively. Critics generally regarded 2K22 as a massive improvement from its predecessor as well as one of the series' best modern entries despite its issues.

Zoey Handley of Destructoid praised the new modes and improvements made to the game engine, modified physics, and AI but felt that "On the surface, we're looking at exactly the same game... WWE 2K22 is an improvement, it doesn't feel like a step in the right direction", and criticized the game's unintuitive customization suit, janky gameplay, and desire to remain a competitive simulation. Marcus Stewart of Game Informer called 2K22 "the most entertaining — and most of all, playable — WWE game in some time", and lauded its more polished, arcade-style gameplay, improved character models, smoother animations, and new modes, while taking minor issue with unstable online play, occasionally unresponsive controls, and some overly complicated maneuvers. Richard Wakeling of GameSpot thought favorably of the revamped in-ring action, increased defensive options, and the MyRISE mode but disliked the frustrating multi-person matches, shallow MyGM mode, and the roster omissions present in the Showcase mode. GamesRadar+'s Ben Wilson similarly wrote positively about the combo-heavy wrestling mechanics, addictive MyFaction mode, and called the facelikenesses "the best this series has seen", but thought too many issues made a return from prior entries and that the MyGM mode lacked depth. Mitchell Saltzman of IGN stated, "while [2K22 is] far from a complete ground-up rebuild, it's quite possibly the biggest leap forward the series has ever seen", and lauded the visual overhaul, removal of bugs, improved combat, and the depth present in the MyRISE and MyGM modes. Push Square's Ben Potter gave the title 7 stars out of 10 and wrote, "...skipping 2K21 and delaying the release by five months may have caused the roster to be largely outdated, but the game is stable, plays great, and is practically bursting at the seams with content." Chris Jarrard of Shacknews reviewed the game more negatively and largely panned the outdated roster, half-baked modes, lack of a next-gen visual upgrade, and the Creation Suite's navigability and omissions.

=== Sales ===
WWE 2K22 debuted as #2 in digital video game sales chart in the United Kingdom, overtaking Gran Turismo 7. Digital launch sales were also 390% higher than WWE 2K20, and overall game sales were double of the previous installment.
