= Battle Riot VII =

2025 Major League Wrestling event

- Promotional poster featuring various wrestlers
- Promotion: Major League Wrestling
- Date: April 5, 2025
- City: Long Beach, California
- Venue: Thunder Studios Arena
- Attendance: 2,021

Event chronology
← Previous; SuperFight 6	Next → Azteca Lucha

Battle Riot chronology
← Previous; VI	Next → VIII

Battle Riot VII was a professional wrestling live streaming event event produced by Major League Wrestling (MLW), which took place on April 5, 2025, at Thunder Studios Arena in Long Beach, California. It was the seventh event under the Battle Riot chronology. The event streamed live on MLW's YouTube channel.

== Production ==
=== Background ===
Battle Riot is an annual event produced by Major League Wrestling that was first held in 2018 as a television taping for MLW Fusion. The event is named after the Battle Riot match, a multi-competitor match type in which wrestlers are eliminated until one is left and declared winner. The match begins with a number of participants in the ring, who are then eliminated by either pin, submission, or going over the top rope and having both feet touch the venue floor. The declared winner of the Battle Riot match receives a "golden ticket", which they can redeem for a future MLW World Heavyweight Championship title shot anytime and anywhere, however in this year, World Heavyweight Championship will be on the line in this Battle Riot.

On December 2, 2024, it was announced that Battle Riot VII would take place on April 5, 2025, at the Commerce Casino & Hotel in Commerce, California. On March 21, 2025, MLW decided to move the event to larger Thunder Studios Arena in Long Beach, California.

=== Storylines ===
The card will consist of matches that result from scripted storylines, where wrestlers portray villains, heroes, or less distinguishable characters in scripted events that built tension and culminate in a wrestling match or series of matches, with results predetermined by MLW's writers.

At SuperFight 6, after Matt Riddle defended the MLW World Heavyweight Championship against Satoshi Kojima and Alex Kane, he was confronted by the executive producer for the night Eric Bischoff on the video wall. Bischoff was unhappy with Riddle, who went over Bischoff and made the match himself; Bischoff had previously fired Kane at One Shot the past December, but Riddle circumvented that decision by bringing Kane back through MLW's "Open Door" policy. As such, Bischoff retaliated by declaring that, for the first time, Riddle would defend the MLW World Heavyweight Championship at Battle Riot VII in the titular match.

At SuperFight 6, MLW announced that Tokyo Joshi Pro-Wrestling (TJPW) wrestler Shoko Nakajima would make her MLW debut at Battle Riot VII. A few weeks later on MLW's website, the company confirmed that Nakajima would challenge Delmi Exo for the MLW World Women's Featherweight Championship at the event.

At SuperFight 6, MLW World Middleweight Champion Místico teamed with Máscara Dorada to face Templario and Esfinge. The match ended with the latter team victorious, with Templario pinning Místico. This marked the first time Místico had ever been pinned in MLW. Immediately after, Cesar Duran came out to speak with Templario, who put out a challenge to Místico for the MLW World Middleweight Championship. Duran proposed the match for Battle Riot VII, which Místico accepted. The match was made official via MLW's website on March 4. On May 4, however, MLW announced that the match would be cancelled due to Místico sustaining an injury. A three-way match between Templario, Esfinge, and Hechicero would replace the title match, with Místico still appearing at the event for a live interview.

== Results ==
No.	Results	Stipulations	Times
1	Atlantis, Atlantis Jr., and Star Jr. defeated Último Guerrero, Bárbaro Cavernario, and Magnus by pinfall	Trios match	11:48
2	Janai Kai defeated Himawari by pinfall	Singles match	7:24
3	Templario defeated Hechicero and Esfinge by submission	Three-way match	9:51
4	Shoko Nakajima defeated Delmi Exo (c) by pinfall	Singles match for the MLW World Women's Featherweight Championship	9:15
5	Matt Riddle (c) won by last eliminating Rob Van Dam	40-man Battle Riot match for the MLW World Heavyweight Championship	1:06:31
(c) / – the champion(s) heading into the match

=== Battle Riot match entrances and eliminations ===
Draw	Entrant	Order	Eliminated by	Method of elimination	Elimination(s)
1	Alex Hammerstone	28	Matt Riddle	Over the top rope	7
2	Raj Dhesi	16	Alex Hammerstone	Over the top rope	1
3	Atlantis Jr.	2	Magnus	Over the top rope	0
4	Virus	1	Raj Dhesi	Pinfall	0
5	Jesús Rodríguez	14	Alex Hammerstone	Over the top rope	1
6	Star Jr.	5	Alex Hammerstone	Over the top rope	0
7	Esfinge	6	Alex Hammerstone	Over the top rope	0
8	Ikuro Kwon	3	Alex Hammerstone	Submission	0
9	Bárbaro Cavernario	4	Alex Hammerstone	Over the top rope	0
10	Blue Panther	10	Hechicero	Pinfall	1
11	Magnus	11	Jesús Rodríguez	Over the top rope	1
12	Juicy Finau	15	Alex Hammerstone	Over the top rope	0
13	Último Guerrero	8	Blue Panther	Submission	1
14	Atlantis	7	Último Guerrero	Submission	0
15	Hechicero	12	Mr. Thomas	Over the top rope	1
16	Okumura	9	Mr. Thomas	Over the top rope	0
17	Ariel Dominguez	13	Mr. Thomas	Over the top rope	0
18	Mr. Thomas	18	Matt Riddle	Over the top rope	3
19	Journey Fatu	17	Alex Hammerstone	Over the top rope	0
20	Bobby Fish	19	Paul Walter Hauser and Paul London	Over the top rope	0
21	C. W. Anderson	21	Paul Walter Hauser	Pinfall	0
22	Chris Adonis	20	Matt Riddle	Over the top rope	0
23	Paul Walter Hauser	22	Brock Anderson	Over the top rope	2
24	Brett Ryan Gosselin	24	Matt Riddle and Satoshi Kojima	Over the top rope	0
25	Matt Riddle (c)	–	–	Winner	8
26	Brock Anderson	23	Paul London	Over the top rope	1
27	Paul London	25	Bishop Dyer	Over the top rope	2
28	Alex Kane	26	Bishop Dyer	Over the top rope	0
29	Matthew Justice	27	Mads Krule Krügger	Over the top rope	0
30	Satoshi Kojima	31	Mads Krule Krügger	Over the top rope	1
31	Bishop Dyer	37	Rob Van Dam	Over the top rope	3
32	Kushida	30	Donovan Dijak	Over the top rope	0
33	Shane Haste	29	Mads Krule Krügger	Over the top rope	0
34	Mads Krule Krügger	36	Matt Riddle and Rob Van Dam	Over the top rope	3
35	Tom Lawlor	34	Donovan Dijak	Over the top rope	1
36	Donovan Dijak	38	Rob Van Dam	Over the top rope	2
37	Anthony Greene	33	Matt Riddle and Tom Lawlor	Over the top rope	0
38	Titus Alexander	35	Bishop Dyer	Over the top rope	0
39	Dr. Dax	32	Matt Riddle	Over the top rope	0
40	Rob Van Dam	39	Matt Riddle	Over the top rope	2
