= List of Major League Wrestling events =

This is a list of professional wrestling pay-per-view (PPV), supercard, and streaming events held by Major League Wrestling (MLW).

From 2018 to 2023, select matches from MLW's supercard events were presented as part of special episodes of MLW Fusion, the MLW Fusion: Alpha mini-series, and MLW Underground Wrestling. Between 2018 and 2019, portions of several supercard events, as well as a pre-show for 2019's Saturday Night SuperFight PPV, were broadcast live as Fusion specials; the remaining matches on those cards would air later on broadcast delay. Other events (namely Battle Riot III, the 2021 Fightland event, and Battle Riot IV) would air as standalone TV specials – equivalent to a PPV.

In 2023, MLW began a partnership with TrillerTV to air live events through the latter's subscription service; its first event would be Never Say Never on July 8 of that year. Since January 2024, in addition to those monthly live events, MLW has also presented a free, taped special for BeIN Sports USA and MLW's YouTube channel. Beginning in Summer 2024, MLW's live events would be moved to their YouTube channel as part of the launch of the promotion's new YouTube channel membership program. Live events would be broadcast live for free beginning with Battle Riot VI.

== Pay-per-view and streaming events ==
=== 2019 ===
Date	Event	Venue	Location	Main event	Notes
November 2	Saturday Night SuperFight	Cicero Stadium	Cicero, Illinois	Jacob Fatu (c) vs. LA Park in a No Disqualification match for the MLW World Heavyweight Championship	
(c) – refers to the champion(s) heading into the match

=== 2023 ===
Date	Event	Venue	Location	Main event	Notes
July 8	Never Say Never	2300 Arena	Philadelphia, Pennsylvania	Alexander Hammerstone (c) vs. Alex Kane for the MLW World Heavyweight Championship	
September 3	Fury Road	2300 Arena	Philadelphia, Pennsylvania	Alex Kane (c) vs. Willie Mack for the MLW World Heavyweight Championship	
October 14	Slaughterhouse	2300 Arena	Philadelphia, Pennsylvania	Alex Kane (c) vs. Tom Lawlor for the MLW World Heavyweight Championship	
November 18	Fightland	2300 Arena	Philadelphia, Pennsylvania	Alex Kane (c) vs. Jacob Fatu for the MLW World Heavyweight Championship	
December 7	One Shot	Melrose Ballroom	New York City, New York	Alex Kane (c) vs. Matt Cardona for the MLW World Heavyweight Championship; Additional matches were taped for the "Holiday Rush" TV special.	
(c) – refers to the champion(s) heading into the match

=== 2024 ===
Date	Event	Venue	Location	Main event	Notes
January 6	Kings of Colosseum	2300 Arena	Philadelphia, Pennsylvania	Matt Riddle vs. Jacob Fatu; Additional matches were taped for the "Reload" TV special.	
February 3	SuperFight	2300 Arena	Philadelphia, Pennsylvania	Alex Kane (c) vs. Satoshi Kojima for the MLW World Heavyweight Championship; Additional matches were taped for "The Burning Crush" TV special.	
February 29	Intimidation Games	Melrose Ballroom	New York City, New York	Satoshi Kojima (c) vs. Minoru Suzuki for the MLW World Heavyweight Championship; Additional matches were taped for the "Once Upon A Time In New York" TV special.	
March 29	War Chamber	St. Petersburg Coliseum	St. Petersburg, Florida	Team MLW (CozyMax (Satoshi Kojima and Shigeo Okumura) and The Second Gear Crew (Matthew Justice and 1 Called Manders)) vs. World Titan Federation (Tom Lawlor, Davey Boy Smith Jr., Richard Holliday, and Josh Bishop) in a War Chamber match Additional matches were taped for the "War Chamber II" TV special.	
May 11	Azteca Lucha	Cicero Stadium	Cicero, Illinois	Místico (c) vs. Bárbaro Cavernario for the MLW World Middleweight Championship; Additional matches were taped for the "Fury Road" TV special.	Co-produced with Consejo Mundial de Lucha Libre
June 1	Battle Riot VI	Center Stage	Atlanta, Georgia	40-man Battle Riot match Additional matches were taped for the "MLW Anniversary '24" TV special.	
July 12	Blood & Thunder	St. Petersburg Coliseum	St. Petersburg, Florida	Matt Riddle vs. Sami Callihan in a No Ropes Deathmatch for Riddle's MLW World Heavyweight Championship title shot Additional matches were taped for the "Never Say Never" TV special.	
August 29	Summer of the Beasts	Melrose Ballroom	New York City, New York	Místico vs. Atlantis Jr. in the 2024 Opera Cup tournament quarterfinal match	
September 14	Fightland	Center Stage	Atlanta, Georgia	Kenta vs Místico in the 2024 Opera Cup tournament finals Additional matches were taped for the "Pit Fighters" TV special.	
November 9 (Aired November 10)	Lucha Apocalypto	Cicero Stadium	Cicero, Illinois	Mistico (c) vs. Titán vs. Averno in a three-way match for the MLW World Middleweight Championship; Additional matches were taped for the "Slaughterhouse" TV special.	Co-produced with Consejo Mundial de Lucha Libre. Aired on November 10 due to technical difficulties.
December 5	One Shot	Melrose Ballroom	New York City, New York	CozyMax (Okumura and Satoshi Kojima) vs. Contra Unit (Ikuro Kwon and Minoru Suzuki) (c) for the MLW World Tag Team Championship; Additional matches were taped for the "Holiday Rush" TV special.	Branded as Eric Bischoff's One Shot due to the event being booked by wrestling executive Eric Bischoff
(c) – refers to the champion(s) heading into the match

=== 2025 ===
Date	Name	Venue	Location	Main event	Notes
January 11	Kings of Colosseum	NYTEX Sports Centre	North Richland Hills, Texas	Satoshi Kojima (c) vs. Matt Riddle for the MLW World Heavyweight Championship; Additional matches were taped for the "Reloaded" TV special.	
February 8	SuperFight 6	Center Stage	Atlanta, Georgia	Matt Riddle (c) vs. Satoshi Kojima vs. Alex Kane for the MLW World Heavyweight Championship; Additional matches were taped for the "Intimidation Games" TV special.	
April 5	Battle Riot VII	Thunder Studios Arena	Long Beach, California	40-man Battle Riot match for the MLW World Heavyweight Championship	
May 2	CMLL vs. MLW	Arena Mexico	Mexico City, Mexico	Mistico vs. Kushida	Co-produced with Consejo Mundial de Lucha Libre; Spanish language exclusive broadcast
May 10	Azteca Lucha	Cicero Stadium	Cicero, Illinois	Místico vs. Templario vs. Ikuro Kwon; Additional matches were taped for the "War Chamber" TV special.	Co-produced with Consejo Mundial de Lucha Libre
June 26	Summer of the Beasts	Melrose Ballroom	Queens, New York	Matt Riddle (c) vs. Kenta for the MLW World Heavyweight Championship; Additional matches were taped for the "Blood and Thunder" TV special.	
September 13	Fightland	NYTEX Sports Centre	North Richland Hills, Texas	Matt Riddle (c) vs. Donovan Dijak (with Saint Laurent) vs. Mads Krügger for the MLW World Heavyweight Championship; Additional matches were taped for the "Fury Road" TV special.	
October 4	Slaughterhouse	Thunder Studios Arena	Long Beach, California	Místico vs. Último Guerrero in a 2025 Opera Cup quarterfinal match Additional matches were taped for the "Symphony of Horrors" TV special.	
November 20	MLW x Don Gato Tequila: Lucha de los Muertos	Charleston Music Hall	Charleston, South Carolina	Killer Kross vs. Matt Riddle	
(c) – refers to the champion(s) heading into the match

=== 2026 ===
Date	Name	Venue	Location	Main event	Notes
January 29 (aired February 5)	Battle Riot VIII	Osceola Heritage Park Events Center	Kissimmee, Florida	40-man Battle Riot match for the MLW World Heavyweight Championship	
November 7	Saturday Night SuperFight	Cicero Stadium	Cicero, Illinois	Killer Kross (c) vs. Josh Bishop in a Last Man Standing match for the MLW World Heavyweight Championship	First MLW PPV since 2019.
(c) – refers to the champion(s) heading into the match

== Supercard events ==
=== 2002 ===
Date	Event	Venue	Location	Main event
June 15	Genesis	Viking Hall	Philadelphia, Pennsylvania	Shane Douglas vs. Taiyo Kea vs. Vampiro to crown the inaugural MLW World Heavyweight Champion
September 26	Reload	Manhattan Center	New York City, New York	Satoshi Kojima (c) vs. Jerry Lynn for the MLW World Heavyweight Championship
December 20	King of Kings	War Memorial Auditorium	Fort Lauderdale, Florida	Satoshi Kojima (c) vs. Vampiro for the MLW World Heavyweight Championship
(c) – refers to the champion(s) heading into the match

=== 2003 ===
Date	Event	Venue	Location	Main event	Notes
May 9	Revolutions	Tabu Night Club	Orlando, Florida	Terry Funk vs. Steve Corino	
June 20	Hybrid Hell	War Memorial Auditorium	Fort Lauderdale, Florida	Terry Funk vs. Steve Corino	
July 26	Rise of the Renegades	Tabu Night Club	Orlando, Florida	"Dr. Death" Steve Williams and The Sandman vs. The Extreme Horsemen (CW Anderson and Simon Diamond)	
August 22	Summer Apocalypse	St. Petersburg Coliseum	St. Petersburg, Florida	Jerry Lawler vs. Terry Funk	
September 19	WarGames	War Memorial Auditorium	Fort Lauderdale, Florida	The Funkin' Army (Bill Alfonso, Sabu, "Dr. Death" Steve Williams, Terry Funk and The Sandman) vs. The Extreme Horsemen (Barry Windham, CW Anderson, PJ Walker, Simon Diamond and Steve Corino)	
(c) – refers to the champion(s) heading into the match

=== 2004 ===
Date	Event	Venue	Location	Main event	Notes
January 9	Reloaded	Tabu Night Club	Orlando, Florida	Homicide vs. Low Ki	
January 10	Reloaded	Tabu Night Club	Orlando, Florida	CW Anderson and Simon Diamond (c) vs. The Samoan Island Tribe (Samu and Mana) in a Weapons match for the MLW Global Tag Team Championship	
(c) – refers to the champion(s) heading into the match

=== 2017 ===
Date	Event	Venue	Location	Main event	Notes
October 5	One Shot	Gilt Nightclub	Orlando, Florida	Shane Strickland vs. Ricochet	
December 7	Never Say Never	Gilt Nightclub	Orlando, Florida	Darby Allin and Jimmy Havoc vs. John Hennigan and Shane Strickland	
(c) – refers to the champion(s) heading into the match

=== 2018 ===
Date	Event	Venue	Location	Main event	Notes
January 11	Zero Hour	Gilt Nightclub	Orlando, Florida	Jimmy Havoc vs. Shane Strickland	
February 8	Road To The World Championship	Gilt Nightclub	Orlando, Florida	Darby Allin vs. Sami Callihan	
March 8	Spring Break	Gilt Nightclub	Orlando, Florida	Joey Janela vs. Darby Allin	
April 12	The World Championship Finals	Gilt Nightclub	Orlando, Florida	Shane Strickland vs. Matt Riddle to crown the new MLW World Heavyweight Champion	
May 3	Intimidation Games	Gilt Nightclub	Orlando, Florida	Shane Strickland (c) vs. Pentagon Jr. for the MLW World Heavyweight Championship	
July 19	Battle Riot	Melrose Ballroom	Queens, New York	40 man Battle Riot match	
September 6	WarGames	War Memorial Auditorium	Fort Lauderdale, Florida	Barrington Hughes, John Hennigan, Kotto Brazil, Shane Strickland and Tommy Dreamer vs. Abyss, Jimmy Havoc, Sami Callihan and The Death Machines (Leon Scott and Sawyer Fulton)	
October 4	Fury Road	Melrose Ballroom	Queens, New York	LA Park vs. PCO	
November 8	Fightland	Cicero Stadium	Cicero, Illinois	The Lucha Brothers (Pentagon Jr. and Rey Fénix) (c) vs. El Hijo de LA Park and LA Park for the MLW World Tag Team Championship	
December 13	Never Say Never	Scottish Rite Temple	Miami, Florida	Teddy Hart vs. Pentagon Jr.	
December 14	Zero Hour	Scottish Rite Temple	Miami, Florida	Low Ki (c) vs. Konnan for the MLW World Heavyweight Championship	First part broadcast as a live episode of Fusion
(c) – refers to the champion(s) heading into the match

=== 2019 ===
Date	Event	Venue	Location	Main event	Notes
February 2	SuperFight	2300 Arena	Philadelphia, Pennsylvania	Low Ki (c) vs. Tom Lawlor for the MLW World Heavyweight Championship	First part broadcast as a live episode of Fusion
March 2	Intimidation Games	Cicero Stadium	Cicero, Illinois	Tom Lawlor (c) vs. Low Ki for the MLW World Heavyweight Championship	First part broadcast as a live episode of Fusion
April 4	Rise of the Renegades	Melrose Ballroom	Queens, New York	LA Park vs. Pentagon Jr.	
April 5	Battle Riot II	Melrose Ballroom	Queens, New York	40 man Battle Riot match	First part broadcast as a live episode of Fusion
June 1	Fury Road	Waukesha County Expo Center	Waukesha, Wisconsin	Teddy Hart (c) vs. Jimmy Havoc for the MLW World Middleweight Championship	First part broadcast as a live episode of Fusion
July 6	Kings of Colosseum	Cicero Stadium	Cicero, Illinois	Tom Lawlor (c) vs. Jacob Fatu for the MLW World Heavyweight Championship	First part broadcast as a live episode of Fusion
July 25	Never Say Never	Melrose Ballroom	Queens, New York	LA Park vs. Jimmy Havoc	
September 7	War Chamber	NYTEX Sports Centre	North Richland Hills, Texas	Marshall Von Erich, Ross Von Erich, Low Ki and Tom Lawlor vs. Contra Unit (Jacob Fatu, Josef Samael, Simon Gotch and Ikuro Kwon) in a 4 vs. 4 War Chamber match	
October 5	The Crash/MLW show	Auditorio Fausto Gutierrez Moreno	Tijuana, Baja California, Mexico	La Rebelión Amarilla (Bestia 666 and Mecha Wolf 450) and L.A. Park vs. Contra Unit (Ikuro Kwon, Josef Samael, and Simon Gotch)	Co-produced with The Crash Lucha Libre
November 9	Blood and Thunder	Gilt Nightclub	Orlando, Florida	Mystery Box Battle Royal	
December 5	Opera Cup	Melrose Ballroom	Queens, New York	Davey Boy Smith Jr. vs. Brian Pillman Jr. in the Opera Cup Tournament Final	
(c) – refers to the champion(s) heading into the match

=== 2020 ===
Date	Event	Venue	Location	Main event	Notes
January 11	Zero Hour	NYTEX Sports Centre	North Richland Hills, Texas	Mance Warner vs. Jimmy Havoc in a No Ropes Barbed Wire Match	
February 1	Fightland	2300 Arena	Philadelphia, Pennsylvania	Jacob Fatu (c) vs. CIMA for the MLW World Heavyweight Championship	
March 13	AAA vs MLW	Auditorio Fausto Gutierrez Moreno	Tijuana, Baja California, Mexico	La Familia Real (L.A. Park, El Hijo de L.A. Park, and L.A. Park Jr.) vs. Psycho Clown, Nicho el Millonario, and Niño Hamburguesa	Co-produced with Lucha Libre AAA Worldwide and Promociones EMW
(c) – refers to the champion(s) heading into the match

=== 2021 ===
Date	Event	Venue	Location	Main event	Notes
July 10	Battle Riot III	2300 Arena	Philadelphia, Pennsylvania	41-man Battle Riot match	
October 2	Fightland	2300 Arena	Philadelphia, Pennsylvania	Jacob Fatu (c-World) vs. Alexander Hammerstone (c-National) in a Title vs. Title No Disqualification match for the MLW World Heavyweight Championship and the MLW National Openweight Championship	
November 6	War Chamber	2300 Arena	Philadelphia, Pennsylvania	Contra Unit (Ikuro Kwon, Jacob Fatu, Mads Krügger, Sentai Death Squad Soldier #1, and Sentai Death Squad Soldier #2) vs. The Hammerheads (Alexander Hammerstone, EJ Nduka, Richard Holliday, Matanza Duran, and Savio Vega) in a War Chamber match	
December 3	MLW Azteca/The Crash show	Auditorio Fausto Gutierrez Moreno	Tijuana, Baja California, Mexico	Pagano and Alexander Hammerstone vs. King Muertes and Taurus in an Apocalypto tag team match	Co-produced with The Crash Lucha Libre
(c) – refers to the champion(s) heading into the match

=== 2022 ===
Date	Event	Venue	Location	Main event	Notes
January 21	Blood & Thunder	Gilley's Dallas	Dallas, Texas	Jacob Fatu vs. Mads Krügger	
February 26	SuperFight	Grady Cole Center	Charlotte, North Carolina	The Von Erichs (Marshall Von Erich and Ross Von Erich) vs. Ricky Morton and Kerry Morton	
March 31	Intimidation Games	Gilley's Dallas	Dallas, Texas	The Von Erichs (Marshall Von Erich and Ross Von Erich) vs. 5150 (Danny Rivera and Hernandez) in a Bunkhouse Brawl	
April 1	Azteca Underground	Gilley's Dallas	Dallas, Texas	Jacob Fatu vs. Bestia 666 in an Azteca Apocalypto match Several matches were taped for the MLW Fusion "Rise of the Renegades" special.	
May 13	Kings of Colosseum	2300 Arena	Philadelphia, Pennsylvania	Jacob Fatu vs. Mads Krügger in a Weapons of Mass Destruction match	
June 23	Battle Riot IV	Melrose Ballroom	New York City, New York	40-man Battle Riot match	
August 27	Fury Road	Cathedral High School	El Paso, Texas	Alexander Hammerstone vs. Willie Mack (House show)	
September 18	Super Series	Space Event Center	Norcross, Georgia	Laredo Kid, Komander, and Microman vs. Mini Abismo Negro, Gino Medina, and Black Taurus	co-produced with Lucha Libre AAA Worldwide and Dragon Gate
October 30	Fightland	2300 Arena	Philadelphia, Pennsylvania	Jacob Fatu vs. Lio Rush	
(c) – refers to the champion(s) heading into the match

=== 2023 ===
Date	Event	Venue	Location	Main event	Notes
January 7	Blood and Thunder	2300 Arena	Philadelphia, Pennsylvania	Jacob Fatu vs. Ben-K	
February 4	SuperFight	2300 Arena	Philadelphia, Pennsylvania	Real1 vs. Microman vs. Mance Warner vs. Matthew Justice in a Dumpster match	
February 10	Super Series	Auditorio Fausto Gutierrez Moreno	Tijuana, Baja California, Mexico	Hijo del Vikingo, Psycho Clown, and Rey Horus vs. Johnny Caballero and La Empresa (Gringo Loco and Sam Adonis)	Co-produced with Lucha Libre AAA Worldwide and Promociones EMW
April 6	War Chamber	Melrose Ballroom	Queens, New York	The Calling (Rickey Shane Page, Akira, Delirious and Dr. Cornwallus) vs. Alexander Hammerstone and The Second Gear Crew (Mance Warner, Matthew Justice and 1 Called Manders) in a War Chamber match	
April 8	Battle Riot V	2300 Arena	Philadelphia, Pennsylvania	40-man Battle Riot match	
(c) – refers to the champion(s) heading into the match

=== 2026 ===
Date	Name	Venue	Location	Main event	Notes
February 7	Lucha Apocalypto	Cicero Stadium	Cicero, Illinois	Bishop Dyer vs. Mads Krule Krügger	Co-produced with Consejo Mundial de Lucha Libre
April 12	Fantastica Mania USA	Festival Hall	Charleston, South Carolina	Mads Krule Krügger vs. Big Damo	Co-produced with Consejo Mundial de Lucha Libre and New Japan Pro-Wrestling.
May 9	Kings of Colosseum	The Signal	Chattanooga, Tennessee	Killer Kross (c) vs. Josh Bishop in a No Holds Barred match for the MLW World Heavyweight Championship	
June 12	Summer of the Beasts	2300 Arena	Philadelphia, Pennsylvania	Killer Kross (c) vs. Donovan Dijak for the MLW World Heavyweight Championship	
September 12	Fightland	Festival Hall	Charleston, South Carolina	Austin Aries vs. Matt Riddle in the 2026 Opera Cup Finals	
October 3	Slaughterhouse	Center Stage	Atlanta, Georgia	Battle royal	
(c) – refers to the champion(s) heading into the match

== TV Specials ==
Several matches were taped during MLW events exclusively for these special TV broadcasts.

=== 2021 ===
Date	Air date	Name	Venue	Location	Main event	Event	Notes
N/A	January 6	Kings of Colosseum	GILT Nightclub	Orlando, Florida	Alexander Hammerstone (c) vs. Mads Krügger for the National Openweight Championship (MLW Fusion special taped behind closed doors)	Fusion	
N/A	March 31	Never Say Never	GILT Nightclub	Orlando, Florida	Jacob Fatu (c) vs. Calvin Tankman for the World Heavyweight Championship (MLW Fusion special taped behind closed doors)	Fusion	
October 2	October 7	Fightland	2300 Arena	Philadelphia, Pennsylvania	Jacob Fatu (c-World) vs. Alexander Hammerstone (c-National) in a Title vs. Title No Disqualification match for the MLW World Heavyweight Championship and the MLW National Openweight Championship		
(c) – refers to the champion(s) heading into the match

=== 2022 ===
Date	Air date	Name	Venue	Location	Main event	Event	Notes
April 1	June 9	Rise of the Renegades	Gilley's Dallas	Dallas, Texas	The Von Hammers (Alexander Hammerstone, Marshall Von Erich and Ross Von Erich) vs King Muertes, Mads Krügger and Richard Holliday (MLW Fusion special episode)	Azteca Underground	
(c) – refers to the champion(s) heading into the match

=== 2023 ===
Date	Air date	Name	Venue	Location	Main event	Event	Notes
December 12	December 23	Holiday Rush	Melrose Ballroom	New York City, New York	Jacob Fatu vs. Alex Hammerstone	One Shot	
(c) – refers to the champion(s) heading into the match

=== 2024 ===
Date	Air date	Name	Venue	Location	Main event	Event	Notes
January 6	January 20	Reload	2300 Arena	Philadelphia, Pennsylvania	Satoshi Kojima vs. Sami Callihan	Kings of Colosseum	
February 2	February 17	The Burning Crush	2300 Arena	Philadelphia, Pennsylvania	Jacob Fatu vs Mads Krule Krügger in a Baklei Brawl	SuperFight	
February 29	March 16	Once Upon A Time In New York	Melrose Ballroom	New York City, New York	Alex Kane and CozyMax (Satoshi Kojima and Okumura) vs. World Titan Federation (Tom Lawlor, Richard Holliday, and Josh Bishop)	Intimidation Games	
March 29	April 20	War Chamber II	St. Petersburg Coliseum	St. Petersburg, Florida	Death Fighters (Raven, Akira, Jake Crist, and Jimmy Lloyd) vs. The Calling (Rickey Shane Page, Sami Callihan, Cannonball, and Dr. Cornwallis) in a War Chamber match	War Chamber	
May 11	May 18	Fury Road	Cicero Stadium	Cicero, Illinois	Satoshi Kojima (c) vs. 1 Called Manders for the MLW World Heavyweight Championship	Azteca Lucha	
June 1	June 22	MLW Anniversary '24	Center Stage	Atlanta, Georgia	Mads Krule Krügger vs. 1 Called Manders in a Bullrope match	Battle Riot VI	
July 12	August 10	Never Say Never	St. Petersburg Coliseum	St. Petersburg, Florida	Contra Unit (Mads Krule Krügger, Minoru Suzuki, and Ikuro Kwon) vs Satoshi Kojima, Matt Riddle, and Akira	Blood & Thunder	
August 29	September 7	Summer of the Beasts: Part 2	Melrose Ballroom	New York City, New York	Bobby Fish vs Timothy Thatcher	Summer of the Beasts	
September 14	September 26	Pit Fighters	Center Stage	Atlanta, Georgia	Matt Riddle vs. Tom Lawlor in a Vale Tudo Rules match	Fightland	
November 9	November 23	Slaughterhouse	Cicero Stadium	Cicero, Illinois	Mads Krule Krügger vs. Akira in a Weapons of Mass Destruction match	Lucha Apocalypto	
December 5	December 24	Holiday Rush	Melrose Ballroom	New York City, New York	Satoshi Kojima (c) vs. Último Guerrero for the MLW World Heavyweight Championship	One Shot	
(c) – refers to the champion(s) heading into the match

=== 2025 ===
Date	Air date	Name	Venue	Location	Main event	Event	Notes
January 11	January 25	Reloaded	NYTEX Sports Centre	North Richland Hills, Texas	Místico (c) vs. Bárbaro Cavernario in a Two out of three falls match for the MLW World Middleweight Championship	Kings of Colosseum	
February 8	March 8	Intimidation Games	Center Stage	Atlanta, Georgia	Filthy Bros (Matt Riddle and Tom Lawlor) vs. Contra Unit (Mads Krule Krügger and Ikuro Kwon)	SuperFight 6	
May 10	June 7	War Chamber	Cicero Stadium	Cicero, Illinois	The Bomaye Fight Club (Alex Kane and Mr. Thomas), Matthew Justice and Paul London vs. The Rogue Horsemen (Bobby Fish, Brett Ryan Gosselin, Brock Anderson and C. W. Anderson) in a War Chamber match	Azteca Lucha	
June 26	August 9	Blood and Thunder	Melrose Ballroom	Queens, New York	Místico vs. Ikuro Kwon in a 2025 Opera Cup Tournament first round match	Summer of the Beasts	
September 13	September 21	Fury Road	NYTEX Sports Centre	North Richland Hills, Texas	Austin Aries vs. Kushida in a 2025 Opera Cup Tournament first round match	Fightland	
October 4	October 25	Symphony of Horrors	Thunder Studios Arena	Long Beach, California	Místico vs. Austin Aries in a 2025 Opera Cup semifinal match	Slaughterhouse	
(c) – refers to the champion(s) heading into the match

=== 2026 ===
Date	Air date	Name	Venue	Location	Main event	Event	Notes
April 12	August 8	Blood and Thunder	Festival Hall	Charleston, South Carolina	Killer Kross (c) vs. Satoshi Kojima for the MLW World Heavyweight Championship	Fantastica Mania USA	
(c) – refers to the champion(s) heading into the match

== Upcoming events ==
Pay-per-view and livestreaming events

=== 2026 ===
Date	Name	Venue	Location	Main event	Notes
(c) – refers to the champion(s) heading into the match

=== TBD ===
TV Specials

=== 2026 ===
Date	Name	Venue	Location	Main event	Notes
(c) – refers to the champion(s) heading into the match
