= Lance Anoaʻi =

American professional wrestler (born 1992)

Personal information
- Born: Lance Sterling Anoaʻi; February 15, 1992 (age 34) Allentown, Pennsylvania, U.S.
- Spouse: Canesha White
- Children: 2
- Parent: Samu (father)
- Family: Anoaʻi

Professional wrestling career
- Ring name: Lance Anoai
- Billed height: 6 ft 1 in (1.85 m)
- Billed weight: 225 lb (102 kg)
- Trained by: Wild Samoans
- Debut: April 3, 2010

Lance Sterling Anoaʻi (born February 15, 1992) is an American professional wrestler. He previously wrestled in Major League Wrestling (MLW), where he is a former MLW World Tag Team Champion, and in Pro Wrestling Noah. He is a member of the Anoaʻi family.

== Early life ==
Lance Anoaʻi was born in Allentown, Pennsylvania, to a prominent wrestling family. His father Samula worked in the World Wrestling Federation under the ring name Samu as a member of The Wild Samoans and The Samoan SWAT Team/The Headshrinkers. His uncles are Afa Anoaʻi Jr. (better known as Manu) and Lloyd Anoaʻi (better known as L.A. Smooth). Anoaʻi grew up surrounded by professional wrestling. As a child, he attended MLW shows with his father and uncle, and later in his career, he shared the ring with them.

== Professional wrestling career ==
=== Independent circuit (2010–2024, 2025–present) ===
Anoaʻi debuted on April 3, 2010, winning a match for a show promoted by the National Wrestling League vs. Chrono Chris in Martinsburg, West Virginia. He was in World Xtreme Wrestling which is owned by his grandfather, Afa Anoaʻi. He often was involved in matches with his kins Samu, Afa Jr. and Sean Maluta.

Anoaʻi wrestled for Maryland Championship Wrestling (MCW), debuting in August 2012. He made his debut for Pro Wrestling Syndicate (PWS) in 2012. At Supercard 2013, Anoaʻi was involved in a battle royal for the number-one contender for the PWS Heavyweight Championship on Night 1 and on Night 2, he had a match with Sonjay Dutt. Anoaʻi competed for the PWS Tri State Championship in a Six Way Match at PWS Return to Rahway on September 20, 2013, that included Craven Varro, Starman, Facade, Pat Buck and The Drunken Swashbuckler. At the Shane Shamrock Memorial Cup 2013, he fought Luke Hawx on August 10, 2013, and lasted until the semi-finals.

In 2013, he made his first of many appearances in House of Hardcore (HOH). In April 2019, he won the 23rd annual East Coast Wrestling Association (ECWA) Super 8 Tournament.

On August 17, 2026, Anoa'i announced that he will retire from professional wrestling in March 2027.

=== Major League Wrestling (2018–2023) ===
On March 3, 2018, he made his debut with Major League Wrestling (MLW) at their event "Spring Break". In the match, he lost to Maxwell Jacob Friedman. In July 2018 he participated in the first-ever Battle Riot at the namesake event, which was won by Tom Lawlor. In October 2018, he started teaming with his father Samu in MLW as The Samoan Island Tribe. In early 2019 he would feud with Rich Swann resulting in losses in singles and tag team matches. In April 2019, he competed in the second Battle Riot, again unsuccessfully.

On January 7, 2023, Anoaʻi as a member of The Samoan SWAT Team with Juicy Finau defeated Hustle & Power (EJ Nduka and Calvin Tankman) for the MLW World Tag Team Championships at MLW Blood and Thunder. On July 8 at Never Say Never, Anoa'i and Finau lost the titles to The Calling (Akira and Rickey Shane Page), ending their reign at 182 days. On October 29, Anoa'i announced on X that he was granted his release from MLW.

=== Pro Wrestling Noah (2023) ===
On June 22, 2023, Anoaʻi was announced as participant in the N-1 Victory 2023.

=== WWE ===
==== Sporadic appearances (2015, 2017, 2019) ====
On the January 2, 2015 edition of WWE SmackDown, Anoaʻi made his WWE debut as an enhancement talent, teaming with Rhett Titus in a losing effort against The Ascension. On February 1, 2017, he and Titus appeared at a WWE NXT event against The Authors of Pain, where he would lose. This appearance was related to a tryout he was having with WWE. In April 2019, he fought at another WWE tryout. Anoaʻi made another appearance on the May 27, 2019, show of WWE Raw, where he faced Shane McMahon, and eventually losing the match by submission after Drew McIntyre attacked him outside the ring, and was subsequently beaten down by McMahon and McIntyre after the match, until his cousin Roman Reigns made the save.

==== NXT (2024–2025) ====
It was reported that Anoaʻi had signed with WWE in the Summer of 2024 and had been assigned to its NXT brand. On October 10, 2025, it was announced he had been released from his contract, not having wrestled a single match during his time.

== Championships and accomplishments ==
- Major League Wrestling
  - MLW World Tag Team Championship (1 time) - with Juicy Finau
- Pro Wrestling Illustrated
  - Ranked No. 324 of the top 500 singles wrestlers in the PWI 500 in 2024
