= Alexander Hammerstone =

American professional wrestler (born 1991)

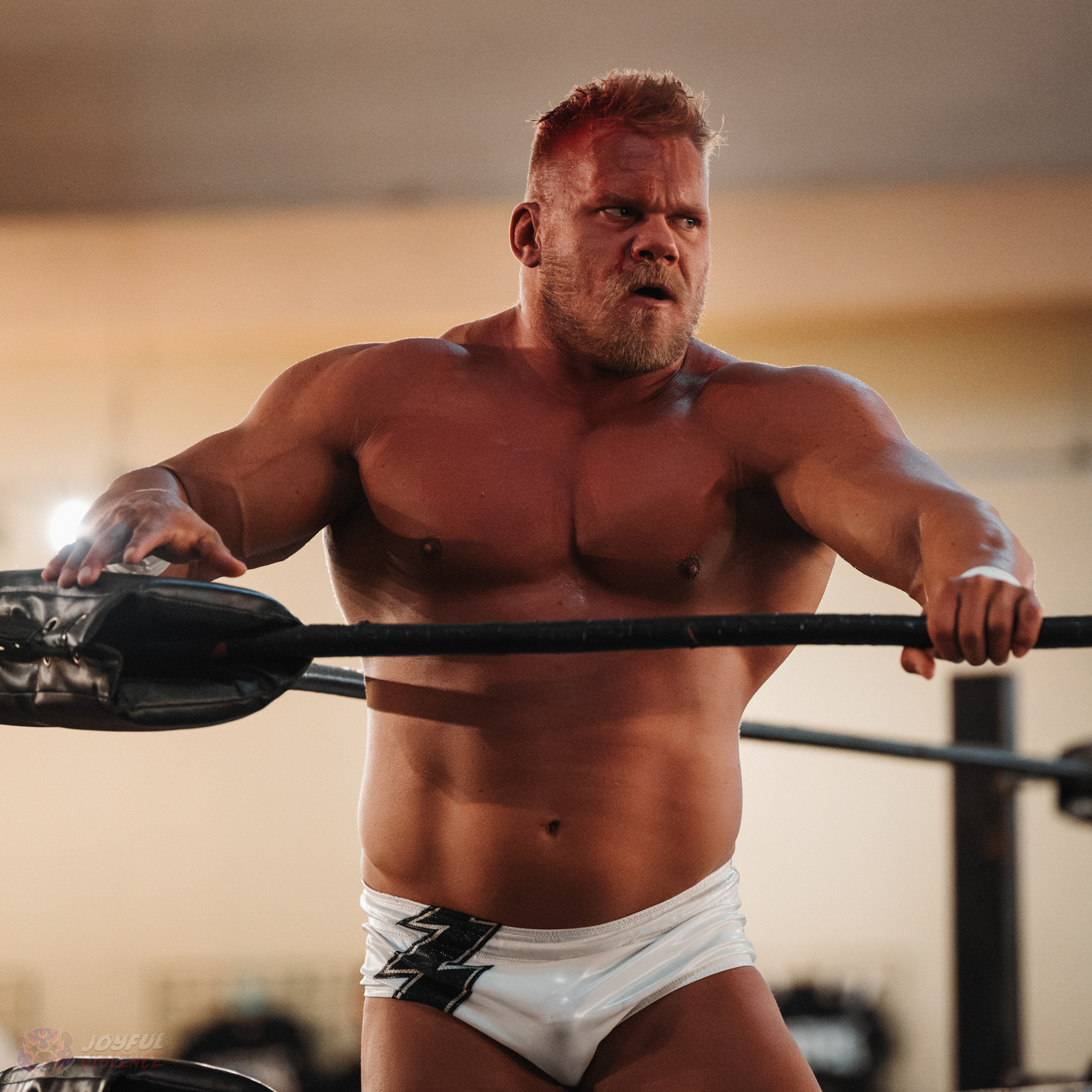
- Hammerstone in February 2024

Personal information
- Born: Alex Rohde; January 17, 1991 (age 35) Glendale, Arizona

Professional wrestling career
- Ring name(s): Alexander Hammerstone; Alex Hammerstone; Hammerstone
- Billed height: 6 ft 2 in (188 cm)
- Billed weight: 264 lb (120 kg)
- Trained by: Hawaiian Lion
- Debut: August 10, 2013

Alex Rohde (born January 17, 1991), better known by the ring name Alexander Hammerstone or simply Hammerstone, is an American professional wrestler. He is performing on the independent circuit. He is best known for his time in Major League Wrestling (MLW), where he was a former MLW World Heavyweight Champion, the inaugural and longest reigning MLW National Openweight Champion, and the winner of Battle Riot III. He is also known for his time in Total Nonstop Action Wrestling (TNA), through which he also made appearances on WWE's NXT brand.

== Professional wrestling career ==
=== Early career (2013–2016) ===
Rohde debuted on the Arizona independent circuit in 2013 with Championship Wrestling from Arizona (CWFA) and Arizona Wrestling Federation (AWF) under the ring name Alexander Hammerstone. In 2014, he wrestled in Las Vegas for Paragon Pro Wrestling (PPW) and Future Stars of Wrestling (FSW) and West Coast Wrestling Connection (WCWC) in Oregon. There he won his first championship, the WCWC Legacy Championship, in 2014, which he held for 132 days. He followed that later in 2014 with the WCWC Tag Team Championship with partner Grappler 3 (as The Wrecking Crew). Later in 2014, Hammerstone capped his time at WCWC by winning the WCWC Pacific Northwest Championship. In 2015, Hammerstone had a tryout with WWE. In April 2015, he won the PPW Tag Team Championship. In February 2016, he would participate in another WWE tryout. Around this time he also did extra work for the company, one time appearing as Tyler Breeze's bodyguard.

=== Independent circuit (2016–present) ===
In 2016, Hammerstone started working in California where he appeared for Championship Wrestling from Hollywood and made his debut for PCW Ultra. In 2017, he won the FSW Championship from Eli Drake. During the next two years he would hold the FSW Championship for over 600 combined days. He would receive additional tryouts from WWE in October 2017 and February 2018.

In 2018, he started being pushed heavily in PCW Ultra, getting wins against veteran wrestlers such as Jeff Cobb, Brian Cage, Daga, Brody King, A. C. H., and Timothy Thatcher. In September of that year, at PCW Ultra Vision Quest, he challenged Penta El Zero M for the PCW Ultra Heavyweight Championship in a losing effort. That same year, he would wrestle for the nationally broadcast Ring Warriors during their first season.

On January 3, 2019, Hammerstone competed in a one night tournament for West Coast Pro Wrestling at their event, When the Smoke Clears, to crown the first WCPW Heavyweight Champion. He defeated Tyler Bateman in the finals. In January 2019, he also competed on Impact Wrestling's Impact Xplosion, making his debut for the promotion.

=== Major League Wrestling (2019–2026) ===
==== The Dynasty (2019–2021) ====
On February 2, 2019, Hammerstone debuted for Major League Wrestling (MLW). His first match featured him in a squash match against Ariel Dominguez. On the March 16 episode of Fusion, Hammerstone attacked The Hart Foundation (Teddy Hart, Brian Pillman Jr. and Davey Boy Smith Jr.) and joined the villainous stable The Dynasty, the other members including Richard Holliday and Maxwell Jacob Friedman. Hammerstone later defeated Pillman on the March 23 episode of Fusion.

During WrestleMania 35 weekend, he wrestled in the second annual Battle Riot match at the namesake event as the #34 entrant. He eliminated Brian Pillman Jr., Ariel Dominguez and Davey Boy Smith Jr., lasting until the final four until being eliminated by Mance Warner. On the April 26 episode of Fusion, Dynasty defeated Hart Foundation in a tables match. The match ended with Hammerstone putting Pillman through the table. Hammerstone was announced for the tournament to crown the inaugural National Openweight Champion. He defeated Gringo Loco in the semi-final on the May 11 episode of Fusion, and Brian Pillman Jr. in the final at Fury Road on June 1 to become the first National Openweight Champion.

Hammerstone successfully defended the title against Kotto Brazil at Kings of Colosseum, Davey Boy Smith Jr. via disqualification on the July 20 episode of Fusion and the Caribbean Heavyweight Champion Savio Vega on the August 10 episode of Fusion. On the October 12 episode of Fusion, Hammerstone defended the title against the Crash Heavyweight Champion Rey Horus in a title versus title match. Hammerstone lost via disqualification after interference by the Dynasty. The feud between Dynasty and the Hart Foundation continued as Hammerstone successfully defended the National Openweight Championship against Davey Boy Smith Jr. at MLW's first pay-per-view event Saturday Night SuperFight. After a successful title defense against Douglas James on the November 23 episode of Fusion, Hammerstone participated in the inaugural Opera Cup tournament, where he defeated his teammate MJF in the quarterfinal but lost to the eventual winner Davey Boy Smith Jr. in the semifinal.

Hammerstone continued to successfully defend the National Openweight Championship against the likes of Aero Star, T-Hawk and Laredo Kid in 2020 before MLW went on hiatus due to the COVID-19 pandemic. The storyline explanation was that Contra Unit attacked several MLW wrestlers and hijacked MLW's headquarters. MLW resumed holding events in November. It was explained in storyline that Hammerstone was a primary force in retrieving MLW from Contra Unit's occupation. The first episode of Fusion in several months took place on November 18, where Hammerstone defeated Jason Dugan and demanded a title shot against Jacob Fatu for the MLW World Heavyweight Championship due to being ranked #1 in MLW by Pro Wrestling Illustrated (PWI). Hammerstone confronted Fatu later that night but was attacked by Contra's newest member, the debuting Mads Krügger, turning Hammerstone into a fan favorite. As a result, Hammerstone began feuding with Krügger, leading to a match between the two for Hammerstone's National Openweight Championship at Kings of Colosseum on January 6, 2021. The match ended in a double count-out resulting in Hammerstone retaining the title. Hammerstone defeated Krügger in a Baklei Brawl on the March 2 episode of Fusion to end the feud.

==== World Heavyweight Champion (2021–2023) ====
After successfully defending the National Openweight Championship against the likes of L.A. Park and Mil Muertes, Hammerstone participated in the Battle Riot match as the #35 entrant at Battle Riot III on July 24, 2021. Hammerstone eliminated the Sentai Death Squad, Josef Samael, Simon Gotch, Daivari and lastly Mads Krügger to win the Battle Riot, thus earning the Golden Ticket which required Hammerstone to cash-in for a World Heavyweight Championship match anytime and anywhere. After retaining the National Openweight Championship against Tom Lawlor on the September 29 episode of Fusion: Alpha, Hammerstone defeated Jacob Fatu in a title versus title match to win the World Heavyweight Championship and retain his National Openweight Championship at Fightland, which aired on October 7. As a result of winning the World Heavyweight Championship, Hammerstone relinquished the National Openweight Championship, ending his two-year reign at 865 days. The following month, at War Chamber, Hammerstone led The Hammerheads (EJ Nduka, Richard Holliday, Matanza Duran and Savio Vega) to defeat the Contra Unit in the titular match.

He then feuded with Cesar Duran after he refused the promoter's offer, feuding with Black Taurus and King Muertes. On the premiere episode of Azteca on January 6, 2022, Hammerstone and Pagano defeated Taurus and Muertes in an Apocalypto Hardcore match. However, Pagano turned on Hammerstone, taking him on a warehouse, where Richard Holliday rescued him. On the January 27 episode of Azteca, Hammerstone retained the World Heavyweight Championship against Octagon Jr. Hammerstone successfully defended the World Heavyweight Championship against Pagano in a falls count anywhere match on the February 10 episode of Fusion. After the match, Holliday turned on Hammerstone by attacking him, thus breaking up the Dynasty.

Hammerstone retained the World Heavyweight Championship against Davey Richards at SuperFight and Jacob Fatu and Mads Krügger in a three-way match at Intimidation Games. Hammerstone continued his feud with Holliday. At Rise of the Renegades, Hammerstone teamed with The Von Erichs (Marshall and Ross) as The Von Hammers against King Muertes, Mads Krügger and Richard Holliday in a losing effort in a six-man tag team match. Hammerstone successfully defended the World Heavyweight Championship against Holliday at Kings of Colosseum. On the November 24 episode of Fusion, Hammerstone defeated Holliday in a falls count anywhere match to retain the title and end the feud. Hammerstone would then retain the title against various contenders, such as Bandido, EJ Nduka in a last man standing match, Yamato, and Jacob Fatu at SuperFight. On July 8, 2023 at Never Say Never, Hammerstone lost the title to Alex Kane, ending his reign at 644 days.

==== World Titan Federation (2023) ====
As part of a worked shoot angle, Hammerstone stated on October 28, 2023 that he had requested his release from MLW. At Fightland, after Alex Kane had successfully defended the MLW World Heavyweight Championship against Jacob Fatu, Matt Cardona, Tom Lawlor and other members of World Titan Federation attacked Alex Kane. The lights went down in the arena, which led to Hammerstone making his return to MLW, attacking Fatu, and aligning with World Titan Federation, thus turning heel for the first time since 2020. At MLW Holiday Rush, Hammerstone wrestled Jacob Fatu in a losing effort. After the match, Hammerstone thanked MLW and Court Bauer for giving him an opportunity to wrestle in MLW. Hammerstone then said that his contract with MLW was up on January 1, 2024, and he might have wrestled his last MLW match. with reports linking him to both WWE and All Elite Wrestling (AEW).

==== Return to Major League Wrestling (2025) ====
At Battle Riot VII Hammerstone made his return to Major League Wrestling (MLW) entering the Battle Riot match for the MLW World Heavyweight Championship which was won by Matt Riddle. At Azteca Lucha, Hammerstone defeated Satoshi Kojima. At Summer of the Beasts, Hammerstone competed for the Three-way match for the MLW National Openweight Championship which was won by Último Guerrero.

=== Pro Wrestling Noah (2019) ===
On July 26, 2019, MLW announced a working agreement with Japanese based promotion Pro Wrestling Noah, which would include a talent-exchange agreement and content collaboration between the two promotions On July 29, it was announced that Hammerstone would represent MLW by participating in the 2019 N1-Victory, where he wrestled in Block A from August 18 to September 16.

=== Total Nonstop Action Wrestling (2024–2025) ===
Hammerstone returned to TNA (formerly Impact) on January 13, 2024 at Hard To Kill, losing to Josh Alexander. On the February 29 episode of TNA Impact!, it was announced that Hammerstone had signed with the promotion and would face Alexander in a rematch at Sacrifice on March 8. During the bout, as the referee was on the mat recovering after being accidentally struck, Hammerstone would turn heel, hitting Alexander with a low blow, then the Nightmare Pendulum (his version of a swinging side slam), allowing him to score the victory. Hammerstone took Alexander's headgear as a trophy after the match. On April 20 at Rebellion, Hammerstone was defeated by Alexander in the third match, which was a Last Man Standing match. On August 22, 2024 episode of Impact!, Hammerstone defeated Kushida to qualify for the Ultimate X match for the TNA X Division Championship at Emergence, which was won by Zachary Wentz.

On the September 12 episode of Impact!, Hammerstone lost to Steve Maclin. At Victory Road, Hammerstone and Jake Something defeated Eric Young and Steve Maclin. At Bound for Glory, Hammerstone competed in the 20-person Intergender Call Your Shot Gauntlet which was won by Frankie Kazarian. At Turning Point, Hammerstone competed in the Six-way Thanksgiving Turkey Bowl match which was won by Joe Hendry. His final match in TNA took place on the March 13, 2025, episode of Impact! where Hammerstone competed for the TNA World Championship where he lost to Joe Hendry.

Hammerstone departed from TNA on March 7, 2025, when his contract expired.

=== WWE (2024) ===
On September 10, 2024, amidst a talent exchange between TNA and WWE's NXT brand, Hammerstone made a surprise appearance on the September 10, 2024 episode of NXT, being revealed as Tony D'Angelo handpicked opponent to face NXT North American Champion Oba Femi in a non-title match, where he was defeated. On the September 17 episode, he defeated D'Angelo via countout.

=== Maple Leaf Pro Wrestling (2025–present) ===
On July 6, 2025 at MLP Resurrection, Hammerstone made his debut for Maple Leaf Pro Wrestling, unsuccessfully challenging to Rohan Raja for the PWA Champion's Grail.

== Championships and accomplishments ==
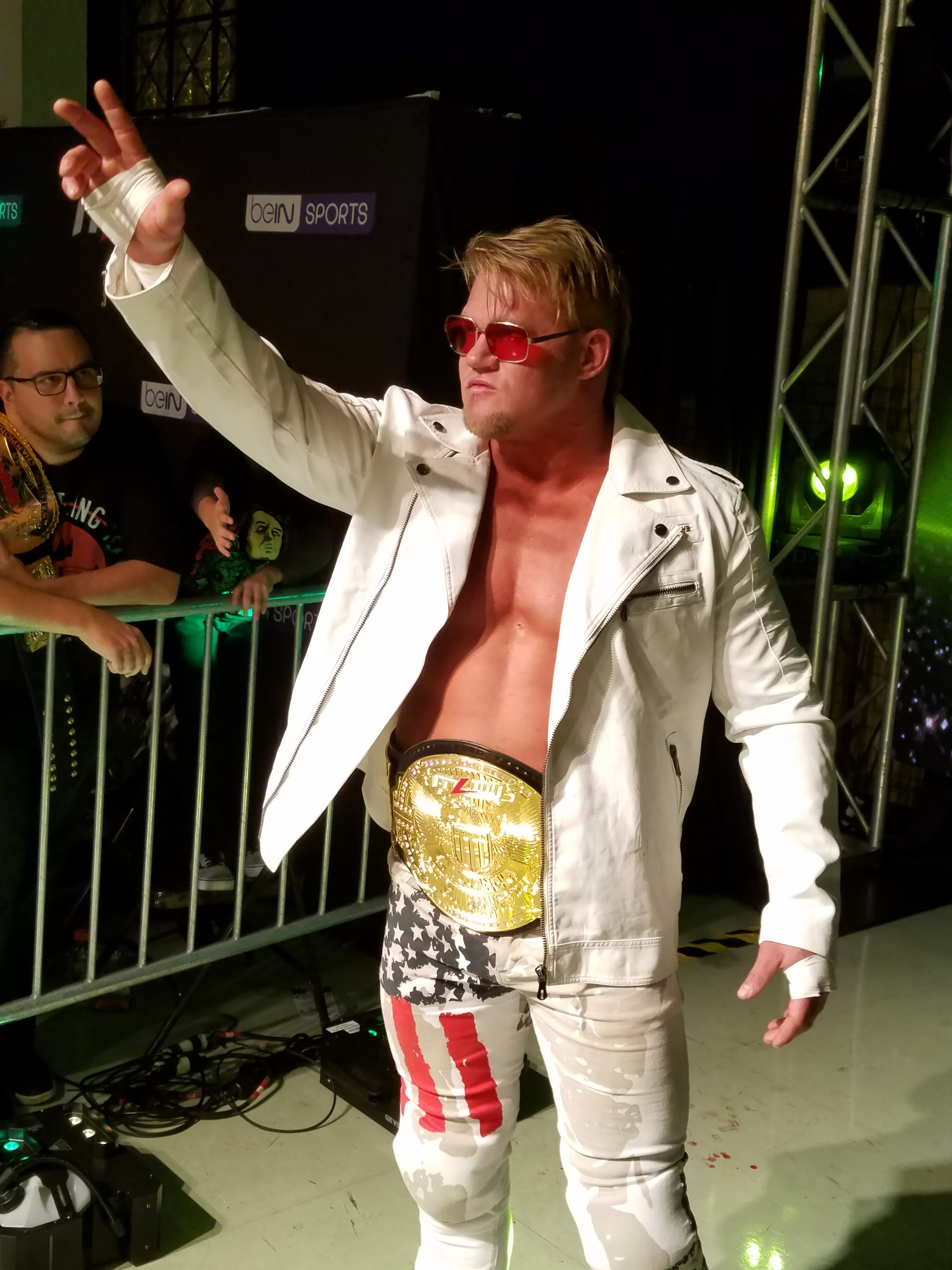
Hammerstone during his reign as MLW National Openweight Champion.

- AAW Wrestling
  - AAW Tag Team Championship (1 time) – with Ace Perry
- All-Star Wrestling At Gray-Bell
  - ASW Heavyweight Championship (1 time)
- Arizona Wrestling Federation
  - AWF State Championship (1 time)
  - AWF Tag Team Championship (2 times) – with Joe Graves
- DREAMWAVE Wrestling
  - Good as Gold Rumble (2016)
- Destiny World Wrestling
  - DWW Championship (1 time)
- Future Stars of Wrestling
  - FSW Heavyweight Championship (3 times)
  - FSW Nevada State Championship (1 time)
  - FSW Tag Team Championship (1 time) – with Joe Graves
- Global Syndicate Wrestling
  - GSW World Championship (1 time, inaugural, final)
- Lions Pride Sports
  - Lions Pride Sports 360 Championship (1 time)
- Major League Wrestling
  - MLW World Heavyweight Championship (1 time)
  - MLW National Openweight Championship (1 time)
  - Battle Riot (2021)
  - MLW National Openweight Championship Tournament (2019)
- New Tradition Lucha Libre
  - NTLL Heavyweight Championship (3 time)
- Paragon Pro Wrestling
  - PPW Tag Team Championship (1 time) – with Alex Chamberlain
- Lucha Libre VOZ
  - VOZ Ultra Championship (1 time)
- Power Precision Pro Wrestling
  - 3PW Tag Team Championship (1 time) – with Joe Graves
- PCW Ultra
  - PCW Ultra Heavyweight Championship (1 time)
- Pro Wrestling Illustrated
  - Ranked No. 24 of the top 500 singles wrestlers in the PWI 500 in 2022
- West Coast Pro Wrestling
  - WCPW Heavyweight Championship (1 time, inaugural)
  - WCPW Heavyweight Championship Tournament (2019)
- West Coast Wrestling Connection
  - WCWC Legacy Championship (1 time)
  - WCWC Pacific Northwest Championship (2 times)
  - WCWC Tag Team Championship (1 time) – with The Grappler 3
- WrestlingKult
  - King of Kult (2024)
- Assault Wrestling Alliance
  - AWA Open Challenge Championship (1 time, current)
