= Battle Riot II =

2019 MLW wrestling event

- Promotional poster featuring various wrestlers
- Promotion: Major League Wrestling
- Date: April 5, 2019
- City: New York City, New York
- Venue: Melrose Ballroom
- Attendance: 1,000

Event chronology
← Previous; Rise of the Renegades	Next → Fury Road

Battle Riot chronology
← Previous; I	Next → III

MLW Fusion special episodes chronology
← Previous; Intimidation Games	Next → Fury Road

Battle Riot II was a professional wrestling event produced by Major League Wrestling (MLW). It took place on April 5, 2019 at the Melrose Ballroom in New York, New York. The event aired live as a two-hour special episode of Fusion on beIN Sports. It was the second event under the Battle Riot chronology.

Twelve matches were contested at the event with four matches airing live at Battle Riot. The other seven matches were taped for future episodes of Fusion and one match was a non-televised match. The main event was the 39-man Battle Riot match, in which the winner would earn a future MLW World Heavyweight Championship opportunity. L. A. Park won the Battle Riot to earn the title shot. Also on the card, Teddy Hart retained the World Middleweight Championship against Ace Austin.

== Event ==
=== Preliminary matches ===
The event opened with a match in which Teddy Hart defended the World Middleweight Championship against Ace Austin. During the match, The Dynasty provided guest commentary and Hart snatched MJF's champagne then drank it and threw it in the security guard's face. Hart executed a diving Hart Destroyer and then a second Hart Destroyer on Austin for the win to retain the title. After the match, Hart berated MJF during an interview which led MJF to hit Hart with a bottle of champagne thus knocking him out with a concussion.

Next, Minoru Tanaka made his televised MLW debut against Myron Reed. Tanaka pinned Reed with a cradle for the win.

The next match to air on the Battle Riot special was a street fight, in which Tom Lawlor defended the World Heavyweight Championship against Jimmy Havoc. The match was taped at Rise of the Renegades on April 4. Havoc knocked out the referee when the referee warned him about repeatedly using the stapler. Lawlor would then execute a Death Valley Driver to Havoc onto the wood and then nailed an Acid Rainmaker to Havoc onto a chair and covered him for the pinfall but the referee was knocked out. A second referee arrived and then Lawlor hit Havoc with the chair in his jaw twice to win the match and retain the title.

=== Main event match ===
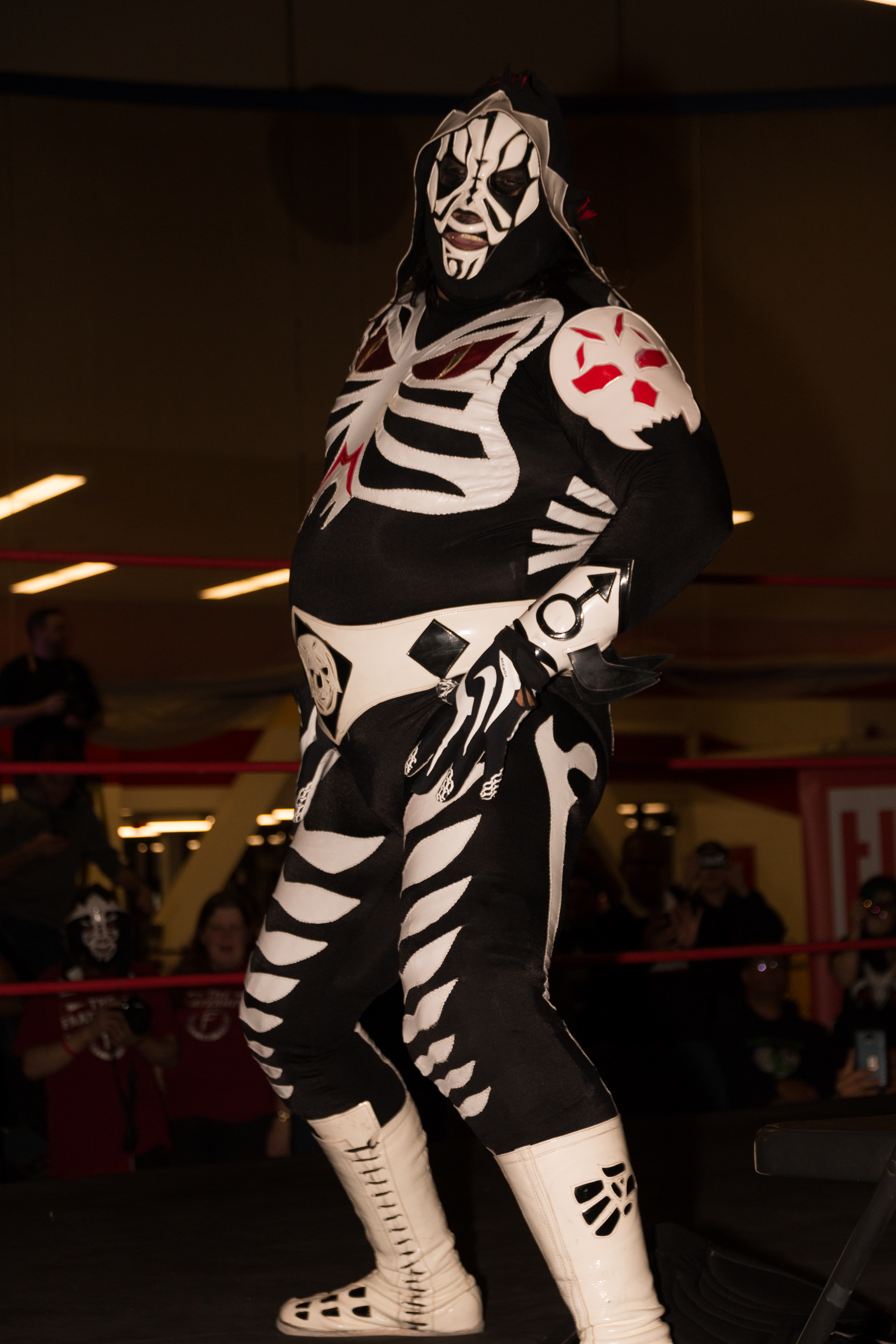
L. A. Park won the 2019 Battle Riot match to earn the Golden Ticket.

The main event was the namesake Battle Riot match, where the winner would earn a World Heavyweight Championship opportunity at any time and any place of his choosing within six months. Maxwell Jacob Friedman was the #1 entrant and Dan Severn was the #2 entrant. Teddy Hart was supposed to be the #16 entrant but he was unable to compete due to concussion suffered from the earlier attack by MJF. The #23 entrant Jacob Fatu attacked several of the competitors along with his Contra Unit teammates Josef Samael and Simon Gotch and poured gas on them which led to the security escorting Fatu away from the ring thus removing him from the match. The assault by Contra Unit allowed MJF to pin Jimmy Yuta, Rey Horus and Kotto Brazil in quick succession. The #26, #27 and #28 entrants were Santana, Ortiz and Konnan respectively. The three members of The Latin American Exchange brawled with The Hart Foundation, which resulted in Brian Pillman Jr. eliminating Santana and Ortiz and a brawl between Harts and LAX led Konnan to leave the ring. The final four participants were L. A. Park (#30), Alexander Hammerstone (#34), Sami Callihan (#35) and Mance Warner (#39). Warner and Hammerstone brawled with each other on the apron and Warner knocked him to eliminate. Hammerstone would then be eliminated by Callihan. Park nailed Callihan with a backbreaker and a spear and then tossed him over the top rope to win the Battle Riot and earn the Golden Ticket.

== Results ==
No.	Results	Stipulations
1^{D}	J-Rocc defeated Troy Hollywood	Singles match
2^{FT}	El Hijo de L.A. Park defeated Gringo Loco	Singles match
3^{FT}	Lucha Brothers (Pentagon Jr. and Rey Fenix) defeated Air Wolf and Rey Horus	Tag team match
4^{FT}	Mance Warner and Sami Callihan defeated El Hijo de L.A. Park and Ricky Martinez	Tag team match
5^{FT}	Alexander Hammerstone defeated Gringo Loco	Singles match MLW National Openweight Championship tournament semi-final
6^{FT}	Brian Pillman Jr. defeated Rich Swann	Singles match MLW National Openweight Championship tournament semi-final
7	Teddy Hart (c) defeated Ace Austin	Singles match for the MLW World Middleweight Championship
8	Minoru Tanaka defeated Myron Reed (with Rich Swann)	Singles match
9^{FT}	Tom Lawlor (c) defeated Avalanche	Singles match for the MLW World Heavyweight Championship
10	L. A. Park won by last eliminating Sami Callihan	39-man Battle Riot match for a future MLW World Heavyweight Championship opportunity
11^{FT}	Jacob Fatu and Josef Samael defeated Ace Romero and Barrington Hughes	Tag team match
12^{FT}	Low Ki defeated Daga	Singles match
13^{FT}	L. A. Park defeated Sami Callihan	Singles match
(c) / – the champion(s) heading into the match; D / – this was a dark match; FT / – the match was taped for a future broadcast of Fusion

=== Battle Riot match entrances and eliminations ===
Draw	Entrant	Order	Eliminated by	Method of elimination	Elimination(s)
1	Maxwell Jacob Friedman	22	Brian Pillman Jr.	Over the top rope	6
2	Dan Severn	5	Minoru Tanaka	Over the top rope	0
3	El Hijo de L.A. Park	7	Maxwell Jacob Friedman.	Over the top rope	1
4	Air Wolf	2	Unknown	Over the top rope	0
5	Minoru Tanaka	11	Rich Swann and Myron Reed	Over the top rope	3
6	Jordan Oliver	3	Ace Romero	Over the top rope	0
7	Rey Fénix	1	Maxwell Jacob Friedman	Over the top rope	0
8	Pentagón Jr.	4	El Hijo de L.A. Park	Over the top rope	0
9	Avalanche	16	Ace Romero	Over the top rope	2
10	Ace Romero	23	Davey Boy Smith Jr.	Over the top rope	5
11	Ken Kerbis	10	Ace Romero	Over the top rope	0
12	Leo Brien	6	Minoru Tanaka	Over the top rope	0
13	Michael Patrick	8	Minoru Tanaka	Submission	0
14	Gringo Loco	12	Avalanche	Over the top rope	0
15	Kotto Brazil	21	Maxwell Jacob Friedman	Pinfall	0
16	Teddy Hart	9	–	Withdrew due to concussion	–
17	Rey Horus	19	Maxwell Jacob Friedman	Pinfall	0
18	Rich Swann	15	Ace Romero	Pinfall	0
19	Myron Reed	13	Ace Romero and Barrington Hughes	Over the top rope	1
20	Barrington Hughes	14	Maxwell Jacob Friedman, Avalanche, Rey Horus and Ace Austin	Over the top rope	1
21	Ace Austin	17	Jimmy Yuta	Over the top rope	1
22	Jimmy Yuta	20	Maxwell Jacob Friedman	Pinfall	1
23	Jacob Fatu	18	–	Escorted out by security	0
24	Brian Pillman Jr.	27	Alexander Hammerstone	Over the top rope	1
25	Davey Boy Smith Jr.	36	Alexander Hammerstone	Over the top rope	5
26	Ortiz	25	Davey Boy Smith Jr.	Over the top rope	0
27	Santana	24	Davey Boy Smith Jr.	Over the top rope	0
28	Konnan	26	Himself	Over the top rope	0
29	Low Ki	29	Daga	Over the top rope	0
30	L. A. Park	–	Winner	–	2
31	Emil Sitoci	30	Davey Boy Smith Jr.	Over the top rope	0
32	Daga	32	L. A. Park	Over the top rope	1
33	The Blue Meanie	28	Sami Callihan	Pinfall	0
34	Alexander Hammerstone	37	Mance Warner	Over the top rope	3
35	Sami Callihan	39	L. A. Park	Over the top rope	2
36	Ariel Dominguez	31	Alexander Hammerstone	Over the top rope	0
37	Ricky Martinez	33	Mance Warner	Over the top rope	0
38	Lance Anoa'i	34	Richard Holliday	Pinfall	0
39	Mance Warner	38	Sami Callihan	Over the top rope	2
40	Richard Holliday	35	Davey Boy Smith Jr.	Over the top rope	0
