= Opera Cup (2020) =

2020 Major League Wrestling tournament

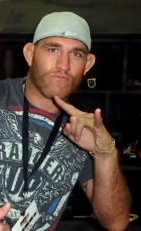
- The 2020 winner Tom Lawlor
- Venue: GILT Nightclub
- Location: Orlando, Florida
- Start date: November 25, 2020
- End date: December 23, 2020
- Competitors: A. C. H.; Daga (alternate); Davey Boy Smith Jr.; Dominic Garrini (alternate); El Hijo de L.A. Park (alternate); Gino Medina (alternate); Jordan Oliver (alternate); King Mo Lawal (alternate); Laredo Kid; Low Ki; Richard Holliday; Rocky Romero; TJP

Champion
- Tom Lawlor

Opera Cup (2020) was a professional wrestling tournament produced by Major League Wrestling (MLW), which took place at the GILT Nightclub in Orlando, Florida. It was the second edition of the MLW Opera Cup. The event was featured in episodes of Fusion that aired between November 25 and December 23, 2020 on Fubo Sports Network and MLW's YouTube channel.

== Production ==
=== Background ===
Opera House Cup was annually held as a professional wrestling tournament for nearly fifty years in various cities in the United States until 1948, when Stu Hart won the tournament and it was discontinued. Hart kept the possession of the Opera Cup trophy since then. On July 21, 2019, Major League Wrestling announced that it would be holding an event on December 5 at the Melrose Ballroom in Queens, New York City, New York which would be a set of television tapings of MLW's television program Fusion. On July 24, it was reported that Stu Hart's grandson and MLW wrestler Teddy Hart would be donating an inherited "family heirloom" to MLW. On July 30, MLW.com announced that the family heirloom was Stu Hart's Opera Cup trophy and MLW would be bringing back the Opera Cup tournament on the December 5 supercard, naming it Opera Cup.

On December 19, 2019, it was announced on MLW's website that the tournament would be resumed in 2020. On November 19, 2020, it was announced that the 2020 edition of Opera Cup tournament would begin on the November 25 episode of Fusion and all the eight participants of the tournament were announced, with Gino Medina, Dominic Garrini, Jordan Oliver, El Hijo de L.A. Park, King Mo Lawal, and Lucha Libre AAA Worldwide wrestler Daga named as the alternate participants in the Opera Cup.

=== Storylines ===
The card consisted of matches that resulted from scripted storylines, where wrestlers portrayed villains, heroes, or less distinguishable characters in scripted events that built tension and culminated in a wrestling match or series of matches, with results predetermined by MLW's writers. Storylines were played out on MLW's television program Fusion.

Quarter-finals

On November 19, the brackets of the Opera Cup tournament were revealed by MLW and the participants from the MLW roster were A. C. H., Low Ki, Richard Holliday, TJP, Tom Lawlor and previous year's tournament winner Davey Boy Smith Jr. Guest entrants included Lucha Libre AAA Worldwide representative Laredo Kid and New Japan Pro-Wrestling representative Rocky Romero. The first two matches of the opening round were scheduled to take on the November 25 episode of Fusion pitting Lawlor against Romero and TJP against Holliday. The second two matches of the opening round were set to take place on the December 2 episode of Fusion, with the first match pitting Kid against ACH and the second match pitting Ki against Smith, a rematch from the previous year's Opera Cup.

Semi-final

ACH, Low Ki, Richard Holliday and Tom Lawlor won their respective tournament matches and advanced to the semi-final round. The first semi-final match was set up between Ki and Holliday to take place on the December 9 episode of Fusion and the second semi-final between Lawlor and ACH was set to take place on the December 16 episode of Fusion.

Final

Low Ki and Tom Lawlor won their respective matches in the semi-final round, thus setting up the tournament final of the Opera Cup between Ki and Lawlor on the December 23 episode of Fusion, won by Lawlor.

== Results ==
Quarter-final (November 25)
No.	Results	Stipulations	Times
1	Richard Holliday defeated TJP (with Bu Ku Dao)	Singles match	10:25
2	Tom Lawlor (with Dominic Garrini) defeated Rocky Romero	Singles match	17:43

Quarter-final (December 2)
No.	Results	Stipulations	Times
1	A. C. H. defeated Laredo Kid	Singles match	14:08
2	Low Ki defeated Davey Boy Smith Jr.	Singles match	20:13

Semi-final (December 9)
No.	Results	Stipulations	Times
1	Low Ki defeated Richard Holliday	Singles match	9:24

Semi-final (December 16)
No.	Results	Stipulations	Times
1	Tom Lawlor (with Dominic Garrini and Kevin Ku) defeated A. C. H.	Singles match	12:29

Final (December 23)
No.	Results	Stipulations	Times
1	Tom Lawlor (with Dominic Garrini and Kevin Ku) defeated Low Ki (with Marshall and Ross Von Erich)	Singles match	24:41

== Tournament brackets ==
The brackets of the Opera Cup were revealed by MLW on November 19, 2020.

Quarterfinals
Fusion	Tom Lawlor	Pin
11/25	Rocky Romero	17:43
Fusion	Laredo Kid	Pin
12/2	A. C. H.	14:08
Fusion	Low Ki	Pin
12/2	Davey Boy Smith Jr.	20:13
Fusion	Richard Holliday	Pin
11/25	TJP	10:25

Semifinals
Fusion	Tom Lawlor	Pin
12/16	ACH	12:29
Fusion	Low Ki	Pin
12/9	Richard Holliday	9:19

Final
Fusion	Tom Lawlor	Pin
12/23	Low Ki	24:41
