= MLW Underground TV =

- MLW Underground TV logo
- Genre: Professional wrestling
- Created by: Court Bauer
- Starring: See Major League Wrestling roster
- Country of origin: United States
- No. of episodes: 34

Production
- Camera setup: Multiple-camera setup
- Running time: 60 minutes

Original release
- Network: Sunshine Network
- Release: April 7, 2003 – February 14, 2004

Related
- MLW Fusion (2018); MLW Fusion: Alpha (2021); MLW Azteca (2022); MLW Underground Wrestling (2023)

MLW Underground TV is a professional wrestling television series that was produced by Major League Wrestling (MLW) from 2003 to 2004. The series was hosted by former Extreme Championship Wrestling (ECW) commentator Joey Styles.

Reruns of the series began airing in the summer of 2020 on BeIN Sports USA.

The Underground name was revived for the weekly series titled MLW Underground Wrestling, that premiered on February 7, 2023.

== History ==
Underground TV episodes consisted of pre-taped matches from prior MLW events.

In late 2003, MLW released episodes of Underground TV on DVD. Unlike the on-air broadcast, the DVDs contain full-length matches from the television tapings. It also contained backstage interviews from before and after the event.

== See also ==
- List of professional wrestling television series
