= Battle Riot I =

2018 professional wresting event in New York City

- Promotion: Major League Wrestling
- Date: July 19, 2018 (aired July 27, 2018)
- City: New York City, New York
- Venue: Melrose Ballroom
- Attendance: 1,000

Event chronology
← Previous; Intimidation Games	Next → WarGames

Battle Riot chronology
← Previous; First	Next → II

MLW Fusion special episodes chronology
← Previous; First	Next → WarGames

Battle Riot (sequentially known as Battle Riot I) was a professional wrestling event produced by Major League Wrestling (MLW) that took place on July 19, 2018 at the Melrose Ballroom in New York City, New York. The event aired as a special episode of MLW's television program, Fusion, on July 27 on beIN Sports. It was the first event under the Battle Riot chronology.

Eleven matches took place at the event with three matches airing at the Battle Riot special on July 27 while other matches were taped for future episodes of Fusion. The main event was the first-ever 40-man Battle Riot match, with the winner earning a future title shot for the World Heavyweight Championship. Tom Lawlor won the match. The event also featured a match between Maxwell Jacob Friedman and Joey Ryan to determine the inaugural World Middleweight Championship.

== Production ==
=== Background ===
In July 2017, Major League Wrestling resumed promoting events for the first time since the promotion's original closure in 2004. The success of these events lead MLW to secure a television deal with beIN Sports for a new program, MLW Fusion, which debuted on April 20, 2018.

On May 7, 2018, MLW announced that it would hold an event at the Melrose Ballroom in New York, New York on July 19 which would be a television taping of Fusion, marking the return of MLW to New York after 2002. On May 31, MLW announced that the first-ever 40-man Battle Riot match would take place. The eponymous Battle Riot match is based on WWE's Royal Rumble match, where 40 participants participate and a new participant enters the match at every 60 seconds. Eliminations occur by pinfall, submission or being thrown over the top rope. The winner will be awarded a MLW World Heavyweight Championship opportunity at any place and time of his choosing. It was announced that Battle Riot would air as MLW's first two-hour television special on July 27 on beIN Sports.

=== Storylines ===
The card consisted of matches that resulted from scripted storylines, where wrestlers portrayed villains, heroes, or less distinguishable characters in scripted events that built tension and culminated in a wrestling match or series of matches, with results predetermined by MLW's writers. Storylines were played out on MLW's television program Fusion.

On June 12, MLW announced that the first-ever Battle Riot match would take place at the namesake event on July 19 and John Hennigan, Kevin Sullivan, A. C. H. and Davey Boy Smith were announced as the first four participants of the match. In the upcoming weeks, more participants were added into the match including Pentagon, Jr., Barrington Hughes, Jake Hager, Jimmy Yuta, PCO, Lance Anoa'i, Swoggle, Konnan, Sami Callihan, Joey Ryan, Jason Cade, Tom Lawlor, Jimmy Havoc, Brody King, Low Ki, Headshrinker Samu, Rey Fenix, Maxwell Jacob Friedman, Homicide, Simon Gotch, Vandal Ortagun, Leo Brien and Michael Patrick.

On June 28, MLW announced that the first-ever World Middleweight Champion would be crowned in a match between Maxwell Jacob Friedman and Joey Ryan at Battle Riot.

On July 16, MLW announced that Myron Reed would be making his MLW debut at Battle Riot against Kotto Brazil.

== Event ==
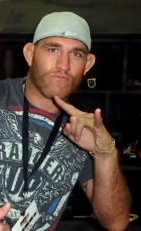
Tom Lawlor was the winner of the inaugural Battle Riot match.

The first match that aired at Battle Riot took place between Kotto Brazil and Myron Reed. Brazil executed a running backflip three-quarter facelock inverted DDT for the win.

Next, Maxwell Jacob Friedman and Joey Ryan competed in a match for the new MLW World Middleweight Championship. MJF poked Ryan in the eyes and nailed a shoulderbreaker to win the match and become the inaugural World Middleweight Champion.

The main event was the inaugural 40-man Battle Riot match, where eliminations would occur by pinfall, submission or tossing the competitor over the top rope and the winner would be earning a future MLW World Heavyweight Championship opportunity. Pentagon, Jr. and Rey Fenix competed as the first two entrants of the match. Jimmy Havoc entered the match last at #40. Tom Lawlor (#5), Sami Callihan (#30), Jake Hager (#38) and John Hennigan (#40) were the last four participants. Lawlor choked out Callihan to eliminate him and Hager tossed Morrison over the top rope which led to Lawlor and Hager becoming the final two participants of the match. Lawlor eliminated Hager by tossing him over the top rope to win the Battle Riot.

== Aftermath ==
The feud between Team Filthy and Stud Stable which had begun before Battle Riot escalated due to Tom Lawlor's elimination of Jake Hager to win the Battle Riot. Hager defeated Team Filthy member Simon Gotch on the August 3 episode of Fusion. On the August 17 episode of Fusion, Lawlor challenged Hager to a match in the Jungle MMA Gym but Stud Stable manager Col. Robert Parker instead put Parrow in the match, whom Lawlor defeated. On the August 31 episode of Fusion, Lawlor defeated Hager to end the feud. As a result of winning the Battle Riot, Lawlor announced on the October 19 episode of Fusion that he would cash in for his World Heavyweight Championship title shot against Low Ki at SuperFight on February 2, 2019, which Lawlor would win.

The feud between MJF and Joey Ryan continued after Battle Riot as the team of MJF and Aria Blake defeated Ryan and the debuting Taya Valkyrie in a mixed tag team match on the September 21 episode of Fusion.

== Results ==
No.	Results	Stipulations
1^{FT}	Fred Yehi defeated Richard Holliday	Singles match
2	Kotto Brazil defeated Myron Reed	Singles match
3^{FT}	Jake Hager (with Col. Robert Parker and The Dirty Blondes) defeated Simon Gotch (with Fred Yehi and Tom Lawlor)	Singles match
4^{FT}	Jimmy Havoc defeated Brody King	Singles match
5^{FT}	Lucha Brothers (Pentagón Jr. and Rey Fenix) (c) defeated Drago and Rey Horus	Tag team match for the MLW World Tag Team Championship
6^{FT}	PCO defeated Homicide	Singles match
7	Maxwell Jacob Friedman defeated Joey Ryan	Singles match for the vacant MLW World Middleweight Championship
8^{FT}	Sami Callihan (with The Death Machines) defeated Shane Strickland	Singles match
9^{FT}	Davey Boy Smith Jr. and Teddy Hart (with Brian Pillman Jr.) defeated A. C. H. and Rich Swann	Tag team match
10^{FT}	Low Ki (c) defeated John Hennigan	Singles match for the MLW World Heavyweight Championship
11	Tom Lawlor won by last eliminating Jake Hager	40-man Battle Riot match for a future MLW World Heavyweight Championship match
(c) / – the champion(s) heading into the match; FT / – the match was taped for a future broadcast of Fusion

=== Battle Riot match entrances and eliminations ===
Draw	Entrant	Order	Eliminated by	Method of elimination	Elimination(s)
1	Pentagon Jr.	11	Fallah Bahh	Over the top rope	1
2	Rey Fenix	10	Fallah Bahh	Over the top rope	2
3	Brody King	1	Tom Lawlor	Submission	0
4	Kenny Doane	6	Barrington Hughes	Pinfall	0
5	Tom Lawlor	–	Winner	–	10
6	Lance Anoa'i	7	Barrington Hughes	Pinfall	1
7	Rey Horus	13	Barrington Hughes	Over the top rope	0
8	Kevin Sullivan	2	Tom Lawlor	Submission	0
9	Fallah Bahh	9	Pentagon Jr. and Rey Fenix	Over the top rope	2
10	Swoggle	5	Tom Lawlor	Submission	0
11	Headshrinker Samu	3	Lance Anoa'i	Over the top rope	0
12	A. C. H.	4	Rey Fenix	Pinfall	0
13	Konnan	8	Barrington Hughes	Pinfall	0
14	Barrington Hughes	18	Jason Cade, Jimmy Yuta and Richard Holliday	Over the top rope	8
15	Jimmy Yuta	15	Barrington Hughes	Over the top rope	1
16	Kotto Brazil	12	Tom Lawlor	Pinfall	1
17	Richard Holliday	17	Barrington Hughes	Over the top rope	1
18	Fred Yehi	16	Barrington Hughes	Over the top rope	0
19	Jason Cade	14	Barrington Hughes	Over the top rope	1
20	Teddy Hart	19	Himself	Over the top rope	0
21	Vandal Ortagun	20	Tom Lawlor	Submission	0
22	Mikey Mondo	21	Tom Lawlor	Submission	0
23	PCO	24	Tom Lawlor and Simon Gotch	Over the top rope	0
24	L.A. Smooth	22	PCO	Over the top rope	0
25	Simon Gotch	31	Jake Hager	Over the top rope	2
26	Homicide	25	Sami Callihan and Michael Patrick	Over the top rope	1
27	Davey Boy Smith Jr.	26	Sawyer Fulton and Leon Scott	Over the top rope	0
28	The Blue Meanie	23	Homicide	Over the top rope	0
29	Michael Patrick	30	John Hennigan	Over the top rope	1
30	Sami Callihan	37	Tom Lawlor	Over the top rope	2
31	Sawyer Fulton	34	John Hennigan	Pinfall	1
32	Shane Strickland	36	Sami Callihan	Over the top rope	2
33	Leon Scott	29	Jake Hager	Over the top rope	1
34	Drago	32	Jimmy Havoc	Over the top rope	0
35	Leo Bryan	33	Shane Strickland	Over the top rope	0
36	Joey Ryan	28	Simon Gotch	Over the top rope	0
37	Maxwell Jacob Friedman	27	Tom Lawlor	Over the top rope	0
38	Jake Hager	39	Tom Lawlor	Over the top rope	3
39	John Hennigan	38	Jake Hager	Over the top rope	1
40	Jimmy Havoc	35	Shane Strickland	Over the top rope	1
