= Battle Riot =

Major League Wrestling match type

- Promotions: Major League Wrestling
- First event: Battle Riot I
- Signature matches: Battle Riot match

Battle Riot is an annual professional wrestling event produced by Major League Wrestling (MLW). The inaugural event took place on July 19, 2018.

The event is named after the Battle Riot match, a multi-competitor match type in which wrestlers are eliminated until one is left and declared winner. The match begins with two participants in the ring. Another fighter then enters every minute until 40 wrestlers have joined the match. Competitors are eliminated by either pin, submission, or going over the top rope and having both feet touch the venue floor. The declared winner of the Battle Riot match receives a future title shot for the MLW World Heavyweight Championship.

The first two, fourth, and eighth events served as television tapings for MLW Fusion. The first and second events were broadcast as special episodes of Fusion, with the second event airing live on Bein Sports USA.

The third, fourth, sixth, seventh, and eighth events have been presented as standalone specials, equivalent to a pay-per-view; with matches from the third event also being taped for the MLW Fusion: Alpha miniseries. The fifth event was a television taping for MLW Underground Wrestling on Reelz, and aired as a special episode on April 25, 2023; it would be the show's penultimate episode before its cancellation. A "Special Edition" of the telecast was streamed on May 18 for FITE+ subscribers as part of MLW's partnership with the streamer.

== Dates, venues and winners ==
Aired Live

#	Event	Date	City	Venue	Main event	Winner	Entry No.
1	Battle Riot I	July 19, 2018	Queens, New York	Melrose Ballroom	40-man Battle Riot match	Tom Lawlor	5
2	Battle Riot II	April 5, 2019	Queens, New York	Melrose Ballroom	40-man Battle Riot match	LA Park	29
3	Battle Riot III	July 10, 2021	Philadelphia, Pennsylvania	2300 Arena	41-man Battle Riot match	Alexander Hammerstone	35
4	Battle Riot IV	June 23, 2022	Queens, New York	Melrose Ballroom	40-man Battle Riot match	Jacob Fatu	28
5	Battle Riot V	April 8, 2023	Philadelphia, Pennsylvania	2300 Arena	40-man Battle Riot match	Alex Kane	1
6	Battle Riot VI	June 1, 2024	Atlanta, Georgia	Center Stage	40-man Battle Riot match	Matt Riddle	31
7	Battle Riot VII	April 5, 2025	Long Beach, California	Thunder Studios Arena	40-man Battle Riot match for the MLW World Heavyweight Championship	Matt Riddle	25
8	Battle Riot VIII	January 29, 2026	Kissimmee, Florida	Osceola Heritage Park Events Center	40-man Battle Riot match for the MLW World Heavyweight Championship	Killer Kross	1

=== Championship match for winner ===
– Championship victory
– Championship match loss

	Winner	Event	Year	Championship match
1	Tom Lawlor	SuperFight	2018	Lawlor defeated Low Ki for the MLW World Heavyweight Championship.
2	L. A. Park	Saturday Night SuperFight	2019	Park lost to Jacob Fatu for the MLW World Heavyweight Championship.
3	Alexander Hammerstone	Fightland	2021	Hammerstone defeated Jacob Fatu for MLW World Heavyweight Championship in a title vs. title match also for Hammerstone's MLW National Openweight Championship.
4	Jacob Fatu	SuperFight	2022	Fatu lost to Alexander Hammerstone for the MLW World Heavyweight Championship.
5	Alex Kane	Never Say Never	2023	Kane defeated Alexander Hammerstone for the MLW World Heavyweight Championship.
6	Matt Riddle	Kings of Colosseum	2024	Riddle defeated Satoshi Kojima for the MLW World Heavyweight Championship
