= Melrose Ballroom =

Concert venue in New York City

- Interactive map of Melrose Ballroom
- Location: 36-08 33rd Street, Long Island City, New York, US
- Coordinates: 40.7556°N 73.9286°W
- Capacity: 1,100

Construction
- Opened: December 2013

Website
- melroseballroom.com

The Melrose Ballroom is a 1,100-seat music venue located in the Long Island City neighborhood of Queens, New York City, United States.

== History ==
The venue held a soft opening in December 2013 with Nikos Makropoulos and Eleni Alexander being the first artists to play at the venue. On February 19, 2014, Queens Community Board 1 approved the venue's application for a cabaret license. The venue hosted its grand opening on September 19, 2014 with Greek singer Yiannis Ploutarhos playing to a sold-out crowd. In July 2019, Alan Kaufman, the former CEO of the Melrose Credit Union and Tony Georgiton were charged in a bribery scheme which he had been accepting bribes from Georgiton including an agreement for the Melrose Credit Union to purchase the naming rights to the venue and had provieded Kaufman with free housing in exchange for $60 million worth of loans and favorable rates for his companies. In September 2020, Georgiton pleaded guilty to one count of conspiracy. On January 11, 2021, he was sentenced to three-years' probation, a $95,000 fine, a $286,663.65 forfeiture, and a special condition of nine months’ home confinement.

== Notable events ==
- Steven Tyler – September 10, 2015
- MLW Battle Riot and MLW Fusion tapings – July 19, 2018
- Game Changer Wrestling (GCW) Joey Janela’s Lost In New York – August 17, 2018
- MLW Fury Road and MLW Fusion tapings – October 4, 2018
- Impact Wrestling Bound for Glory – October 14, 2018
- Michael Learns to Rock – November 2, 2019
- Lulu Santos Pra Sempre Tour – November 22, 2019
- MLW Battle Riot IV and MLW Fusion tapings – June 23, 2022
- MLW War Chamber – April 6, 2023
- Orange Crush Presents Superpower Slam – February 1, 2026
