= MLW Fusion =

American professional wrestling television program

- Logo used for MLW Fusion from 2021 to 2022 and from May 30, 2026 to the present day
- Genre: Professional wrestling
- Created by: Court Bauer
- Presented by: Joe Dombrowski (play-by-play commentator); Tom Lawlor (color commentator)
- Starring: MLW roster
- Country of origin: United States
- Original language: English
- No. of seasons: 7
- No. of episodes: 218 (as October 22, 2026)

Production
- Executive producers: Sean O'Heir; Nelson Sweglar
- Camera setup: Multicamera setup
- Running time: 60 minutes
- Production company: GPW Productions

Original release
- Network: beIN Sports USA (2018–2023; 2026); Fubo Sports Network (2020–2021); YouTube (2020–2022; 2023; 2026); Pro Wrestling TV (2022–2023); Tubi (2026–present)
- Release: April 20, 2018

Related
- MLW Underground TV (2003–2004); MLW Fusion: Alpha (2021); MLW Azteca (2022); MLW Underground Wrestling (2023)

MLW Fusion is an American professional wrestling streaming television program produced by Major League Wrestling (MLW) that premiered on April 20, 2018. Originally airing on beIN Sports USA, Fusion moved to MLW's YouTube channel in 2020; with beIN Sports now airing replays on Saturdays. From November 10, 2022, to February 2, 2023, the series would stream on Pro Wrestling TV.

A thirteen-part mini-series, titled MLW Fusion: Alpha (stylized as MLW Fusion: ALPHA), aired from September 22 to December 16, 2021. A second mini-series, MLW Azteca, aired from Thursday January 6 to February 3, 2022.

== History ==
=== 2018–2020 ===
Original logo; used from 2018 to May 2020, and from November 2022 to February 2023

Major League Wrestling announced their partnership with beIN Sports on March 30, 2018, in which the network would air a weekly television series. Subsequently, MLW announced their television tapings would take place at Gilt Nightclub in Orlando, Florida. MLW Fusion aired on Friday nights beginning on April 20, 2018. On September 19, MLW announced a deal for the show to be streamed through FITE TV, and to air on beIN Sports in Spanish.

On November 29, MLW announced that Fusion would be broadcast live for the first time on its December 14 episode, during MLW's Zero Hour event. Since then the company continued to air periodic live specials.

In January 2019, Fusion added its first international broadcast partner, EGO TV in Israel. In February 2019, MLW announced that Fusion would be moving from Friday to Saturday nights.

After the conclusion of the MLW vs AAA Super Series on the May 9, 2020, episode, Fusion went on a hiatus due to the COVID-19 pandemic. A spinoff series, titled Pulp Fusion, was uploaded weekly on MLW's YouTube channel in the interim beginning on May 29, 2020.

=== "The Restart", Fusion: Alpha, and Azteca (2020–2022) ===
Second Logo; used from November 2020 to May 2021. Variations of this logo were used for Fusion: Alpha in 2021, and from May 25, 2023, to December 14, 2023.

On September 10, MLW announced that Fusion would move to Wednesday nights on fubo Sports Network. On October 10, they revealed Fusion would return on November 18 at 7pm EST and new episodes would also premiere on MLW's YouTube channel on the same night. With the move to YouTube and Fubo Sports, Fusion abandoned its original year-round, weekly format; a special "season finale" aired on May 5, 2021.

During the premiere of Battle Riot III on July 24, 2021, MLW announced a new season of Fusion to air on "a new home" in the Fall, and a new, four-part mini-series titled MLW Fusion: Alpha (stylized as MLW Fusion: ALPHA) to lead into the new season. Initially intended to air in August, Fusion: Alpha was later re-announced on September 6, 2021, as "a new season and series from MLW" to premiere on September 22 on MLW's YouTube channel, and would also air on Saturdays and Mondays on Bein Sports. Beginning October 19, 2021, Fusion: Alpha also streamed on FITE TV.

On December 7, MLW announced that the series finale of Fusion: Alpha would air on December 15, 2021, though the final episode would instead air on December 16. MLW also announced a new "anthology mini-series" titled MLW Azteca, which was taped during the MLW Azteca/The Crash show in December 2021. The series premiered on Thursday January 6, 2022, on MLW's YouTube channel and FITE TV, and aired for five episodes.

=== 2022–2023 ===
During the January 27, 2022, episode of MLW Azteca, MLW announced that Fusion would return for a new season on February 10. On the June 23 episode, they announced that the current season would end with the Kings of Colosseum special on July 14, 2022. During the finale, MLW announced that Fusion would return for a new season in the Fall.

On October 11, 2022, MLW announced a partnership with streaming platform Pro Wrestling TV (PWTV), bringing the promotion's programming library to the service beginning November 3. The new season of Fusion premiered on PWTV on November 10. On January 20, 2023, MLW announced a broadcast deal with U.S. cable channel Reelz to produce a new flagship show titled MLW Underground Wrestling, which premiered on February 7 and featured matches and segments that were originally taped for Fusion. Following its premiere, BeIN Sports ceased airing Fusion, and the show's February 9, 2023, episode was postponed.

On the April 11 episode of Underground Wrestling, MLW announced that Fusion would return and feature the 2023 Super Series. On May 11, MLW's website revealed that the new season of Fusion would premiere on Bein Sports and Bein Sports Xtra in the U.S. and Canada, on Friday, May 26. The following day, MLW announced that the season would air first on the MLW YouTube channel, beginning on Thursday, May 25. On May 16, 2023, they announced that Fusion would also be included with a FITE+ subscription, as part of a larger partnership between MLW and FITE announced on May 2. MLW announced on May 24, 2023, that MLW Fusion would return to BeIN Sports on June 16; airing Fridays on BeIN Sports Xtra, and Saturdays on Bein Sports in the U.S. and Canada. Fusion instead returned to BeIN Sports on Saturday June 24, 2023.

Following the 2023 Fusion season finale, MLW revamped their event schedule to air two events every month; a live, premium event for Triller TV+ subscribers, and a free, taped special for BeIN Sports and MLW's YouTube channel.

=== 2026–present ===
During MLW x Don Gato Tequila: Lucha de los Muertos on November 20, 2025, it was announced that Fusion would return in 2026.

In May 2026, it was announced the new season of Fusion would premiere on Saturday May 30, with new episodes streaming at 6:05pm EST on YouTube. On May 26, MLW announced a partnership with Live Nation Entertainment to also stream Fusion on Veeps.

On September 17, 2026, MLW announced that they had signed a distribution deal with Fox Corporation's Tubi to premiere new episodes of Fusion on the service beginning that night at 8:00pm EST. Reruns of Fusion previously aired on Tubi via Bein Sports Xtra's FAST channel in 2022.

== Production ==
=== Filming locations ===
Initially, Fusion had been taped at Gilt Nightclub in Orlando, Florida. In May 2018, MLW announced they would be holding television tapings at the Melrose Ballroom in New York City, New York on July 19, marking the first time tapings were held outside the state of Florida. Subsequent tapings have been held at various venues around the United States.

From Fall 2020 until 2021, due to the COVID-19 pandemic, MLW returned to Gilt Nightclub to tape their programming behind closed doors. From July to December 2021, MLW programming was taped at the 2300 Arena from the promotion's home base in Philadelphia, Pennsylvania.

=== Special episodes ===
Episode	Date	Notes
beIN Sports USA (2018–2020)
Battle Riot	July 27, 2018	Featured the first ever Battle Riot match
WarGames	September 14, 2018	Featured the WarGames match
Fright Night	October 26, 2018	Featured the first "Spin the Wheel, Make the Deal" match
MLW Fusion Live	December 14, 2018	First ever live broadcast
Christmas Day Special	December 25, 2018	Featured PCO and Brody King's last match in MLW. The special wasn't included in the series' official episode count.
SuperFight	February 2, 2019	Special live broadcast
Intimidation Games	March 2, 2019	Special live broadcast
MLW Fusion presented by Salina de la Renta	May 4, 2019	First Fusion episode hosted by Salina de la Renta.
Battle Riot II	April 5, 2019	Special live broadcast featuring the Battle Riot match
Fury Road	June 1, 2019	Special live broadcast
MLW Fusion presented by Salina de la Renta	June 15, 2019	Second Fusion episode hosted by Salina de la Renta.
Kings of Colosseum	July 6, 2019	Special live broadcast
War Chamber	September 14, 2019	Featured the War Chamber match
Jimmy Havoc's Slaughterhouse	October 19, 2019	Fusion episode hosted by Jimmy Havoc.
"Saturday Night SuperFight" pre-show	November 2, 2019	The live pre-show to MLW Saturday Night SuperFight
MLW Fusion on Thanksgiving	November 28, 2019	Featured Jacob Fatu vs Ross Von Erich for the MLW World Heavyweight Championship
Opera Cup opening round	December 14, 2019	The beginning of the 2019 Opera Cup.
MLW Fusion presented by The Dynasty	February 15, 2020	Fusion episode hosted by The Dynasty.
Fusion 100	March 7, 2020	The 100th episode of MLW Fusion
AAA vs MLW	April 18, 2020	The beginning of the Super Series with Lucha Libre AAA Worldwide.
Fubo Sports Network / YouTube (2020–2021)
The Restart	November 18, 2020	The return of Fusion after a hiatus due to the COVID-19 pandemic.
Opera Cup opening round	November 25, 2020	The beginning of the 2020 Opera Cup.
Kings of Colosseum	January 6, 2021	Special broadcast
Salina de la Renta's MLW Fusion	January 13, 2021	Third Fusion episode hosted by Salina de la Renta.
Filthy Island	February 17, 2021	Special episode of Fusion held in Hawaii at Tom Lawlor's Filthy Island.
Never Say Never	March 31, 2021	Special broadcast
Season Finale	May 5, 2021	Features the first appearance of Azteca Underground's Cesar Duran.
Fusion: Alpha
Opera Cup opening round	October 13, 2021	The beginning of the 2021 Opera Cup.
War Chamber	November 17, 2021	Special broadcast
MLW Fusion on Thanksgiving 2021	November 25, 2021	Featured the ladder match for the vacant MLW National Openweight Championship
YouTube (2022)
Season Premiere	February 10, 2022	Featured Alexander Hammerstone vs Pagano in a Falls Count Anywhere match for the MLW World Heavyweight Championship.
SuperFight	March 10, 2022	Special broadcast
Intimidation Games	April 28, 2022	Special broadcast
Rise of the Renegades	June 9, 2022	Special broadcast; matches were taped at MLW Azteca Underground on April 1, 2022.
Kings of Colosseum	July 14, 2022	Season Finale
Pro Wrestling TV (2022–2023)
Season Premiere	November 10, 2022	Featured Myron Reed vs. La Estrella vs. Lince Dorado vs. Arez for the MLW World Middleweight Championship. The first episode of Fusion to air on Pro Wrestling TV
MLW Fusion on Thanksgiving 2022	November 24, 2022	Featured Alexander Hammerstone vs Richard Holliday in a Falls Count Anywhere match for the MLW World Heavyweight Championship
YouTube (2023–2026)
Season Premiere	May 25, 2023	Start of the 2023 Super Series in Tijuana, Mexico.
Salina de la Renta's MLW Fusion	October 26, 2023	Fourth Fusion episode hosted by Salina de la Renta.
MLW Fusion on Thanksgiving 2023	November 23, 2023	Fourth Fusion Thanksgiving special
Season Finale	December 14, 2023	Featured Rickey Shane Page vs Akira for the MLW National Openweight Championship
Two-hour season premiere	May 30, 2026	Episodes 195 and 196
MLW Fusion 200	June 20, 2026	Episodes 199 and 200
4th of July Special	July 4, 2026	Featured the Bunkhouse Stampede to crown the inaugural MLW Southern Crown Championship
Fantastica Mania USA	July 18, 2026	The beginning of Fantastica Mania USA
Blood and Thunder	August 8, 2026	Featured Killer Kross (c) vs. Satoshi Kojima for the MLW World Heavyweight Championship. Matches taped at Fantastica Mania USA
Kings of Colosseum	September 5, 2026	Killer Kross (c) vs. Josh Bishop in a No Holds Barred match for the MLW World Heavyweight Championship
Tubi (2026–present)
2026 Opera Cup Opening Rounds	September 17, 2026	The debut of Fusion on Tubi, and the beginning of the 2026 Opera Cup.
Fightland	September 24, 2018	Special broadcast

== Roster ==
The wrestlers featured on Major League Wrestling take part in scripted feuds and storylines. Wrestlers are portrayed as either villains or heroes in the scripted events that build tension and culminate in a wrestling match.

=== Commentators ===
Commentators	Dates
Tony Schiavone and Rich Bocchini	January 11, 2018 – July 19, 2018; August 3, 2019 – October 7, 2019
Tony Schiavone and Rich Bocchini/Matt Striker	July 19, 2018 – February 23, 2019
Rich Bocchini and Jim Cornette	March 2, 2019 – July 27, 2019
Rich Bocchini and A.J. Kirsch	October 14, 2019 – May 23, 2020
Rich Bocchini and Saint Laurent	November 18, 2020 – March 24, 2021; September 22, 2021 – October 6, 2021; October 20, 2021
Ray Flores and Saint Laurent	March 31, 2021 – May 5, 2021
Rich Bocchini and Joe Dombrowski	October 13, 2021 – January 5, 2023
Joe Dombrowski and Matt Striker	January 12, 2023 – February 2, 2023; June 8, 2023 – December 14, 2023
Joe Dombrowski and Christian Cole	May 25, 2023 – June 1, 2023
Joe Dombrowski and Tom Lawlor	May 30, 2026 – present

== Broadcast history ==
MLW Fusion originally aired on Friday nights in the United States on BeIN Sports. In February 2019, the show moved to Saturday nights.

On November 18, 2020, new episodes of Fusion moved to Wednesday nights on fubo Sports Network and MLW's YouTube channel, with BeIN Sports now airing replays on Saturday nights.

With the premiere of MLW Azteca on January 6, 2022, MLW programming moved to Thursdays nights on YouTube; Fusion would return on February 10 of that year.

On November 10, 2022, MLW Fusion moved to Pro Wrestling TV, continuing to air on Thursday nights.

On May 25, 2023, Fusion returned to MLW's YouTube channel, and also began airing on FITE for FITE+ subscribers.

On September 17, 2026, MLW Fusion moved to Tubi, returned to air on Thursday nights.

Channel	Time slot	Years
BeIN Sports USA	Friday 8:00pm	April 20, 2018 - February 2019
BeIN Sports USA	Saturday 9:00pm	February 2019 – May 2020
BeIN Sports USA	Saturday 10:00pm	May 30, 2026 – September 12, 2026
Fubo Sports Network	Wednesday 7:00pm	November 18, 2020 – May 5, 2021
YouTube	Wednesday 7:00pm	November 18, 2020 – May 5, 2021
YouTube	Thursday 8:00pm	February 10, 2022 – July 14, 2022
YouTube	Thursday 8:00pm	May 25, 2023 – December 14, 2023
YouTube	Saturday 6:05pm	May 30, 2026 – September 12, 2026
Pro Wrestling TV	Thursday 8:00pm	November 10, 2022 – February 2, 2023
Tubi	Thursday 8:00pm	September 17, 2026 – present

=== International ===
In addition to the U.S., MLW Fusion also airs on BeIN Sports in Canada and Puerto Rico. As of 2022, Fusion is currently carried by StarTimes and Wataaa Fight Channel outside of North America, Fight Klub Poland, and MBC in Mauritius.

On July 5, 2022, MLW announced a new broadcast deal with Ayozat TV in the United Kingdom.

== See also ==
- List of professional wrestling television series
