= Tom Lawlor =

American mixed martial arts fighter (born 1983)

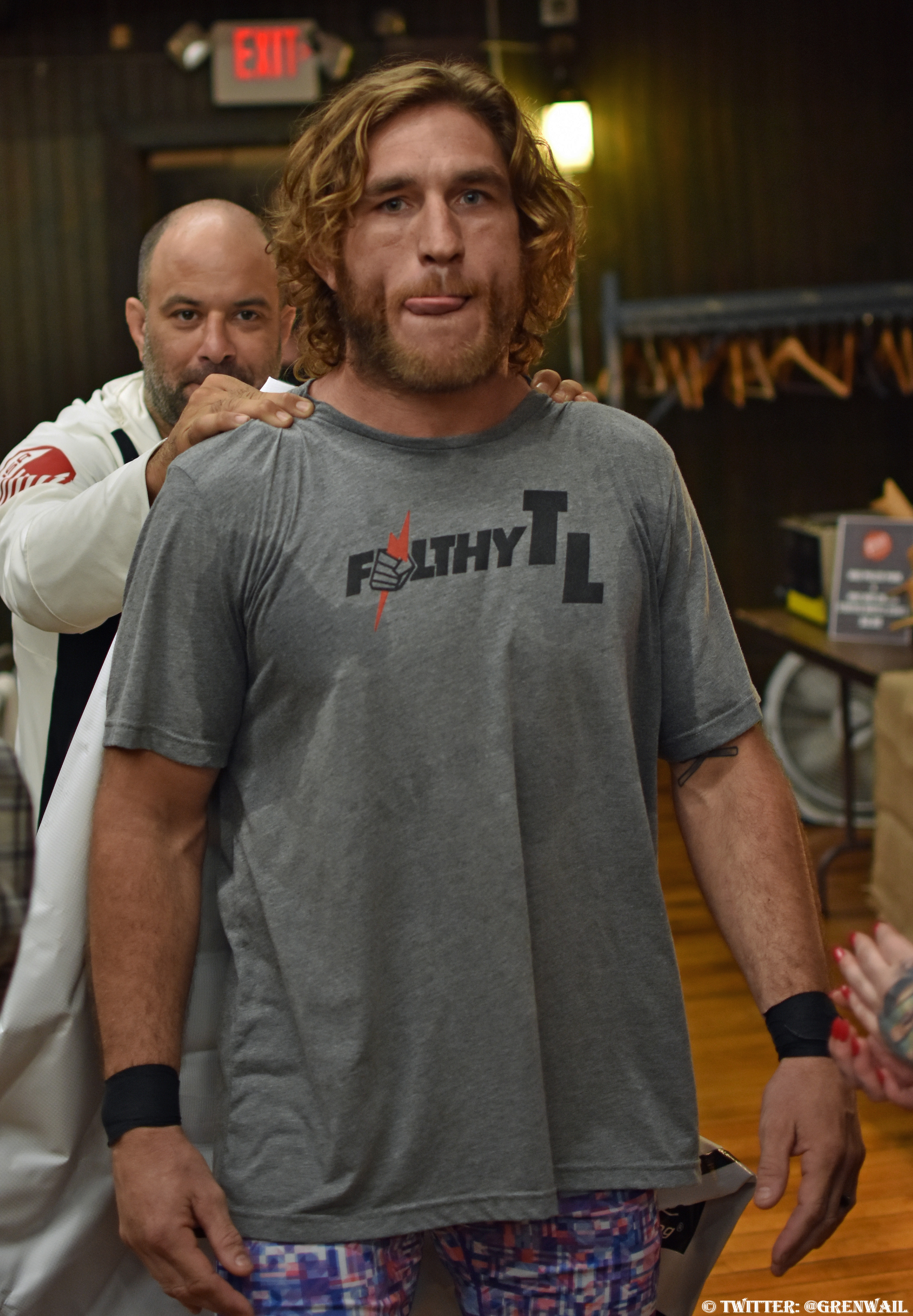
- Lawlor in 2019
- Born: Thomas Joseph Lawlor; May 15, 1983 (age 43); Fall River, Massachusetts, U.S.
- Other names: Filthy
- Height: 6 ft 0 in (1.83 m)
- Weight: 205 lb (93 kg; 14.6 st)
- Division: Middleweight; Light heavyweight
- Reach: 75 in (191 cm)
- Stance: Southpaw
- Fighting out of: Las Vegas, Nevada
- Team: Syndicate MMA
- Rank: Black belt in Brazilian Jiu-Jitsu under Tim Burrill
- Wrestling: NCWA Wrestling
- Years active: 2003 (amateur), 2007–2021

Mixed martial arts record
- Total: 20
- Wins: 11
- By knockout: 4
- By submission: 4
- By decision: 3
- Losses: 8
- By submission: 3
- By decision: 4
- By disqualification: 1
- No contests: 1

Amateur record
- Total: 1
- Wins: 1
- By knockout: 1
- Losses: 0

Other information
- Mixed martial arts record from Sherdog
- Professional wrestling career
- Ring name(s): Tom Lawlor "Filthy" Tom Lawlor
- Billed height: 6 ft 0 in (183 cm)
- Billed weight: 205 lb (93 kg)
- Trained by: AJ Gallant; Chasyn Rance; Hack Myers; Matt Bentley
- Debut: July 16, 2005

Thomas Joseph Lawlor (born May 15, 1983), better known by his ring name "Filthy" Tom Lawlor, is an American professional wrestler, color commentator, podcast host, and retired mixed martial artist. He is signed to Major League Wrestling (MLW), where he serves as a color commentator for its flagship show Fusion. He was in the Light Heavyweight division of the UFC.

A wrestler since 2007, he was a cast member of SpikeTV's The Ultimate Fighter: Team Nogueira vs. Team Mir.

== Early life ==
Lawlor was born in Fall River, Massachusetts before moving to Swansea, Massachusetts, and then finally to Fort Myers, Florida. He attended Estero High School in Florida and was on the wrestling team, then continued his wrestling career at the University of Central Florida where he won three NCWA national championships in the 235 lb weight class in 2003, 2004, 2005 and as a freshman placed third. He began Brazilian jiu-jitsu in his home town of Fall River. Lawlor had a sister who died in a car accident in 2001. He dedicated his UFC on Fuel TV 9 win to his late sister.

== Mixed martial arts ==
Lawlor previously lived in Providence, RI. He, along with TUF alumni and MMA veteran Seth Petruzelli and Brazilian jiu-jitsu Black Belt Mike Lee, was previously a part-owner and coach at The Jungle MMA – Orlando BJJ, MMA, Muay Thai The Jungle MMA and Fitness. He currently trains at Lauzon MMA and works with Team Aggression in Bridgewater, Massachusetts.

Lawlor has made himself known by imitating other fighters (Art Jimmerson, Dan Severn, Harold Howard, Genki Sudo, and Conor McGregor) during the weigh-ins and octagon entrances. These impersonations, along with his tongue-in-cheek ring entrance routines (paying homage to Hulk Hogan and Apollo Creed amongst others) have made Lawlor something of a cult figure among fans. In 2010, Lawlor announced his intention to tone down his pre-fight antics.

=== Amateur career ===
Before turning professional in 2007, Lawlor made his MMA debut as an amateur in 2003, facing Rich Mitchell at Xtreme Fighting 5 on July 26, 2003. He won via KO just under a minute into the fight, and would subsequently take time off from MMA.

=== The Ultimate Fighter ===
Lawlor appeared on the eighth season of The Ultimate Fighter. He submitted Ryan Lopez with a rear naked choke in the elimination round to earn his spot in the TUF house. He was chosen by Frank Mir to be a part of Team Mir.

He was selected to fight first against Ryan Bader and despite a good showing, Lawlor lost by knockout in the first round, due to a ground and pound punches.

=== Ultimate Fighting Championship ===
Lawlor won his UFC debut against former The Ultimate Fighter 8 castmate Kyle Kingsbury via unanimous decision. They fought on the preliminary card at The Ultimate Fighter 8 Finale. After the fight with Kingsbury, Lawlor moved down in weight after realizing he was too small for light heavyweight.

Lawlor had his second fight for the UFC, when he took on C. B. Dollaway at UFC 100. Tom won in an upset, putting Dollaway to sleep with a guillotine choke 55 seconds into the first round and was awarded Submission of the Night honors.

Lawlor fought Aaron Simpson on January 11, 2010, at UFC Fight Night 20. Lawlor showed off his improved striking skills in the first round by dominating Simpson, but lost a controversial split decision after gassing in the third round. However, the decision of the fight was met with widespread criticism toward the current scoring system in Mixed Martial Arts.

Lawlor was scheduled to face Tim Credeur on May 8, 2010, at UFC 113, but Credeur was forced off the card with an injury. Lawlor instead faced Joe Doerksen, losing via submission in the second round.

Lawlor earned a much needed victory over Patrick Cote on October 23, 2010, at UFC 121 in a performance that once again displayed Lawlor's superb wrestling and jiu jitsu skills by successfully executing five takedowns, threatening with submissions (nearly finishing Cote in the first round with an arm-triangle choke before Cote blatantly grabbed the fence to escape) in every round and showing his improved cardio as he easily cruised to a 30-27 unanimous decision victory.

Lawlor was expected to face Maiquel Falcão on August 27, 2011, at UFC 134 but Falcao was suddenly released from the promotion on May 11. Lawlor was expected to remain on the Brazilian card, but instead took a bout against Kyle Noke on August 14, 2011, at UFC on Versus 5. However, Lawlor pulled out of the fight in early July 2011.

Lawlor lost to Chris Weidman on November 19, 2011, at UFC 139 due to a D'Arce choke in 2:07 of the first round.

Lawlor faced Jason MacDonald on May 15, 2012, his birthday, at UFC on Fuel TV: Korean Zombie vs. Poirier. He won the fight via KO in the first round and earned Knockout of the Night for his efforts.

Lawlor fought Francis Carmont on November 17, 2012, at UFC 154. At the weigh in, Lawlor wore a mask resembling that of the professional wrestler the Shockmaster and deliberately tripped going through the curtain in an homage to the Shockmaster incident. Despite controlling the majority of the fight and threatening with several submissions, he lost the fight via a controversial split decision

Lawlor faced Michael Kuiper on April 6, 2013, at UFC on Fuel TV 9. After losing the first round, he rebounded and won via submission, a guillotine choke, early in the second round. During his post victory speech, Lawlor had dedicated his fight to his late sister; Katie.

Lawlor was expected to face Ilir Latifi in a light heavyweight bout on July 19, 2014, at UFC Fight Night 46. However, Lawlor was forced out of the bout due to injury, and was replaced by promotional newcomer Chris Dempsey.

After over two years away from active competition, Lawlor returned to face Gian Villante on July 25, 2015, at UFC on Fox 16. He won the fight via knockout in the second round and also earned a Performance of the Night bonus.

Lawlor was expected to face Fábio Maldonado on November 7, 2015, at UFC Fight Night 77. However, Lawlor was forced out of the bout with injury and replaced by Corey Anderson.

Lawlor faced Corey Anderson on March 5, 2016, at UFC 196. He lost the fight by unanimous decision.

On November 4, 2016, Lawlor was provisionally suspended from the UFC stemming from an out-of-competition drug test conducted by USADA on October 10, 2016. Lawlor revealed that he failed for Ostarine, although he denied knowing the cause of the failure. In February 2017, Lawlor was handed a two-year suspension. He became eligible to return to competition in October 2018.

On August 13, 2018, Tom Lawlor was released from UFC, less than two months before his suspension was lifted. At the time of his release, he held a record of 6–5 within the promotion.

=== Post-UFC career ===
On November 24, 2018, Lawlor faced Deron Winn at Golden Boy Promotions's inaugural MMA event. He lost the fight by unanimous decision.

==== Professional Fighters League ====
in March 2020, Lawlor signed with Professional Fighters League and is expected to participate in the PFL season 3 light heavyweight bracket.

Lawlor was set to face Jordan Johnson on April 29, 2021 at PFL 2 as the start of the 2021 PFL Light Heavyweight tournament. However, in March, it was announced that Johnson pulled out and was replaced by promotional newcomer Antônio Carlos Júnior. He lost the bout via guillotine choke in the first round.

Lawlor faced Jordan Young at PFL 5 on June 17, 2021. He won the bout via unanimous decision and then retired by placing his gloves down in the center of the mat after the win.

== Professional wrestling career ==
=== Early career (2005–2008) ===
Before the start of his MMA career, Lawlor worked three years as a professional wrestler on the Florida independent circuit, even taking part in a WWE tryout.

=== Independent circuit (2014–present) ===
On May 17, 2014, Lawlor made his Ring of Honor debut accompanying reDRagon as their manager against The Young Bucks in their match for the ROH World Tag Team Championship at the ROH and New Japan Pro-Wrestling co-promoted pay-per-view War of the Worlds. Lawlor returned to professional wrestling in February 2017, due to his suspension from UFC. On April 15, 2017, Lawlor debuted for Prestige Championship Wrestling competing against Davey Richards in the shows co-main event. Lawlor would lose the match but would go on to become a regular at Prestige shows. On May 5, 2017, Lawlor was advertised for Canadian promotion All Star Wrestling for their 7 July 2017 show. On May 26 and 27, Lawlor participated in the AIW JT Lightening Invitational Tournament. Day 1, he was set to face Jimmy Rave but Rave dropped out of the show due to travel issues. Instead, UFC Legend and former NWA World Champion Dan Severn answered Lawlor's challenge. Lawlor pinned Severn to advance. Day 2, Lawlor was in a Fatal Four-Way with Tracy Williams, Mike Tolar and Dominic Garrini. Williams would win the match and the tournament. He lost to Mike Bailey at C4 Fighting Back 7: Wrestling With Cancer in Ottawa, Ontario on August 12, 2017.

=== Major League Wrestling (2017–present) ===
Since their 2017 relaunch, Lawlor has competed in Major League Wrestling (MLW), and appears on their weekly MLW Fusion television series. Lawlor won the first Battle Riot in MLW in 2018. He won after eliminating Jake Hager, who he went on to feud with. He followed that up by beating Sami Callihan, Shane Strickland and his former partner Simon Gotch in singles matches.

On February 2, 2019, Lawlor won the MLW World Heavyweight Championship from Low Ki at MLW's live SuperFight event. He would hold the title 154 days, before losing it to Jacob Fatu at Kings of Colosseum in July 2019. He would also fail to defeat Fatu in a rematch for the title. On November 14, 2019, it was announced Lawlor left the promotion. However, on November 22, 2019 it was announced he had signed a new multi-year exclusive agreement with the company. Lawlor turned heel on the Thanksgiving episode of Fusion by attacking Ross Von Erich with a chair during his world title bout against Jacob Fatu.

At MLW Slaughterhouse, Lawlor joined forces with Matt Cardona and announced that he had signed with MLW and was part of the World Titan Federation. On February 29, 2024 at Intimidation Games, Lawlor and Davey Boy Smith Jr. defeated The Second Gear Crew (Matthew Justice and 1 Called Manders) to win the MLW World Tag Team Championship. However, they vacated the titles two months later.

=== New Japan Pro-Wrestling (2020–2025) ===
On the July 12, 2020 episode of Lion's Break Collision, Lawlor made his New Japan Pro-Wrestling debut, defeating Rocky Romero. Lawlor immediately aligned himself with J. R. Kratos and Taylor Rust, forming the NJPW version of Team Filthy. The group later added the West Coast Wrecking Crew (Jorel Nelson and Royce Isaacs) and Danny Limelight. After a loss against Jeff Cobb, Lawlor kicked Rust out of Team Filthy, replacing him with Chris Dickinson. However, Dickinson later aligned himself with Brody King at the ROH 19th Anniversary Show, causing tension amongst Team Filthy. Dickinson refused to commit to Team Filthy's violent actions on the following weeks episodes of NJPW Strong, further straining the groups relationship with Dickinson. In April 2021, Lawlor competed in the New Japan Cup USA tournament to crown the first ever NJPW Strong Openweight Champion. He defeated the DKC in a qualifying match, Ren Narita in the first round, Hikuleo in the semi-finals, and Brody King in the finals to win the New Japan Cup USA and become the first ever NJPW Strong Openweight Champion. Team Filthy and Dickinson's relationship finally ended when Dickinson challenged Lawlor for the title as his first challenger, causing Lawlor and Team Filthy to attack Dickinson, removing him from the faction.

In May 2021, Lawlor defeated Dickinson to retain his Strong Openweight Championship at Collision. Lawlor retained against Karl Fredericks at Ignition. Lawlor continued to retain the title against challengers such as Satoshi Kojima, Lio Rush and Ren Narita. At Detonation, Lawlor defeated Fred Rosser. He made further title defences against Taylor Rust and Clark Connors before losing the title to Rosser at Collision, in a match where if Rosser lost he'd have to leave NJPW Strong, ending Lawlor's reign at 397 days.

At Dominion 6.12 in Osaka-jo Hall, Lawlor was announced to be a participant in the G1 Climax 32 tournament as a part of the A Block, making his tournament debut and his NJPW debut in Japan. Lawlor ended his campaign with 6 points, failing to advance to the semi-finals.

For the rest of 2022, Lawlor entered a feud with Homicide that culminated in a Filthy Rules Fight victory at Battle in the Valley in 2023. Despite being a fixture for the revamped and streamlined NJPW Strong shows, Lawlor would fail to capture the NJPW World Television Championship from Zack Sabre Jr. at Capital Collision. Lawlor would return to Japan as he and most of Team Filthy participated at the NJPW Independence Day shows at Korakuen Hall. His victory over Kosei Fujita during Independence Day's first show was the last victory Lawlor had for New Japan in 2023. He would lose to Hiroshi Tanahashi, Tomohiro Ishii, and The DKC during Independence Day's second show (with the West Coast Wrecking Crew), Gabe Kidd during Fighting Spirit Unleashed, and Fred Rosser during Lonestar Shootout.

=== All Elite Wrestling (2023) ===
On the June 23, 2023 edition of AEW Rampage, Lawlor made his All Elite Wrestling (AEW) debut, alongside stablemate Royce Isaacs, by attacking Adam Cole after it was announced by AEW World Champion MJF that Cole and Lawlor would have a match at Forbidden Door. However, Cole was pulled from the match due to an illness and Lawlor faced Serpentico in a dark match at the event instead.

== Other media ==
In May 2015, Figure Four Online launched the Filthy Tom Lawlor Show (later renamed Filthy Four Daily), a weekly podcast featuring Lawlor discussing MMA and professional wrestling with host Bryan Alvarez. In September 2016, it was announced he would be making monthly appearances on The Bryan and Vinny Show to discuss SmackDown Live pay-per-views. He has also made appearances on Wrestling Observer Radio.

He is the co-host of the FRB Show with Front Row Brian.

== Personal life ==
Lawlor currently resides in Las Vegas, NV.

== Championships and accomplishments ==
=== Amateur wrestling ===
- National Collegiate Wrestling Association
  - NCWA National 235lbs Champion (2003, 2004, 2005)

=== Mixed martial arts ===
- Ultimate Fighting Championship
  - Fight of the Night (One time) vs. Aaron Simpson
  - Knockout of the Night (One time) vs. Jason MacDonald
  - Submission of the Night (One time) vs. CB Dollaway
  - Performance of the Night (One time) vs. Gian Villante
  - UFC.com Awards
    - 2009: Ranked #7 Submission of the Year vs. CB Dollaway

=== Professional wrestling ===
- Absolute Intense Wrestling
  - AIW Absolute Championship (1 time)
- Black Label Pro
  - BLP Heavyweight Championship (1 time)
  - BLP Midwest Championship (1 time)
  - BLP Heavyweight Championship Tournament (2017)
- Division One Pro Wrestling
  - FX Cup (2008)
- Major League Wrestling
  - MLW World Heavyweight Championship (1 time)
  - MLW World Tag Team Championship (1 time) - with Davey Boy Smith Jr.
  - Battle Riot (2018)
  - Opera Cup (2020)
- New Japan Pro-Wrestling
  - Strong Openweight Championship (1 time, inaugural)
  - New Japan Cup USA (2021)
- Paradigm Pro Wrestling
  - PPW Heavy Hitters Championship (1 time)
  - Heavy Hitters 5 Tournament (2023)
  - 5th Annual Grand Prix (2023)
- Prestige Wrestling
  - Prestige Championship (1 time)
  - 2nd Annual Rise Or Die Trying Tournament (2019)
- Pro Wrestling Illustrated
  - Ranked No. 59 of the top 500 singles wrestlers in the PWI 500 in 2021
- Relentless Wrestling
  - Relentless Heavyweight Championship (1 time, inaugural)

== Mixed martial arts record ==
Professional record breakdown
20 matches	11 wins	8 losses
By knockout	4	0
By submission	4	3
By decision	3	4
By disqualification	0	1
No contests	1	

Res.	Record	Opponent	Method	Event	Date	Round	Time	Location	Notes
Win	11–8 (1)	Jordan Young	Decision (unanimous)	PFL 5 (2021)	June 17, 2021	3	5:00	Atlantic City, New Jersey, United States	
Loss	10–8 (1)	Antônio Carlos Júnior	Submission (guillotine choke)	PFL 2 (2021)	April 29, 2021	1	4:43	Atlantic City, New Jersey, United States	
Loss	10–7 (1)	Deron Winn	Decision (unanimous)	Golden Boy Promotions: Liddell vs. Ortiz 3	November 24, 2018	3	5:00	Inglewood, California, United States	
Loss	10–6 (1)	Corey Anderson	Decision (unanimous)	UFC 196	March 5, 2016	3	5:00	Las Vegas, Nevada, United States	
Win	10–5 (1)	Gian Villante	TKO (punch)	UFC on Fox: Dillashaw vs. Barão 2	July 25, 2015	2	0:27	Chicago, Illinois, United States	Return to Light Heavyweight. Performance of the Night.
Win	9–5 (1)	Michael Kuiper	Submission (guillotine choke)	UFC on Fuel TV: Mousasi vs. Latifi	April 6, 2013	2	1:05	Stockholm, Sweden	
Loss	8–5 (1)	Francis Carmont	Decision (split)	UFC 154	November 17, 2012	3	5:00	Montreal, Quebec, Canada	
Win	8–4 (1)	Jason MacDonald	KO (punches)	UFC on Fuel TV: The Korean Zombie vs. Poirier	May 15, 2012	1	0:50	Fairfax, Virginia, United States	Knockout of the Night.
Loss	7–4 (1)	Chris Weidman	Technical Submission (brabo choke)	UFC 139	November 19, 2011	1	2:07	San Jose, California, United States	
Win	7–3 (1)	Patrick Côté	Decision (unanimous)	UFC 121	October 23, 2010	3	5:00	Anaheim, California, United States	
Loss	6–3 (1)	Joe Doerksen	Submission (rear-naked choke)	UFC 113	May 8, 2010	2	2:10	Montreal, Quebec, Canada	
Loss	6–2 (1)	Aaron Simpson	Decision (split)	UFC Fight Night: Maynard vs. Diaz	January 11, 2010	3	5:00	Fairfax, Virginia, United States	Fight of the Night.
Win	6–1 (1)	C. B. Dollaway	Technical Submission (guillotine choke)	UFC 100	July 11, 2009	1	0:55	Las Vegas, Nevada, United States	Middleweight debut. Submission of the Night.
Win	5–1 (1)	Kyle Kingsbury	Decision (unanimous)	The Ultimate Fighter: Team Nogueira vs Team Mir Finale	December 13, 2008	3	5:00	Las Vegas, Nevada, United States	
Win	4–1 (1)	Travis Bartlett	Technical Submission (rear-naked choke)	Full Force 20	April 12, 2008	1	1:10	Foxborough, Massachusetts, United States	
Loss	3–1 (1)	Shane Primm	DQ (illegal knee to the head)	World Fighting Championships 6	March 22, 2008	1	0:24	Tampa, Florida, United States	
Win	3–0 (1)	Cesar Barros	KO (punches)	Full Force 15	August 25, 2007	1	0:10	Mansfield, Massachusetts, United States	
Win	2–0 (1)	Jason Barlog	TKO (punches)	WFC 3	April 7, 2007	1	3:59	Tampa, Florida, United States	
Win	1–0 (1)	Jonathan Fernandez	Submission (rear naked choke)	X-treme Fighting Championships	April 3, 2007	1	1:20	Tampa, Florida, United States	
NC	0–0 (1)	Ariel Gandulla	No Contest	Kick Enterprises	March 10, 2007	1	N/A	Fort Myers, Florida, United States	Fighters fell through cage door.

== Amateur mixed martial arts record ==
Professional record breakdown
1 match	1 win	0 losses
By knockout	1	0
By submission	0	0
By decision	0	0

Res.	Record	Opponent	Method	Event	Date	Round	Time	Location	Notes
Win	1–0	Rich Mitchell	KO (punches)	XF: Xtreme Fighting 5	July 26, 2003	1	0:54	Fall River, Massachusetts, United States	

== See also ==
- List of male mixed martial artists
