= Major League Wrestling =

American professional wrestling promotion

MLW, LLC
- Trade name: Major League Wrestling
- Type: Holding
- Industry: Professional wrestling
- Genre: "Hybrid Wrestling"
- Founded: April 7, 2002; 24 years ago (original); July 2017; 9 years ago (revival)
- Founders: Court Bauer
- Headquarters: Charleston, South Carolina, U.S.
- Key people: Court Bauer (CEO and president); Josef Samael (Head of Talent Relations)
- Products: Publishing; Television; Merchandise; Pay-per-view; Live events
- Services: Licensing
- Owner: Court Bauer
- Divisions: MLW Radio Network
- Subsidiaries: MLW Media, LLC
- Website: mlw.com

Major League Wrestling (MLW) is an American professional wrestling promotion based in Charleston, South Carolina. The promotion was founded in 2002 in Philadelphia, Pennsylvania, by former WWE writer Court Bauer. The promotion markets its product as "Hybrid Wrestling", with its roster featuring a mix of different professional wrestling styles.

The promotion originally ran live events until 2004, with these events seen on the television series, MLW Underground TV. MLW returned to promoting events in July 2017, and resumed weekly television programming with the premiere of MLW Fusion in April 2018.

== History ==
=== Formation and first closure (2002–2004) ===
Following the closures and acquisitions of World Championship Wrestling (WCW) and Extreme Championship Wrestling (ECW) by the World Wrestling Federation (WWF, now known as the WWE) in 2001, Major League Wrestling (MLW) was founded in 2002. Shortly after its founding, the promotion spent three months moving its headquarters from Philadelphia to New York. MLW styled itself as an alternative to WWE's sports entertainment, following in the tradition of ECW.

In 2003, MLW again moved its base of operations to Florida, and negotiated a deal with Sunshine Network to air a television series titled Underground TV, which ran between April 7, 2003, and February 14, 2004. The series was hosted by Joey Styles, later replaced by Kevin Kelly, and consisted of pre-taped matches from prior events. Furthering MLW's ties to ECW, the promotion highlighted many former ECW talents, such as Sabu, Terry Funk, Shane Douglas, and Steve Corino. This led to criticism of MLW for being an imitation of ECW in comparison to Ring of Honor, another Philadelphia-founded promotion that launched five months prior to MLW's formation.

After shuttering in 2004, Major League Wrestling returned in 2011 as a podcast network, initially focused on producing broadcast and digital content relating to the professional wrestling industry. Many prominent professional wrestling figures have appeared on the network, including former WWE and WCW stars Kevin Sullivan, Jim Duggan, MVP, current WWE executive Bruce Prichard, former WCW and current AEW commentator Tony Schiavone, former WCW and WWE manager Jim Cornette, and former WCW President and WWE executive Eric Bischoff.

=== Revival (2017–2023) ===
==== Return and expansion ====
In 2017, MLW announced that it would once again be promoting wrestling events. Tickets for its first event, MLW One-Shot, went on sale on July 21, 2017. In the same year, MLW announced it would run more shows in Orlando in 2018. Given the success of its independent outings, MLW was able to secure a television deal with beIN Sports for a new program, titled MLW Fusion, which debuted on April 20, 2018, on beIN Sports USA. Its first episode featured Pentagon Jr. against Fenix as the main event.

In July 2018, the inaugural Battle Riot aired as a Fusion television special. MLW began introducing contracts as part of its growth strategy. In August, the promotion started a working agreement with Mexican-based promotion Lucha Libre AAA Worldwide (AAA). On September 19, it was announced that MLW expanded its partnership with beIN Sports to air Fusion in Spanish.

In October, MLW announced a Halloween-themed Fusion television special, and announced the signings of PCO and Richard Holliday as full-time members of the roster on October 18. It was also reported that Court Bauer and several MLW executives would travel to Monaco for Sportel, with intentions of making a big push internationally. Also announced was a project between MLW and Spiff TV.

On November 8, 2018, MLW held a Fusion television taping, named Fightland, in Chicago at Cicero Stadium. Bauer claimed that the event drew the highest attendance in MLW history, shattering the previous attendance record of 1,536 people for the June 20, 2003 event, Hybrid Hell, in Florida. On November 29, Bauer announced that Fusion would be broadcast live on beIN Sports on December 14. This coincided with the two-day television tapings in Miami: "Never Say Never" and "Zero Hour"; the live episode was an hour of "Zero Hour"'s events.

MLW continued to air live Fusion specials throughout 2019, including SuperFight in February and Intimidation Games in March. The company brought former manager Jim Cornette on as a color commentator starting March 2, 2019. He continued to work for the company for Rise of the Renegades, Battle Riot II, and Fury Road. He also worked unofficially in an agent-like role for the company. This included coaching younger talent on their television presentation and promos. In addition to SuperFight and Intimidation Games, Rise of the Renegades and Battle Riot II were all revealed to have sold out.

In April 2019, MLW moved its operations into a corporate office building in New Rochelle, New York. On April 18, MLW announced the creation of a new title: the MLW National Openweight Championship, with the inaugural champion to be crowned during Fury Road in Waukesha, Wisconsin. In June 2019, International Wrestling Association (IWA-PR) owner Savio Vega was brought in as an on-air talent and backstage agent. This working relationship resulted in the use of the IWA Caribbean Heavyweight Championship in MLW storylines. On August 18, 2019, MLW teased the formation of its women's division, later announcing its official launch on October 18, 2019. The division's first official match would be later held at MLW Blood and Thunder on November 9, 2019.

On July 5, it was announced that MLW would hold its first pay-per-view event, Saturday Night SuperFight, which would be held on November 2. On July 26, MLW announced a working agreement with Japanese-based promotion Pro Wrestling Noah, which would include a talent-exchange agreement and content collaboration between the two promotions. On August 8, MLW announced that it had reached a new deal with FITE TV to carry MLW pay-per-view events, with the first event being Saturday Night SuperFight. Four days later, MLW announced a working relationship with Mexican-based promotion The Crash Lucha Libre termed as a "strategic alliance". On August 23, MLW and The Crash announced they would co-promote their first event on October 5 at the Auditorio Fausto Gutierrez in Tijuana, Mexico.

On February 1, 2020, MLW announced a working relationship with Japanese promotion Dragon Gate (DG), which would include a talent-exchange between the two promotions.

==== Effects of COVID-19 ====
After AAA vs MLW on March 13, 2020, MLW took a six-month hiatus due to the COVID-19 pandemic. On April 21, MLW announced it had begun digitizing the 2003–2004 tape library, including the complete run of MLW Underground TV. On April 30, MLW announced a limited series titled MLW Anthology to air on Bein Sports starting May 16, 2020. Following the last episode of Fusion on May 9, 2020, a new digital spinoff series titled Pulp Fusion would launch on MLW's YouTube channel beginning on May 29, 2020.

On June 9, 2020, MLW reached a new media rights deal to stream its programming on DAZN. CEO Court Bauer also announced during the same month that reruns of MLW Underground TV would air on Bein Sports throughout the summer.

In August 2020, MLW announced that Fusion TV tapings would resume in October of that year. On September 10, it was announced that MLW Fusion would move to Wednesday nights on fubo Sports Network. On October 10, it was revealed that Fusion would return on November 18 at 7pm EST and new episodes would also premiere on MLW's YouTube channel on the same night.

In October 2020, MLW announced a "strategic alliance" with IWA-PR for the "celebration of inter-promotional events, direct support to the events of each of the companies and collaboration in other types of promotions". MLW would also began incorporating story elements from the now-defunct Lucha Libre promotion and television drama, Lucha Underground, into an angle involving IWA-PR. Talent formally associated with Lucha Underground were brought into MLW as part of the "Azteca Underground" stable.

In April 2021, MLW announced a television deal with Vice TV. A block of MLW programming, including reruns of Fusion, began airing on Saturdays starting May 1. The agreement would further expand when it was announced on September 17 that Vice would air MLW Fightland as a television special on October 7.

On the April 21, episode of MLW Fusion, Bauer announced that MLW's "new season" would begin on July 10, 2021, at the 2300 Arena in Philadelphia. Later revealed to be Battle Riot III, the event would be MLW's first since the pandemic to have a live audience in attendance. On April 29, 2021, MLW announced a partnership with Revolution Pro Wrestling.

In June 2021, Wrestling Observer reported that MLW had ended its deal with DAZN. it was also reported that MLW had begun taping content in Los Angeles for a spinoff series that would "resemble Lucha Underground", with plans to film vignettes in the summer and matches in the fall. It would later be revealed on August 4, 2021, that MLW had signed a deal to produce a new series centered around Azteca Underground, featuring a different roster from that seen on MLW Fusion. In an update during Wrestling Observer Radio on November 1, 2021, Meltzer reported that tapings for the series were cancelled because MLW was unable to secure a TV deal.

On July 7, 2021, it was announced that Shimmer Women Athletes co-founder Dave Prazak had joined MLW to help relaunch its women's division; later to be announced in September as the MLW Women's Featherweight division.

During the television premiere of Battle Riot III on July 24, 2021, MLW announced a new season of Fusion to air on "a new home" in the Fall, and a new, four-part mini-series titled MLW Fusion: Alpha. Initially announced to air in August, Fusion: Alpha was later announced as "a new season and series from MLW" to premiere on September 22 on MLW's YouTube channel, and would air on Saturdays and Mondays on Bein Sports.

On December 7, 2021, MLW announced a new "anthology mini-series" titled MLW Azteca to premiere on Thursday, January 6, 2022, on MLW's YouTube channel and FITE TV.

==== WWE lawsuit and new partnerships ====
On January 11, 2022, MLW filed an anti-trust lawsuit against WWE, accusing it of interfering in television and streaming deals and poaching talent. Through the lawsuit, it was disclosed that a streaming deal with Fox Corporation–owned Tubi was terminated due to WWE allegedly threatening to pull its programming from the sibling Fox broadcast network. The suit also alleged that WWE pressured Vice TV to withdraw from negotiations with MLW. In February 2023, the lawsuit was dismissed due to a lack of "sufficient facts to plausibly allege a relevant antitrust product market" and that its "allegations are insufficient to plausibly allege a relevant product market." MLW was given 21 days to file an amendment to its lawsuit.

On July 5, 2022, MLW announced a new broadcast deal with Ayozat TV in the United Kingdom. Two days later, MLW announced an expanded agreement with beIN Sports USA to carry the promotion's programming on BeIN Sports Xtra, both through its FAST channel and across its over-the-air television station affiliates, on Friday nights.

On October 11, 2022, MLW announced a partnership with streaming platform Pro Wrestling TV (PWTV), bringing the promotion's programming library to the service. The partnership began on November 3, with the premiere of the Battle Riot IV event. MLW Fusion would return for a new season the following week on November 10.

On January 20, 2023, MLW announced a new broadcast deal with Reelz in the United States, with a new weekly flagship show titled MLW Underground Wrestling premiering on February 7.

In February, Reelz reached an agreement with NBCUniversal-owned streaming service Peacock for the network's programming and live feed to be carried on the service. However, due to a pre-existing exclusivity agreement with WWE, MLW programming was blacked out on Reelz's live feed on the service. On February 28, Variety reported that MLW's deal with Reelz would conclude after 10 weeks. However, in a statement made to PWInsider, the network confirmed that "No decisions have been made by MLW or REELZ and we are both committed to a good outcome for MLW, its fans and REELZ." On March 7, MLW filed an amended lawsuit against WWE, citing WWE's alleged interference with the promotion's deal with Reelz.

In March 2023, MLW reached an agreement with the Premier Streaming Network to distribute MLW Underground Wrestling outside of the U.S.

On May 2, 2023, a new partnership with FITE was announced, in which MLW would produce live specials for subscribers to FITE+. The first event under this deal was Never Say Never on July 8. It would be MLW's first live broadcast since the 2019 Saturday Night SuperFight pay-per-view event, which had also been carried by FITE.

On the August 24, 2023 episode of Fusion, MLW announced a new partnership with New Japan Pro-Wrestling would begin at Fury Road on September 3, 2023.

On December 11, 2023, MLW and WWE reached a settlement in the former's antitrust lawsuit. MLW's lawsuit was dismissed with prejudice on December 26, 2023. It would later be revealed in a 10-K filing of TKO Group Holdings, the holding company created by that year's merger of WWE and the UFC, that they had paid $20 million to MLW.

=== Restructuring (2023–2025) ===
In December 2023, SE Scoops reported that MLW was "overhauling" its front office.

In January 2024, MLW revamped its event schedule to air two events every month: a live, premium event for Triller TV+ subscribers, and a free, taped TV special for Bein Sports and MLW's YouTube channel.

MLW Azteca Lucha, the promotion's first event to take place at Cicero Stadium since Saturday Night SuperFight in November 2019, would break MLW's all-time box office record with the announcement that tickets were sold out on April 29.

During the same month, MLW announced in a Community post on its YouTube channel that it had launched a membership program, later named the "MLW Standard Pass". Past uploads from MLW's weekly programming library, and several full match videos, became paywalled. Ahead of Battle Riot VI on June 1, it was reported that MLW would be moving its streaming events to its YouTube channel as part of the rollout of its membership program. This ended the promotion's partnership with Triller TV.

On June 26, 2024, David Marquez (founder of Championship Wrestling and the United Wrestling Network) was announced as MLW's new head of production. It was also announced that David Sahadi (who previously worked for Total Nonstop Action Wrestling) has joined MLW's production crew. Both would later depart MLW.

=== Relocation to South Carolina (2025–present) ===
On November 19, 2025, Major League Wresting announced that they would move their headquarters from New York to the city of Charleston, South Carolina. The next night, during the MLW x Don Gato Tequila: Lucha de los Muertos event held in the city, it was announced that MLW Fusion would return in 2026. Battle Riot VIII, held on January 29, 2026, would see the promotion revert back to producing weekly taped programming for its YouTube channel; the main event aired as a standalone special on February 5, while the new season of Fusion would premiere on Saturday, May 30 at 6:05pm EST.

On May 26, MLW announced a partnership with Live Nation Entertainment to stream Fusion on Veeps. On September 17, 2026, MLW announced that they had signed a distribution deal with Fox Corporation's Tubi to premiere new episodes of Fusion on the service beginning that night at 8:00pm EST. Reruns of Fusion previously aired on Tubi via Bein Sports Xtra's FAST channel in 2022.

On September 30, 2026, MLW announced that they would be holding their second-ever pay-per-view event, Saturday Night SuperFight, and that it would be streamed live on Veeps. On October 6, 2026, MLW announced that tickets for Saturday Night SuperFight had been sold out.

== Touring and TV tapings ==
In the beginning, MLW would hold one show a month, originally from the Viking Hall in Philadelphia, Pennsylvania. By the end of 2002, MLW began running two shows a month and, in 2003, multiple shows in a weekend were held in New York. The first time MLW left New York was December 20, 2002, for King Of Kings from the War Memorial Auditorium in Fort Lauderdale, Florida. The promotion primarily held events in Florida prior to closing its doors in 2004.

MLW initially held shows in Florida since their revival in 2017. Soon after the debut of MLW Fusion in 2018 on beIN Sports USA, the promotion would once again resuming touring, returning to New York later that year. On September 18, 2018, MLW announced their debut in Chicago. On October 19, 2018, MLW announced that they would return to Florida to make their Miami debut.

From Fall 2020 until 2021, due to the COVID-19 pandemic, MLW would return to Gilt Nightclub in Florida to tape their programming behind closed doors. From July to December 2021, MLW programming was taped at the 2300 Arena from the promotion's home base in Philadelphia, Pennsylvania. The promotion would resume a regular touring schedule later that year, beginning with their second joint show with The Crash Lucha Libre in December.

Matches and segments from the 2022 Fightland event that were originally taped for Fusion were later repurposed for the promotion's short-lived television series, MLW Underground Wrestling, which premiered on February 7, 2023 on Reelz.

From late 2022, and throughout 2023, MLW would predominantly host events from the 2300 Arena in Philadelphia. At the end of 2023, MLW would cease airing weekly television programming. Beginning at One Shot on December 7, 2023, select matches would be taped during MLW's live events, and later air as part of television specials produced for Bein Sports and MLW's YouTube channel.

Beginning with Battle Riot VIII on January 29, 2026, MLW would return to tape delayed programming.

== Roster and contracts ==
In 2018, after the promotion was revived, MLW signed some talent to exclusive contracts. The exclusive contracts give MLW power over the talent's booking dates; MLW wrestlers are allowed to perform for other promotions but have to prioritize MLW events. In addition to contracted wrestlers, MLW's roster also consists of unsigned independent contractors who primarily appear in other promotions.

=== Partnerships ===
MLW currently maintains working relationships with Revolution Pro Wrestling, New Japan Pro-Wrestling, Tokyo Joshi Pro-Wrestling, and Consejo Mundial de Lucha Libre. Wrestlers from these promotions may make appearances on MLW programming and events, much like MLW's contracted wrestlers.

On May 16, 2026, MLW announced forming a strategic partnership with the Japanese joshi puroresu promotion World Wonder Ring Stardom.

== Championships and accomplishments ==
=== Current champions ===
As of November 13, 2026.

=== Men's division ===
Singles

Championship	Current champion(s)	Reign	Date won	Days held	Location	Notes	Ref.
MLW World Heavyweight Championship	Josh Bishop	1	November 7, 2026	6+	Cicero, Illinois	Defeated Killer Kross in a Last Man Standing match at Saturday Night SuperFight.	
MLW National Openweight Championship	Matt Riddle	1	November 8, 2026	5+	Cicero, Illinois	Defeated Austin Aries at Lucha de los Muertos.	
MLW World Middleweight Championship	Templario	2	May 1, 2026	196+	Mexico City, Mexico	Defeated Kushida on CMLL Viernes Espectacular: CMLL vs. MLW	
MLW Southern Crown Championship	LaBron Kozone	1	October 3, 2026	41+	Atlanta, Georgia	Defeated Joe Coffey on Fusion.	

Tag team

Championship	Current champion(s)	Reign	Date won	Days held	Location	Notes	Ref.
MLW World Tag Team Championship	The Good Brothers (Doc Gallows and Karl Anderson)	1	May 9, 2026	188+	Chattanooga, Tennessee	Defeated The Skyscrapers (Donovan Dijak and Bishop Dyer) in a Tennessee Tornado match on Fusion.	

=== Women's division ===
Championship	Current champion(s)	Reign	Date won	Days held	Location	Notes	Ref.
MLW World Women's Featherweight Championship	Masha	1	September 12, 2026	62+	Charleston, South Carolina	Defeated Shotzi Blackheart on Fusion. Will air on tape delay.	

=== Defunct championships ===
Championship	Date introduced	First champion(s)	Date retired	Final champion(s)	Notes
MLW World Junior Heavyweight Championship	September 19, 2003	Sonjay Dutt	February 14, 2004	Sonjay Dutt	Dutt defeated Christopher Daniels in a tournament final to become the inaugural (and sole) champion. Dutt was no longer listed as champion after MLW stopped promoting events; the championship was not brought back after MLW's promotional return.
MLW Caribbean Heavyweight Championship	June 15, 2019 (Note: This date marks the start of MLW's recognition of the championship; the championship had previously been used in the International Wrestling Association from 2009–2012.)	Savio Vega (Note: Savio Vega was the first champion recognized by MLW; the inaugural titleholder recognized by the International Wrestling Association was GQ The Ravishing.)	January 6, 2023	Octagón Jr.	The championship ceased being listed on MLW.com after it was declared vacant by the International Wrestling Association (IWA-PR) on January 6, 2023. The championship continues to be defended in IWA-PR as the "IWA Puerto Rico/Caribbean Heavyweight Championship".

=== Other accomplishments ===
Accomplishment	Latest winner(s)	Date won	Location	Notes
Battle Riot	Killer Kross	January 29, 2026	Kissimmee, Florida	Last eliminated Matt Riddle to win the MLW World Championship
Opera Cup	Mistico	November 20, 2025	Charleston, South Carolina	Defeated Volador Jr. in the finals of a sixeteen-man single elimination tournament.

== See also ==
- List of Major League Wrestling events
