= Kings of Colosseum (2022) =

2022 Major League Wrestling professional wrestling event

- Promotion: Major League Wrestling
- Date: May 13, 2022 (aired July 14, 2022)
- City: Philadelphia, Pennsylvania
- Venue: 2300 Arena
- Attendance: 1,000-1,200

Event chronology
← Previous; Azteca Underground	Next → Battle Riot IV

Kings of Colosseum chronology
← Previous; 2021	Next → 2024

Kings of Colosseum (2022) was a professional wrestling supercard event produced by Major League Wrestling (MLW), which took place on May 13, 2022, at the 2300 Arena in Philadelphia, Pennsylvania.

The event was the third under the Kings of Colosseum chronology and a television taping for MLW Fusion; the main event aired as part of the season finale on July 14, 2022.

== Production ==
=== Background ===
Other on-screen personnel
Role:	Name:
Commentators	Joe Dombrowski
Commentators	Rich Bocchini

The first Kings of Colosseum event was held on July 6, 2019, and aired live as a special episode of MLW's weekly television series, Fusion. On January 31, 2022, MLW announced that the third Kings of Colosseum would take place on May 13 at the 2300 Arena in Philadelphia, Pennsylvania.

=== Storylines ===
The card will consist of matches that resulted from scripted storylines, where wrestlers portrayed villains, heroes, or less distinguishable characters in scripted events that built tension and culminated in a wrestling match or series of matches, with results predetermined by MLW's writers.

As part of MLW's "Open Door" Policy, the promotion will announce several free agents for Kings of Colosseum, including the MLW returns of former MLW World Middleweight Champion Lio Rush and Taya Valkyrie. Debuts include former WWE wrestler Lince Dorado. Former MLW alumni made appearances at the event in celebration of the promotion's 20th anniversary, including Los Maximos (Joel, Jose & Wil Maximo) and ECW alum The Sandman.

The main feud heading into Kings of Colosseum was between MLW World Heavyweight Champion Alexander Hammerstone and Dynasty stablemate Richard Holliday, who turned on the former at the end of the February 10, 2022 Fusion season premiere. At Azteca Underground, Holliday, Muertes & Mads Krügger defeated Hammerstone & The Von Erichs (Marshall Von Erich & Ross Von Erich) in a Trios Match. On April 6, it was announced that Hammerstone would defend his World Heavyweight Championship against Holliday at Kings of Colosseum.

Former Contra Unit teammates Jacob Fatu and Mads Krügger had been embroiled in a feud since the dissolution of the faction at War Chamber The two would meet in a Grudge Match on the February 24, 2022 episode of Fusion, where Fatu was victorious. Krügger would rematch Fatu in a Stairway to Hell Match on March 24, where the former picked up the win. Onn April 13, MLW.com announced that Fatu and Krügger will again meet in a Weapons of Mass Destruction Match at Kings of Colosseum. Weapons will be hidden inside military crates, which the two are free to break open and use whatever weapons are inside.

The Von Erichs were scheduled to challenge MLW World Tag Team Champions 5150 (Danny Rivera & Slice Boogie) at the Blood & Thunder Fusion tapings, but tested positive for COVID-19. As a storyline excuse, 5150 attacked The Von Erichs with steel chairs backstage on the February 17, 2022 episode. 5150 would later defeat replacements Los Parks (El Hijo de L.A. Park & L.A. Park Jr.) in a ladder match. 5150 would go on to lose the tag team titles on the April 1 episode of Fusion to the team of EJ Nduka & Calvin Tankman, collectively known as "Hustle & Power". Two weeks later, while Rivera was insulting the city of Dallas, he was confronted by The Von Erichs, only for the latter to be attacked by original LAX member Hernandez. The two teams would face off in a Bunkhouse Brawl, with The Von Erichs winning. On April 28, MLW announced a three-way tag team match for the MLW World Tag Team Championship, with Hustle and Power defending against The Von Erichs and the team of Rivera & Hernandez at Kings of Colosseum.

On March 5, MLW announced the official creation of the MLW Women's Featherweight Championship, with the inaugural champion to be crowned at a later date. On April 21, MLW announced that the inaugural champion will be decided at Kings of Colosseum, when Holidead faces the returning Taya Valkyrie.

On May 4, MLW announced "The Thrilla in Phila" prize fight challenge, in conjunction with MLW National Openweight Champion Alex Kane's Bomaye Fight Club. This is an open challenge where if the challenger can last twenty minutes in the ring with Kane, they will earn $20,000. However, this challenge also doubles as a title match, and if the challenger can beat Kane in under twenty minutes, they will become the new National Openweight Champion.

On the February 24 episode of Fusion, former MLW commentator Mister Saint Laurent introduced Mexican mini-estrella Microman to MLW. Microman would be regularly seen in Trios matches against members of Gangrel's stable, Strange Sangre. On May 6, MLW announced that Microman will make his singles debut at Kings of Colosseum, taking on Strange Sangre's Mini Abismo Negro.

== Results ==
No.	Results	Stipulations	Times
1	Gangrel (with Arez, Holidead, and Mini Abismo Negro) defeated Budd Heavy by pinfall	Singles match	1:30
2	Matt Cross defeated A. C. H. by pinfall	Singles match	6:17
3	Alex Kane (with Mr. Thomas) (c) vs. Davey Richards ended in a time limit draw	$20,000 "Thrilla In Phila" Prize Fight Challenge for the MLW National Openweight Championship; Since Richards drew with Kane, he earned the $20,000 prize Had Richards beaten Kane in under 20 minutes, he would've become the new MLW National Openweight Champion	20:00
4	Lince Dorado, Taya Valkyrie & Micro Man defeated Strange Sangre (Arez, Holidead & Mini Abismo Negro) (with Dr. Dax and Gangrel) by pinfall	Trios match	6:32
5	Los Maximos (Joel and Jose) defeated Jaden Valo & Kris Kage by pinfall	Tag team match	2:38
6	Myron Reed (c) defeated Arez and KC Navarro by pinfall	Three-way match for the MLW World Middleweight Championship	6:09
7	Alexander Hammerstone (c) defeated Richard Holliday (with Alicia Atout) by pinfall	Singles match for the MLW World Heavyweight Championship	9:53
8	The Samoan SWAT Team (Juicy Finau & Lance Anoa'i) (with Jacob Fatu) defeated Los Aztecas (Uno & Cinco) (with Cesar Duran) by pinfall	Tag team match	2:24
9	Taya Valkyrie defeated Holidead (with Dr. Dax and Gangrel) by submission	Singles match to crown the inaugural MLW Women's Featherweight Champion	9:00
10	Hustle & Power (EJ Nduka & Calvin Tankman) (c) defeated The Von Erichs (Marshall & Ross) and 5150 (Danny Rivera & Hernandez) by pinfall	Three-way tornado tag team match for the MLW World Tag Team Championship	9:12
11	Real1 defeated Lince Dorado by pinfall	Singles match	9:58
12	Brittany Blake defeated Zoey Skye by submission	Singles match	2:37
13	Jacob Fatu defeated Mads Krügger by pinfall	Weapons of Mass Destruction match	16:27
(c) / – the champion(s) heading into the match
