= Kings of Colosseum (2024) =

2024 Major League Wrestling event

- Promotional poster featuring various competitors
- Promotion: Major League Wrestling
- Date: January 6, 2024
- City: Philadelphia, Pennsylvania
- Venue: 2300 Arena
- Attendance: 900-1,000

Event chronology
← Previous; One Shot	Next → SuperFight

Kings of Colosseum chronology
← Previous; 2022	Next → 2025

Kings of Colosseum (2024) was a professional wrestling pay-per-view event produced by Major League Wrestling (MLW). It took place on January 6, 2024, at the 2300 Arena in Philadelphia, Pennsylvania, and streamed live on Triller TV (formally known as FITE). It was the fourth event under the Kings of Colosseum chronology.

Additional matches were taped for "MLW Reload," a TV special named after the 2002 event, which aired on BeIN Sports USA and MLW's YouTube channel on January 20.

== Production ==
=== Background ===
Other on-screen personnel
Role:	Name:
Commentators	Joe Dombrowski
Commentators	Matt Striker

Kings of Colosseum is a reoccurring professional wrestling supercard event produced by MLW that was first held on July 6, 2019. The first event would air live as a special episode of MLW's weekly television series, Fusion.

On September 3, 2023, at Fury Road, MLW announced that Blood & Thunder would take place on January 6, 2024. On December 11, however, it was announced that Kings of Colosseum would be taking place on January 6, at the 2300 Arena in Philadelphia, Pennsylvania, replacing Blood & Thunder on that date. As part of MLW's partnership with Triller TV to produce live specials for TrillerTV+ subscribers, the 2024 edition will also be the first to air live since the inaugural event in 2019.

=== Storylines ===
The card consisted of matches that result from scripted storylines, where wrestlers portrayed villains, heroes, or less distinguishable characters in scripted events that built tension and culminated in a wrestling match or series of matches, with results predetermined by MLW's writers. Storylines were played out on MLW Fusion, and the league's social media platforms.

As part of MLW's "Open Door Policy," several free agents and freelancers were set for the event. This included the MLW returns of Sami Callihan and Matt Riddle. In addition, several wrestlers from partner promotion Tokyo Joshi Pro-Wrestling (TJPW) also competed, including Hyper Misao, Nao Kakuta, and Moka Miyamoto.

After Alex Kane successfully defended the MLW World Heavyweight Championship against Matt Cardona at One Shot, Kane called out anyone to challenge him. The lights went out and Richard Holliday appeared, marking his first appearance in MLW since Battle Riot IV in June 2022. Mister Saint Laurent then offered Holliday a world title match against Kane which Holliday accepted, joining the World Titan Federation (WTF). The match was then made official for Kings of Colosseum.

For several months, Love, Doug has attempted to attract the attention of B3cca. On the Fusion on Thanksgiving special aired on November 23, Doug received an invitation for a rendezvous. However, it turned out the invitation was sent by Brett Ryan Gosselin, who was B3cca's boyfriend. Gosselin would bludgeon Doug with a crowbar, leaving him bloody and with multiple injuries to the face. On December 13, MLW announced on their website that Doug and Gosselin will compete in a "Love is Blind(fold)" match at Kings of Colosseum.

Akira and Rickey Shane Page of The Calling had been feuding ever since Akira lost the MLW World Middleweight Championship at Slaughterhouse. It came to a head at the following Fightland event, where The Calling lost the MLW World Tag Team Championship to the Second Gear Crew (Matthew Justice and 1 Called Manders). After the match, Page and the rest of The Calling attacked Akira, kicking him out of the group. On the season finale of Fusion, Akira challenged Page for the latter's MLW National Openweight Championship, but was quickly defeated. The Calling would conduct a post-match assault on Akira afterwards. On December 19, MLW announced a rematch between the two for the title in a Taipei Deathmatch, where both participants will have taped fists covered in broken glass.

== Results ==
Kings of Colosseum
No.	Results	Stipulations	Times
1	Wasted Youth (Dyln McKay and Marcus Mathers) and Alec Price defeated The Dirty Ass Bastards (TJ Crawford, Griffin McCoy and Tony Deppen) by pinfall	Six-man tag team match	9:46
2	Janai Kai (c) (with Salina de la Renta) defeated Hyper Misao by submission	Singles match for the MLW World Women's Featherweight Championship	7:15
3	The Second Gear Crew (Matthew Justice and 1 Called Manders) (c) defeated World Titan Federation (Tom Lawlor and Josh Bishop) (with Mister Saint Laurent) by pinfall	Tag team match for the MLW World Tag Team Championship	15:40
4	Rickey Shane Page (c) defeated Akira by pinfall	Taipei Deathmatch for the MLW National Openweight Championship	12:23
5	Love, Doug defeated Brett Ryan Gosselin by pinfall	Love is Blind(fold) match	3:22
6	Alex Kane (c) (with Mr. Thomas) defeated Richard Holliday (with Mister Saint Laurent) by submission	Singles match for the MLW World Heavyweight Championship	13:55
7	Matt Riddle defeated Jacob Fatu by submission	Singles match	12:28
(c) / – the champion(s) heading into the match

Reload (January 20)
No.	Results	Stipulations	Times
1	Zayda (with Mister Saint Laurent) defeated Notorious Mimi by pinfall	Singles match	4:48
2	Masked Good Brother #3 defeated Steph De Lander by pinfall	Intergender match	8:53
3	Ichiban defeated Jimmy Lloyd by pinfall	Singles match	6:03
4	Nao Kakuta defeated Moka Miyamoto by pinfall	Singles match	6:50
5	Delmi Exo defeated Tiara James by pinfall	Singles match	2:34
6	Alex Kane and Matt Riddle (with The Bomaye Fight Club (Faye Jackson and Mr. Thomas)) defeated World Titan Federation (Josh Bishop and Tom Lawlor) (with Zayda and Mister Saint Laurent) by pinfall	Tag team match	10:40
7	Satoshi Kojima defeated Sami Callihan by pinfall	Singles match	9:09
