= Kings of Colosseum (2026) =

2026 Major League Wrestling event

- Promotion: Major League Wrestling
- Date: May 9, 2026 (aired September 5, 2026)
- City: Chattanooga, Tennessee
- Venue: The Signal

Event chronology
← Previous; CMLL vs. MLW 2	Next → Summer of the Beasts

Kings of Colosseum chronology
← Previous; 2025	Next → —

Kings of Colosseum (2026) was a professional wrestling event produced by Major League Wrestling (MLW) which took place at The Signal in Chattanooga, Tennessee on May 9, 2026. It was the sixth event in the Kings of Colosseum chronology. The event aired on tape delay as a special episode of Fusion on BeIN Sports USA and streamed on MLW's YouTube channel on September 5, 2026.

== Production ==
=== Background ===
Kings of Colosseum is a reoccurring professional wrestling supercard event produced by MLW that was first held on July 6, 2019. The first event would air live as a special episode of MLW's weekly television series, Fusion.

On September 15, 2025, MLW announced that Kings of Colosseum would take place on January 10, 2026, at the NYTEX Sports Centre in North Richland Hills, Texas. This would have been the second consecutive Kings of Colosseum held at the venue, following 2025. On November 17, 2025, All Elite Wrestling announced that it was holding a four-date residency at the Esports Arena in Arlington, Texas in January 2026. One of AEW's Collision events clashed with MLW's planned Kings of Colosseum date, held just 16 miles away. On November 25, MLW announced that the Kings of Colosseum would be rescheduled for later in the year due to the announcement of new events around its original date. Eventually, plans for Kings of Colosseum to held in North Richland Hills were scrapped altogether and instead the 2026 event was held as part of the promotion's May 9, 2026 television taping in Chattanooga, Tennessee. It was streamed as a special edition of MLW's weekly hour-long program, Fusion, on September 5, 2026.

=== Storylines ===
The card consisted of matches that result from scripted storylines, where wrestlers portrayed villains, heroes, or less distinguishable characters in scripted events that built tension and culminate in a wrestling match or series of matches, with results predetermined by MLW's writers. Storylines were played out at MLW events, and across the league's social media platforms.

== Results ==
No.	Results	Stipulations	Times
1^{FT}	Jumbo won by last eliminating Wolfgang (Note: Order of elimination: Manny Lo, Terry "Flip" Sequoyah, Andrew Everett, Okumura, Ikuro Kwon, Azteca 44, Don Gato, CJ Gallows, Mark Coffey, LaBron Kozone, Diego Hill, and Wolfgang.)	14-man battle royal (Fusion – August 15)	5:55
2^{FT}	Joe Coffey (with Mark Coffey and Wolfgang) defeated LaBron Kozone by pinfall	Singles match (Fusion – August 15)	7:54
3^{FT}	The Good Brothers (Doc Gallows and Karl Anderson) defeated The Skyscrapers (Donovan Dijak and Bishop Dyer) (c) by pinfall	Tennessee Tornado match for the MLW World Tag Team Championship (Fusion – August 15)	10:57
4^{FT}	Zamaya defeated Angelica Risk by pinfall	Singles match (Fusion – August 22)	2:01
5^{FT}	Trevor Lee (c) defeated Kushida (with Okumura) by pinfall	Singles match for the MLW Southern Crown Championship (Fusion – August 22)	10:39
6^{FT}	Austin Aries (c) defeated Averno and Místico by pinfall	Three-way match for the MLW National Openweight Championship (Fusion – August 22)	14:06
7^{FT}	Shotzi defeated Corinne Joy (with Jazzy Yang) by pinfall	Singles match (Fusion – August 29)	5:30
8^{FT}	Brick Savage (with Josef Samael) defeated Terry "Flip" Sequoyah	Singles match (Fusion – August 29)	1:58
9^{FT}	Matt Riddle defeated Bishop Dyer by pinfall	Singles match (Fusion – August 29)	6:38
10	Templario (c) defeated Diego Hill by pinfall	Singles match for the MLW World Middleweight Championship	6:54
11	Lady Frost defeated Corinne Joy (with Jazzy Yang) by pinfall	Singles match	3:44
12	Big Damo (with Josef Samael) defeated Andrew Everett by pinfall	Singles match	3:33
13	Killer Kross (c) defeated Josh Bishop by technical submission	No Holds Barred match for the MLW World Heavyweight Championship	11:55
(c) / – the champion(s) heading into the match; FT / – the match was taped for a future broadcast of Fusion
