= Kings of Colosseum =

- Promotions: Major League Wrestling
- First event: Kings of Colosseum (2019)

Kings of Colosseum is a professional wrestling event produced by Major League Wrestling (MLW) that was first held in 2019.

The first three events served as television tapings for, and special episodes of, MLW Fusion. The first event aired as a special live episode of Fusion, while the second event was taped behind closed doors.

== Dates and venues ==
Aired live

#	Event	Date	City	Venue	Main event
1	Kings of Colosseum (2019)	July 6, 2019	Cicero, Illinois	Cicero Stadium	Tom Lawlor (c) vs. Jacob Fatu for the MLW World Heavyweight Championship
2	Kings of Colosseum (2021)	January 6, 2021	Orlando, Florida	GILT Nightclub	Alexander Hammerstone (c) vs. Mads Krügger for the MLW National Openweight Championship
3	Kings of Colosseum (2022)	May 13, 2022	Philadelphia, Pennsylvania	2300 Arena	Jacob Fatu vs. Mads Krügger in a Weapons of Mass Destruction match
4	Kings of Colosseum (2024)	January 6, 2024	Philadelphia, Pennsylvania	2300 Arena	Matt Riddle vs. Jacob Fatu in a Single Match
5	Kings of Colosseum (2025)	January 11, 2025	NYTEX Sports Centre	North Richland Hills, Texas	Satoshi Kojima (c) vs. Matt Riddle for the MLW World Heavyweight Championship
6	Kings of Colosseum (2026)	May 9, 2026	The Signal	Chattanooga, Tennessee	Killer Kross (c) vs. Josh Bishop in a No Holds Barred match for the MLW World Heavyweight Championship
