= Battle Riot IV =

2022 Major League Wrestling event

- Promotional poster of the event
- Promotion: Major League Wrestling
- Date: June 23, 2022 (aired November 3, 2022)
- City: New York City, New York
- Venue: Melrose Ballroom
- Attendance: 1,000

Event chronology
← Previous; Kings of Colosseum	Next → Fury Road

Battle Riot chronology
← Previous; III	Next → V

Battle Riot IV was a professional wrestling supercard event produced by Major League Wrestling (MLW) that took place on June 23, 2022 at the Melrose Ballroom in New York City. It was the fourth event under the Battle Riot chronology.

Matches from the event were taped for future MLW programming; the main card aired as a television special on November 3, 2022 on Pro Wrestling TV (PWTV), while the undercard would air as part of the new season of MLW Fusion that premiered on November 10.

== Production ==
=== Background ===
Other on-screen personnel
Role:	Name:
Commentators	Joe Dombrowski
Commentators	Rich Bocchini

Battle Riot is a recurring event that was established by MLW in 2018. The event is named after the Battle Riot match, a multi-competitor match type in which wrestlers are eliminated until one is left and declared winner. The match begins with a number of participants in the ring, who are then eliminated by either pin, submission, or going over the top rope and having both feet touch the venue floor. The declared winner of the Battle Riot match receives a future title shot for the MLW World Heavyweight Championship. On March 19, 2022, it was announced that Battle Riot IV would take place on June 23, 2022 at the Melrose Ballroom in New York City.

=== Storylines ===
The show feature several professional wrestling matches that resulted from scripted storylines, where wrestlers portrayed villains, heroes, or less distinguishable characters in the scripted events that built tension and culminated in a wrestling match or series of matches.

The main feature of the event is the titular Battle Riot match, a 40-man rumble rules-based match where the winner will receive a "golden ticket", which they can redeem for an MLW World Heavyweight Championship match anytime and anywhere. On the May 19 episode of Fusion, MLW announced the first five participants in the Battle Riot: Lince Dorado, Marshall Von Erich, Alex Kane, Calvin Tankman, and Killer Kross. The week after that, the field included EJ Nduka, Jacob Fatu, Mini Abismo Negro Budd Heavy, Matt Cross, and Ross Von Erich. Bandido, KC Navarro, Lance Anoa'i, Juicy Finau, and Richard Holliday were announced on June 2. On June 9, names announced included Real1, Davey Richards, Little Guido, Ace Romero, Savio Vega, and Los Maximos (Joel and Jose). O the June 16 Fusion, Mads Krügger, Myron Reed, Ken Broadway, Warhorse, and Microman entered the match. On June 23, Gangrel, Arez, Mr. Thomas, and Dr. Dax were added to the match.

Through MLW's "Open Door Policy", several free agents will be announced for the event. Scarlett Bordeaux was announced on June 2. On June 13, Dragon Gate's La Estrella was announced as a participant in the Battle Riot.

== Event ==
Cesar Duran opened the show by calling out MLW World Heavyweight Championship Alexander Hammerstone. After Hammerstone beat Duran's security, Richard Holliday appeared to laid him out with a chair. Duran then made a rematch between the two for later that night, but under falls count anywhere rules.

Both Bandido, Hammerstone's originally intended challenger, and Marshall and Ross Von Erich did not appear due to injuries.

The main event, the titular "Battle Riot", saw the returns of Mance Warner, after previous contractual issues that included him asking for his release in December 2020, among others. Former NXT superstar Parker Boudreaux also made his debut in the promotion during the match.

== Results ==
No.	Results	Stipulations	Times
1	Alexander Hammerstone defeated Los Aztecas (Uno and Cinco) (with Cesar Duran) by pinfall	2-on-1 Handicap match	0:38
2	KC Navarro defeated Mini Abismo Negro by pinfall	Singles match	4:04
3	Jacob Fatu defeated Real1 by disqualification	Singles match	2:01
4	Davey Richards defeated Alex Kane (c) (with Mr. Thomas) by pinfall	Singles match for the MLW National Openweight Championship	12:52
5	Scarlett Bordeaux defeated Clara Carreras by pinfall	Singles match	1:47
6	Alexander Hammerstone (c) defeated Richard Holliday (with Cesar Duran) via submission (Note: Initially, Bandido was scheduled to face Hammerstone for the title but pulled out due to an injury suffered at Triplemanía XXX on June 18, 2022.)	Falls Count Anywhere match for the MLW World Heavyweight Championship	21:55
7	Myron Reed (c) (with Mr. Thomas) defeated Arez, Lince Dorado and La Estrella by pinfall	Four-way match for the MLW World Middleweight Championship	6:54
8	The Samoan SWAT Team (Juicy Finau and Lance Anoa'i) (with Jacob Fatu) defeated Los Maximos (Joel and Jose) by pinfall (Note: Initially, The Samoan SWAT Team were scheduled to face The Von Erichs, but the latter team pulled out due to injury.)	Tag team match	3:14
9	Killer Kross (with Scarlett Bordeaux) defeated Matt Cross by pinfall	Singles match	4:38
10	Taya Valkyrie (c) defeated Brittany Blake via submission	Singles match for the MLW Women's Featherweight Championship	6:50
11	Jacob Fatu won by last eliminating Real1	40-man Battle Riot match for a future MLW World Heavyweight Championship match	48:52
(c) / – the champion(s) heading into the match

=== Battle Riot match entrances and eliminations ===
Draw	Entrant	Order	Eliminated by	Method of elimination	Elimination(s)
1	EJ Nduka	3	Arez and Lince Dorado	Over the top rope	2
2	Calvin Tankman	2	EJ Nduka	Over the top rope	0
3	Mr. Thomas	1	EJ Nduka	Over the top rope	0
4	Lince Dorado	12	Killer Kross	Over the top rope	1
5	Arez	6	Killer Kross	Over the top rope	1
6	Micro Man	8	Real1	Over the top rope	0
7	Mini Abismo Negro	7	Sami Callihan	Over the top rope	0
8	La Estrella	9	Sami Callihan	Over the top rope	0
9	KC Navarro	20	Rickey Shane Page	Over the top rope	0
10	Kim Chee	4	Joel Maximo	Submission	0
11	Joel Maximo	5	Killer Kross	Pinfall	1
12	Killer Kross	38	Jacob Fatu	Over the top rope	5
13	Sami Callihan	37	Jacob Fatu	Over the top rope	5
14	Real1	39	Jacob Fatu	Over the top rope	6
15	Gangrel	15	Killer Kross	Over the top rope	0
16	Kwang The Ninja	11	Killer Kross	Over the top rope	0
17	Budd Heavy	10	Real1	Over the top rope	0
18	Little Guido	14	Davey Richards	Submission	0
19	Jose Maximo	13	Homicide	Pinfall	0
20	Davey Richards	33	Real1 and Sami Callihan	Over the top rope	3
21	Lance Anoa'i	19	Real1	Over the top rope	1
22	Ken Broadway	16	Sami Callihan	Over the top rope	0
23	Homicide	17	Lance Anoa'i	Over the top rope	1
24	Rickey Shane Page	28	Mads Krügger	Over the top rope	1
25	Juicy Finau	24	Real1	Over the top rope	1
26	Los Azteca 80	18	Juicy Finau	Pinfall	0
27	Dr. Dax	21	Jacob Fatu	Pinfall	0
28	Jacob Fatu	–	Winner	–	8
29	Mads Krügger	35	Jacob Fatu	Over the top rope	4
30	Wil Maximo	22	Mads Krügger	Pinfall	0
31	Warhorse	27	Mads Krügger	Over the top rope	0
32	Myron Reed	29	Davey Richards	Over the top rope	0
33	Los Azteca 33	23	Jacob Fatu	Over the top rope	0
34	Los Azteca 22	25	Jacob Fatu	Over the top rope	0
35	Matt Cross	26	Jacob Fatu	Over the top rope	0
36	Mance Warner	34	Mads Krügger	Over the top rope	0
37	Alex Kane	30	Davey Richards	Over the top rope	0
38	Savio Vega	31	Real1	Over the top rope	0
39	Taya Valkyrie (Note: Valkyrie became the first female to enter the Battle Riot match.)	32	Parker Boudreaux	Over the top rope	0
40	Parker Boudreaux	36	Killer Kross and Sami Callihan	Over the top rope	1
