= Kings of Colosseum (2025) =

2025 Major League Wrestling event

- Promotional poster of the event
- Promotion: Major League Wrestling
- Date: January 11, 2025
- City: North Richland Hills, Texas
- Venue: NYTEX Sports Centre
- Attendance: 2,400

Event chronology
← Previous; Eric Bischoff's One Shot	Next → SuperFight 6

Kings of Colosseum chronology
← Previous; 2024	Next → 2026

Kings of Colosseum (2025) was a professional wrestling live streaming event produced by Major League Wrestling (MLW). It took place on January 11, 2025, at the NYTEX Sports Centre in North Richland Hills, Texas. It was the fifth event under the Kings of Colosseum chronology. The event streamed live on MLW's YouTube channel, with additional matches being taped for the "Reloaded" special, which aired on January 25 on Bein Sports USA and YouTube.

== Production ==
=== Background ===
Kings of Colosseum is a reoccurring professional wrestling supercard event produced by MLW that was first held on July 6, 2019. The first event would air live as a special episode of MLW's weekly television series, Fusion.

On September 25, 2024, MLW announced that Kings of Colosseum would take place on January 11, 2025, at the NYTEX Sports Centre in North Richland Hills, Texas.

=== Storylines ===
The card will consist of matches that result from scripted storylines, where wrestlers portray villains, heroes, or less distinguishable characters in scripted events that built tension and culminated in a wrestling match or series of matches, with results predetermined by MLW's writers. Storylines were played out on MLW Fusion, and the league's social media platforms.

At Lucha Apocalypto, Místico successfully defended the MLW World Middleweight Championship against Titán and Averno, in a three-way match. However, almost immediately after, he was attacked by Bárbaro Cavernario, who pummeled and even unmasked the champion. Cavernario then challenged Místico to an MLW World Middleweight Championship match at Kings of Colosseum, which Místico accepted. On December 18, MLW, via their website, officially announced the match as a two out of three falls match, the traditional stipulation in lucha libre, set for the taping portion of Kings of Colosseum

Matt Riddle won the Battle Riot match to earn a "golden ticket" he could invoke for an MLW World Heavyweight Championship match at the time and place of his choosing. Since then, Riddle had allied with world champion Satoshi Kojima as they and others faced the likes of the World Titan Federation and Contra Unit; all the while defending his title opportunity against the likes of Sami Callihan, Tom Lawlor, and Donovan Dijak. At Slaughterhouse, after Riddle saved Kojima from an attack by Contra Unit, Riddle declared that he would invoke his golden ticket to challenge Kojima at Kings of Colosseum.

At Eric Bischoff's One Shot, executive produce Eric Bischoff announced a match of his creation for Kings of Colosseum – the "Gravity Gamble match". In this ladder match, five briefcases are suspended above the ring, with one containing a "golden contract" for a future MLW World Heavyweight Championship match; the other four either being empty or holding weapons. Mads Krule Krügger, Akira, Brett Ryan Gosselin, MLW National Openweight Champion Matthew Justice, and Trevor Lee were named as the participants. On January 3, MLW announced that Lee would be replaced by New Japan Pro-Wrestling (NJPW) star Kevin Knight for unspecified reasons.

In the ongoing rivalry between Contra Unit's Janai Kai and Azteca Lucha's Delmi Exo over the MLW World Women's Featherweight Championship, the champion Kai attacked the latter after her match at Slaughterhouse, ending with Kai cutting Exo's hair. A few weeks later at Eric Bischoff's One Shot, after Exo was victorious in another match, she put a challenge out to Kai for a Title vs. Hair match for the MLW World Women's Featherweight Championship. MLW later announced that the match had been officially made for Kings of Colosseum.

At Slaughterhouse, Kenta defeated Paul London only to be immediately attacked by Donovan Dijak; the assault kayfabe injuring Kenta and keeping him from competing in MLW for the rest of 2024. As a result, on December 16, MLW announced that Kenta would face off with Dijak at Kings of Colosseum.

Towards the end of Eric Bischoff's One Shot, executive producer Bischoff was seen on the phone while holding what looked to be company documents. With many questions surrounding the incident, MLW would announce that Bischoff would appear via satellite at Kings of Colosseum to address his new plans for the promotion.

== Results ==
Kings of Colosseum
No.	Results	Stipulations	Times
1	Mads Krule Krügger defeated Akira, Brett Ryan Gosselin, Matthew Justice and Mr. Thomas (Note: Kevin Knight was originally in the match, however he was attacked by The Andersons (C.W. Anderson and Brock Anderson) while making his entrance. Mr. Thomas subsequently took his place.)	Gravity Gamble match for an MLW World Heavyweight Championship match contract	19:24
2	Los Guerreros de la Atlantida (Atlantis and Atlantis Jr.) defeated Los Divinos Laguneros (Blue Panther and Dark Panther) by pinfall	Tag team match	9:07
3	Delmi Exo defeated Janai Kai (c) by pinfall	Title vs. Hair match for the MLW World Women's Featherweight Championship	7:10
4	Donovan Dijak (with Saint Laurent) defeated Kenta by pinfall	Singles match	9:27
5	Averno defeated Máscara Dorada and Esfinge by submission	Three-way match	11:45
6	Matt Riddle defeated Satoshi Kojima (c) by pinfall	Singles match for the MLW World Heavyweight Championship	10:43
(c) / – the champion(s) heading into the match

Reloaded (January 25)
No.	Results	Stipulations	Times
1	Neón defeated Virus by pinfall	Singles match	7:42
2	Okumura defeated Dark Panther by pinfall	Singles match	6:03
3	Bobby Fish defeated Ariel Dominguez by submission	Singles match	2:34
4	The Andersons (Brock Anderson and C. W. Anderson) defeated Paul London and Paul Walter Hauser by pinfall	Texas Tornado match	7:22
5	Persephone defeated Alejandra Quintanilla by pinfall	Singles match	5:17
6	Tom Lawlor defeated Minoru Suzuki by pinfall	Singles match	6:13
7	Místico (c) defeated Bárbaro Cavernario 2–1	Two out of three falls match for the MLW World Middleweight Championship	15:46
(c) / – the champion(s) heading into the match
