= Fury Road (2019) =

2019 Major League Wrestling event

- Promotion: Major League Wrestling
- Date: June 1, 2019
- City: Waukesha, Wisconsin
- Venue: Waukesha County Expo Center
- Attendance: 400-500

Event chronology
← Previous; Battle Riot II	Next → Kings of Colosseum

Fury Road chronology
← Previous; 2018	Next → 2022

MLW Fusion special episodes chronology
← Previous; Battle Riot II	Next → Kings of Colosseum

Fury Road (2019) was a supercard event produced by Major League Wrestling (MLW), which took place on June 1, 2019 at the Waukesha County Expo Center in Waukesha, Wisconsin. The event aired as a live special episode of MLW's television program, Fusion, on beIN Sports. It was the second event under the Fury Road chronology.

Fifteen matches were contested on the card, with three matches airing live while the other matches being taped for future episodes of Fusion. On the live broadcast of Fury Road, Teddy Hart successfully defended the World Middleweight Championship against Jimmy Havoc in the main event. On the undercard, Alexander Hammerstone defeated Brian Pillman Jr. in the finals of a four-man tournament to become the inaugural National Openweight Champion and Gringo Loco defeated Myron Reed in a middleweight match.

== Production ==
=== Background ===
On February 25, 2019, MLW.com announced that Major League Wrestling would be holding its first-ever event in Wisconsin on June 1. It was announced that Fury Road would take place at the Waukesha County Expo Center in Waukesha, Wisconsin. MLW previously held an event Fury Road as a television taping for Fusion in 2018. However, on May 14, MLW announced that the 2019 edition of Fury Road would be a live television special to be aired on beIN Sports.

=== Storylines ===
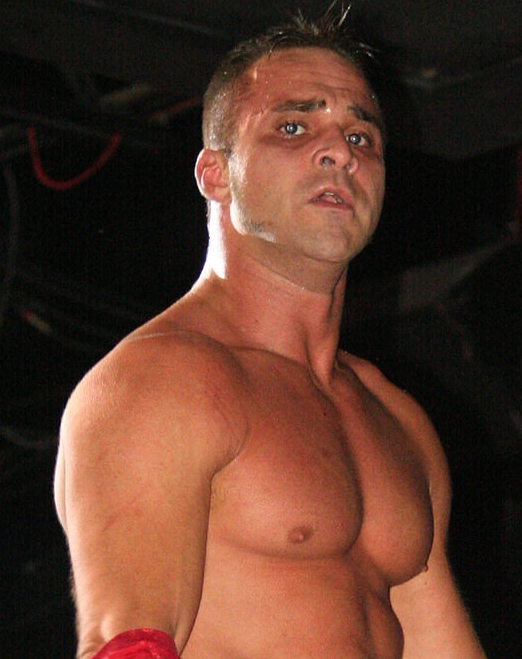
Teddy Hart defended the MLW World Middleweight Championship against Jimmy Havoc in the main event of Fury Road.

The card consisted of matches that resulted from scripted storylines, where wrestlers portrayed villains, heroes, or less distinguishable characters in scripted events that built tension and culminated in a wrestling match or series of matches, with results predetermined by MLW's writers. Storylines were played out on MLW's television program Fusion.

On April 18, 2019, MLW.com announced that MLW was introducing a new title called the National Openweight Championship. It was announced that a four-man tournament would take place to determine the inaugural champion and the tournament final would take place at Fury Road. Alexander Hammerstone defeated Gringo Loco in the first semi-final on the May 11 episode of Fusion and Brian Pillman Jr. defeated Rich Swann in the second semi-final on the May 18 episode of Fusion, thus setting up the tournament final between Pillman and Hammerstone to crown the inaugural champion at Fury Road, which would also continue the ongoing feud between The Hart Foundation and The Dynasty, Pillman and Hammerstone's respective stables.

On May 13, it was announced that Teddy Hart would defend the World Middleweight Championship against Jimmy Havoc at Fury Road.

On May 20, it was announced that Rey Horus would take on Myron Reed in a middleweight match at Fury Road.

== Event ==
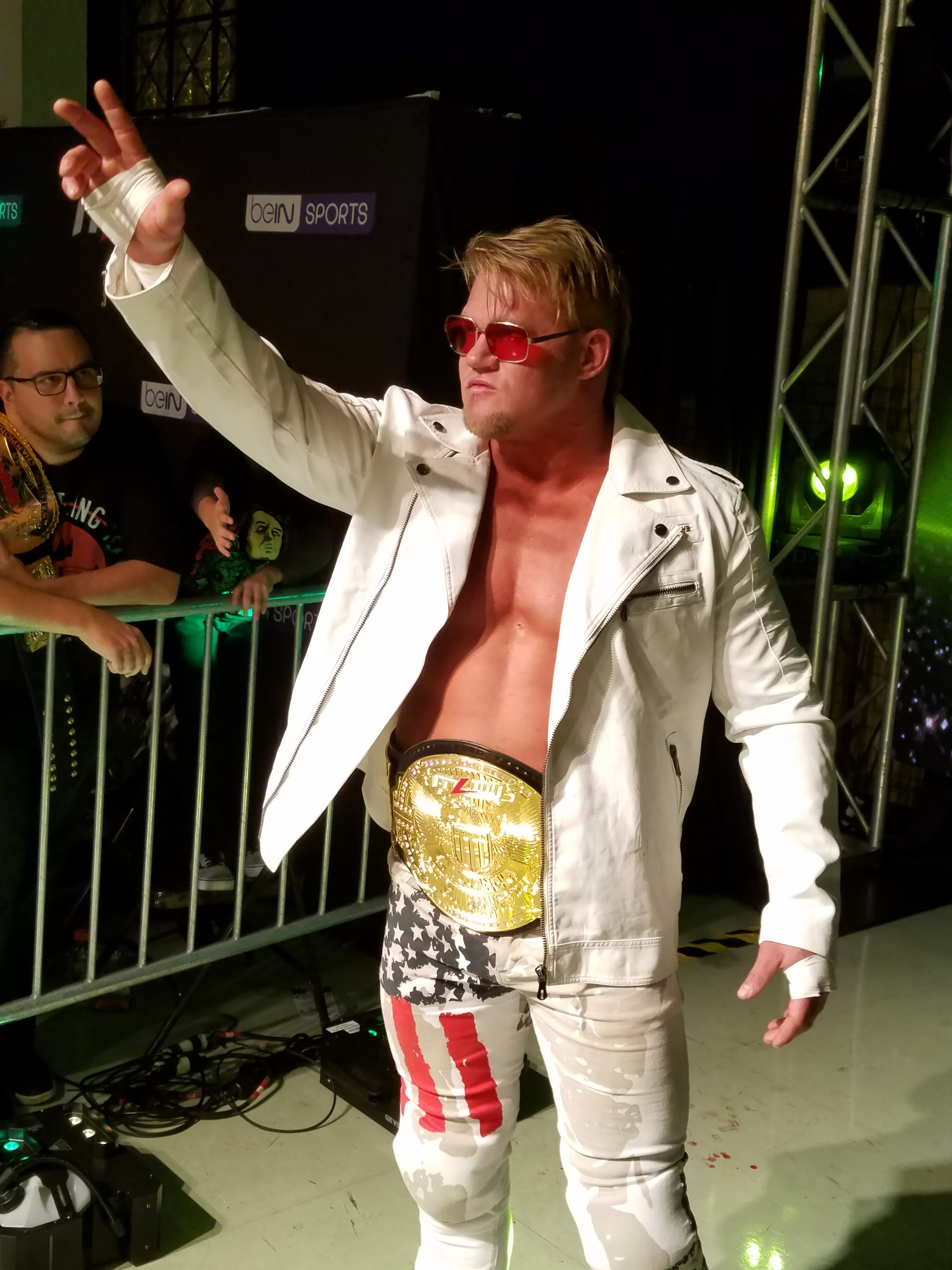
Alexander Hammerstone won a four-man tournament to become the inaugural National Openweight Champion at Fury Road.

=== Preliminary matches ===
The event opened with a middleweight match between Gringo Loco and Myron Reed. Reed grabbed the ropes for leverage to pin Loco but the referee stopped the pinfall count due to illegal activity which led to Reed arguing with the referee. The distraction allowed Loco to hit a kneeling reverse piledriver to Reed for the win. Reed then hit Loco with brass knuckles after the match.

Next, the tournament final to crown the inaugural National Openweight Champion took place between Brian Pillman Jr. and Alexander Hammerstone. Hammerstone moved out of the way of a diving splash by Pillman and nailed a Nightmare Pendulum for the win thus becoming the first-ever National Openweight Champion.

After the match, Contra Unit attacked the World Heavyweight Champion Tom Lawlor in the parking lot and kidnapped him and then cut off his hair.

=== Main event match ===
In the main event, Teddy Hart defended the World Middleweight Championship against Jimmy Havoc. Hart avoided an Acid Rainmaker by Havoc and nailed a Canadian Destroyer to Havoc which was followed by a hammerlock DDT for the win to retain the title. After the match, The Dynasty attacked Hart but Hart Foundation made the save.

== Results ==
No.	Results	Stipulations
1	Jordan Oliver defeated Isaias Velázquez	Singles match
2	Low Ki defeated Tom Coffey	Singles match
3	Air Wolf defeated Ace Austin	Singles match
4	Tom Lawlor and The Von Erichs (Marshall and Ross) defeated Contra Unit (Simon Gotch, Jacob Fatu and Josef Samael)	Tornado tag team match
5	Gringo Loco defeated Myron Reed	Singles match
6	Alexander Hammerstone defeated Brian Pillman Jr.	Singles match Tournament final for the new MLW National Openweight Championship
7	Teddy Hart (c) defeated Jimmy Havoc	Singles match for the MLW World Middleweight Championship
8	Flamita defeated Rey Horus	Singles match
9	Davey Boy Smith Jr. defeated Maxwell Jacob Friedman	Singles match
10	Jacob Fatu defeated Sam Black and Ariel Dominguez	Handicap match
11	Richard Holliday defeated Kotto Brazil	Singles match
12	Josef Samael defeated Tom Lawlor by disqualification	Singles match
13	Low Ki defeated Ricky Martinez	Singles match
14	Austin Aries defeated Adam Brooks	Singles match
15	Mance Warner defeated Sami Callihan	Loser Leaves MLW Falls Count Anywhere match
(c) / – the champion(s) heading into the match

=== Tournament brackets ===
Semifinals
Fusion	Alexander Hammerstone	Pin
5/11	Gringo Loco
Fusion	Brian Pillman Jr.	Pin
5/18	Rich Swann

Final
Fury Road	Alexander Hammerstone	Pin
6/1	Brian Pillman Jr.
