= Mads Krule Krügger =

American professional wrestler

Mads Krügger
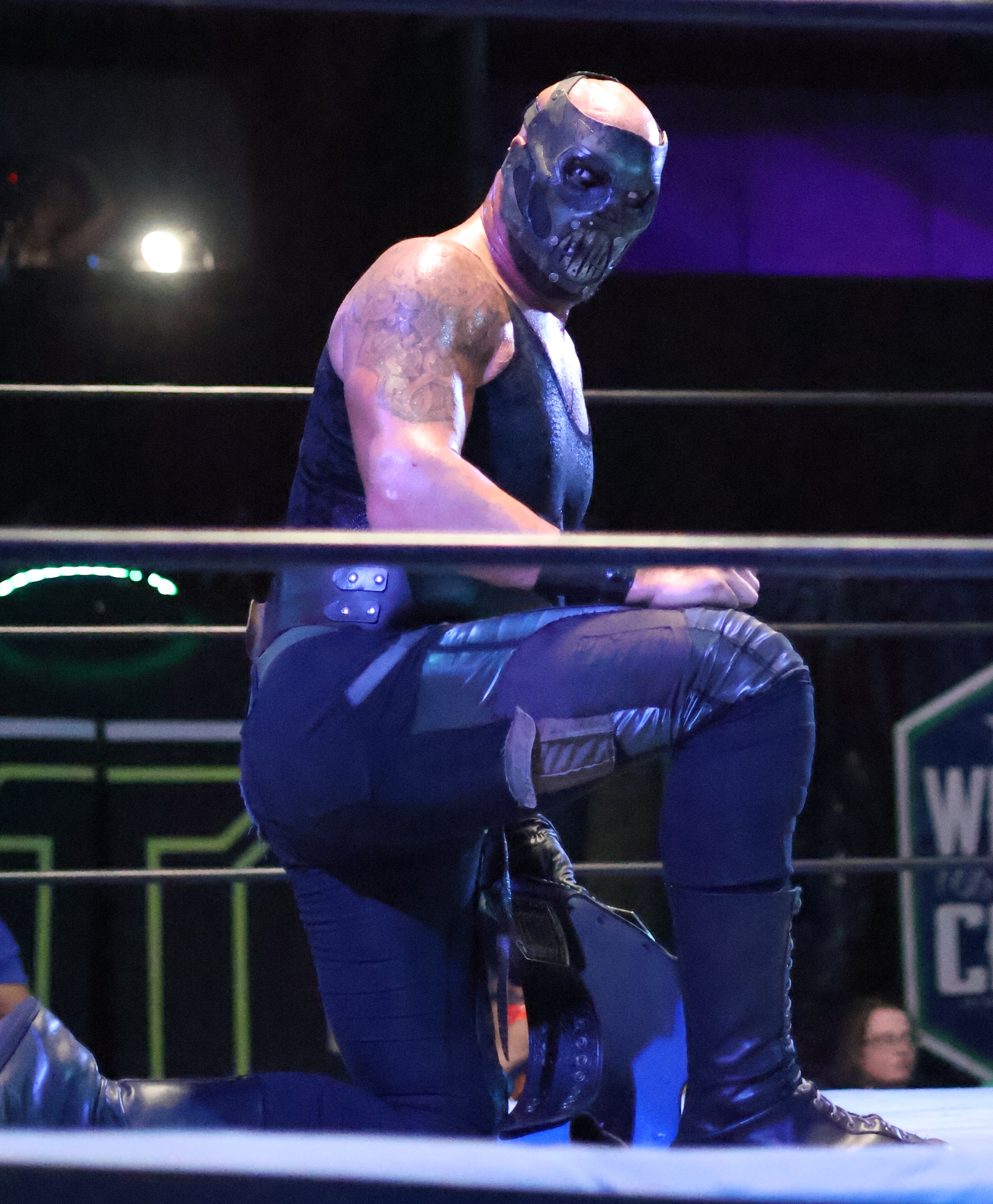
- Krügger in September 2024

Personal information
- Born: Matthew Waters; August 22, 1985 (age 41) Lyons, Georgia, United States

Professional wrestling career
- Ring name(s): Grogan; Krule; Logan Creed; Mads Krügger; Mads Krule Krügger
- Billed height: 6 ft 8 in (2.03 m)
- Billed weight: 317 lb (144 kg)
- Trained by: Shawn Hunter
- Debut: January 20, 2012

Matthew Waters (born August 22, 1985), better known by the ring name Mads Krügger, is an American professional wrestler and actor. He performs on the independent circuit under the ring name Krule. He is best known for his time in Major League Wrestling (MLW), where he is a former one-time MLW World Heavyweight Champion and the former leader of Contra Unit.

Krügger's first national exposure came when he signed with MLW in 2019 as The Dynasty's monster bodyguard Grogan. However, he soon left The Dynasty and changed his ring name to Logan Creed. He was repackaged in the fall of 2020 as Contra Unit's fifth member "The Black Hand of Contra" Mads Krügger. He departed MLW in 2023, but returned in 2024.

== Professional wrestling career ==
=== Independent circuit (2012–present) ===
Matthew Waters was trained by Shawn Hunter and made his professional wrestling debut on January 20, 2012, under the ring name Logan Creed by teaming with Mike Pain as No Remorse at an All-Star Wrestling Network (AWN) event Friday Night Adrenaline by defeating The Monsters of Destruction. Creed became a mainstay in the Georgia independent circuit. Creed won his first professional wrestling championship on May 10, 2014, by defeating Cody Hall for the Southern Fried Championship Wrestling (SFCW) Heavyweight Championship. He lost the title to Luke Gallows on June 14. On July 18, 2015, Creed teamed with Drew Adler to defeat Trinity (Big Andy and Chris Nelms) to capture the SFCW Tag Team Championship. Creed and Adler lost the titles to The Beautiful Bald Besties (Michael Stevens and Zac Edwards) at SFCW's More Bang For Your Buck event on August 15. At Shocktober, Creed won an eight-man battle royal to win the vacant SFCW Heavyweight Championship for the second time. Creed successfully defended the title against former tag team partner Drew Adler in a ladder match at November Rulz before losing the title to Adler in a no disqualification match at Fan Appreciation Night on January 2, 2016.

On May 7, Creed defeated Zac Edwards to win the SFCW Monroe City Championship. At Last Chance, Creed and Odinson defeated Gunner Miller and Troy Hunt to become the No. 1 contenders for the SFCW Tag Team Championship. Creed and Odinson defeated Beautiful Bald Besties to win the Tag Team Championship at Shinding III. Creed and Odinson successfully defended the titles against Big F'N Deal (Brian Blaze and Geter) at Firecracker Fights. Creed lost the Monroe City Championship to Trevor Aeon at Macon Mayhem. The tag team titles were vacated later that year. In the summer of 2016, Creed formed a faction with Kyle Matthews, Merica Strong, Slim J and Tommy Too Much called The Kingsmen.

On December 30, Creed defeated Drew Adler in a street fight to win the AWN Heavyweight Championship. On January 21, 2017, Creed teamed with The Kingsmen teammate Tommy Too Much to defeat Trending Now (Ace Haven and Charles Zanders) to win the PWA Tag Team Championship. On February 18, Creed, Matthews and Tommy took on Beautiful Bald Besties and the PWA Heritage Champion Shane Noles in a six-man tag team match, where Noles' Heritage Championship and Kingsmen's Tag Team Championship were on the line. Kingsmen lost the match, losing the Tag Team Championship to Beautiful Bald Besties as a result. On March 18, Kingsmen regained the Tag Team Championship when Creed and Matthews defeated Beautiful Bald Besties. At PWA's 9th Anniversary Show, Kingsmen lost all of their titles as Creed and Matthews lost the Tag Team Championship, Mr. O'Hagan lost the No Limits Championship and Tommy lost the Heritage Championship to The Reckoning (Billy Buck, Charles Zanders, Kevin Blue and Schaff) in a Survivor Games match.

At an Anarchy Wrestling event on January 27, 2018, Creed defeated Geter in a lumberjack match to become the No. 1 contender for the Anarchy Triple Crown Championship. Creed received his title shot against Gunner Miller on February 24, where Miller retained the title via disqualification. This led to a no disqualification rematch for the title at Hardcore Hell XX, which Creed won. Creed successfully defended the title against Cyrus the Destroyer in a last man standing match on June 23, Ike Kross on September 8 and Mikael Judas and Stryknyn in a three-way match at Fright Night. At Halloween Hell, Creed lost the AWN Heavyweight Championship to Bill the Butcher. At Hardcore Hell pay-per-view on April 13, 2019, Creed defended the Anarchy Triple Crown Championship against the Anarchy Landmark Heritage Champion Stryknyn, Jacob Ashworth and Sal Rinauro in a steel cage match, thus winning the Landmark Heritage Championship while retaining the Triple Crown Championship. Creed lost the title to Will Kaution in a six-way match on May 11. On May 25, Creed lost the Triple Crown Championship to Griff Garrison.

On November 28, Creed won a tournament by defeating Alan Angels in the first round, Griff Garrison in the semi-final and Josey Quinn in the final to win the third SFCW Heavyweight Championship at Thanksgiving Day Tournament. At Logan vs. Judas, Creed lost the title to Mikael Judas in a last man standing match on February 15, 2020. The following month, Creed defeated Mike Pain to win the WrestleMerica Heavyweight Championship at March Melee. Creed lost the title to Tyson Dean in a three-way match, also involving Mike Pain in a three-way match on August 8. At the Jingle Brawl pay-per-view on December 19, Creed teamed with Francisco Ciatso to defeat Da House Of Payne (Hakim Ali and Nick Payne) and The Modern Day Sharpshooters (James Creed and Maxx Blaylock) in a three-way match at the North American Wrestling Alliance (NAWA) Tag Team Championship.

=== Major League Wrestling ===
==== The Dynasty (2019–2020) ====
Waters made his Major League Wrestling (MLW) debut at the Blood and Thunder event on November 9, 2019. He made his televised debut in MLW on the December 7 episode of Fusion as Alexander Hammerstone's newest gift to The Dynasty under the ring name Grogan as a participant in a battle royal. He won the battle royal by lastly eliminating Timothy Thatcher. Grogan only appeared once beside Dynasty member MJF in a backstage interview with Alicia Atout on the January 25 episode of Fusion. On the February 15 episode of Fusion, Grogan betrayed Dynasty by allowing Dynasty's rival Mance Warner entry into the arena after Warner bribed Grogan by offering him beers and a date with a dancer. This allowed Warner to interfere and prevent Hammerstone from helping MJF and Richard Holliday in winning the MLW World Tag Team Championship from Marshall and Ross Von Erich. This led to Grogan officially leaving Dynasty and turning into a fan favorite as he reverted to his original ring name Logan Creed.

Creed competed in his first singles match on the following week's episode of Fusion by defeating enhancement talent Moonshine Mantell. On the February 29 episode of Fusion, Creed teamed with Mance Warner and Savio Vega against Dynasty's Alexander Hammerstone, Gino Medina and Richard Holliday in a six-man tag team match, which Creed's team lost. This was his last match with MLW before the company went on hiatus due to the COVID-19 pandemic.

==== Contra Unit (2020–2023) ====
Creed made his return to MLW as a masked monster on the November 18 episode of Fusion by attacking Alexander Hammerstone after Hammerstone appeared at ringside to confront Jacob Fatu after Fatu had retained the MLW World Heavyweight Championship against Davey Boy Smith Jr. Confirmed as "The Black Hand of Contra", the fifth new member of Fatu's faction Contra Unit, his ring name was later revealed to be Mads Krügger. On the December 2 episode of Fusion, Krügger competed in his first match by defeating Ariel Dominguez. On the December 16 episode of Fusion, Krügger defeated two local wrestlers in a handicap match. He was later engaged in a brawl with Hammerstone, setting up a match between the two for Hammerstone's National Openweight Championship at Kings of Colosseum. Being at the Contra Unit, he was the brawn needed by Josef Samael to shield Fatu, but that ended when Fatu lost the Heavyweight title to Alex Hammerstone. That caused tension between Contra members, which went to a breaking point after War Chamber, which Fatu and him brawled after losing the main event. The duo feuded, with vignettes of him demanding that he wants Fatu fall by his hands, exchanging victories on each other, culminating in the Weapons of Mass Destruction match, which he was "drenched in radioactive waste", and Jacob unmasking him, ending the feud.

After the match, vignettes of him injured and horribly suffering due to the toxin exposure appeared on MLW programming. At the start of 2023, he was released by MLW.

==== Return to MLW (2024–2026) ====
At SuperFight on January 3, 2024, Krügger made his return to MLW, along with Contra Unit's Sentai Death Squad, attacking Jacob Fatu after his match with Yuji Nagata and hitting him with a Baklei bottle.

On January 11, 2025, at Kings of Colosseum, Krügger defeated Matthew Justice, Mr. Thomas, Brett Ryan Gosselin and Akira to win the Gravity Gramble contract for a future MLW World Heavyweight Championship match at any time of his choosing. On April 5 at Battle Riot VII, Krügger entered the Battle Riot match but was eliminated by Rob Van Dam and eventual winner Matt Riddle respectively, thus failing to win the MLW World Heavyweight Championship in the process. At War Chamber on June 9, Krügger and Babathunder defeated Filthy Bros (Matt Riddle and Tom Lawlor) in a Chicago Street Fight. At Fightland on September 14, Krügger defeated previous champion Riddle and Donovan Dijak to win the MLW World Heavyweight Championship after cashing his Gravity Gramble contract. On December 29, Krügger left Contra Unit.

On May 21, 2026, Mike Johnson of PWInsider reported that Krügger had departed MLW.

== Championships and accomplishments ==
- All-Star Wrestling Network
  - AWN Heavyweight Championship (1 time)
- Anarchy Wrestling
  - Anarchy Landmark Heritage Championship (1 time)
  - Anarchy Triple Crown Championship (1 time)
- Combat 1 Wrestling
  - Combat 1 World Championship (1 time)
- IndependentWrestling.TV
  - Undisputed IWTV Independent Wrestling World Championship (3 times)
- Scenic City Invitational
  - Scenic City Rumble (2025)
- Intense Wrestling Entertainment
  - IWE Heavyweight Championship (1 time)
- Major League Wrestling
  - MLW World Heavyweight Championship (1 time)
- National Wrestling Alliance
  - NWA Georgia Heavyweight Championship (1 time)
- North American Wrestling Alliance
  - NAWA Tag Team Championship (1 time) – with Francisco Ciatso
- Old School Championship Wrestling
  - OSCW Tag Team Championship (1 time) – with Drew Adler
- Peachstate Wrestling Alliance
  - PWA Tag Team Championship (2 times) – with Tommy Too Much (1) and Kyle Matthews (1)
- Premier Wrestling Federation
  - PWF Undisputed Championship (1 time)
- Pro Wrestling Illustrated
  - Ranked No. 39 of the top 500 singles wrestlers in the PWI 500 in 2024
- Southern Fried Championship Wrestling
  - SFCW Heavyweight Championship (3 times)
  - SFCW Georgia Heavyweight Championship (1 time)
  - SFCW Monroe City Championship (1 time)
  - SFCW Tag Team Championship (1 time) – with Drew Adler
- Southern Honor Wrestling
  - SHW Championship (2 times)
- The Wrestling Revolver
  - Revolver World Championship (1 time)
  - Revolver World Tag Team Championship (2 times) – with Dreadknot (2), Alan Angels (1)
- WrestleMerica
  - WrestleMerica Heavyweight Championship (1 time)
