= Kings of Colosseum (2019) =

2019 Major League Wrestling professional wrestling event

- Promotion: Major League Wrestling
- Date: July 6, 2019
- City: Cicero, Illinois
- Venue: Cicero Stadium

Event chronology
| ← Previous; Fury Road | Next → Never Say Never |

Kings of Colosseum chronology
| ← Previous; First | Next → 2021 |

MLW Fusion special episodes chronology
| ← Previous; Fury Road | Next → War Chamber |

Kings of Colosseum (2019) was a professional wrestling supercard event produced by Major League Wrestling, which took place on July 6, 2019, at the Cicero Stadium in Cicero, Illinois. It was the first event under the Kings of Colosseum chronology. The event aired live as a two-hour special episode of MLW's weekly television series, Fusion, on beIN Sports.

Fourteen matches were taped at the event, with three matches airing live, and the other eleven matches shown on later episodes of Fusion. In the main event of the live broadcast, Jacob Fatu defeated Tom Lawlor to win the MLW World Heavyweight Championship. In other matches on the undercard, Alexander Hammerstone retained the MLW National Openweight Championship against Kotto Brazil and Myron Reed took on Rey Horus.

== Production ==
=== Background ===
On February 18, 2019, MLW.com announced that it would be holding an event in Chicago at the Cicero Stadium in Cicero, Illinois on July 6. The event would be titled Kings of Colosseum. It was announced that the event would air as a special episode of Fusion on beIN Sports.

=== Storylines ===
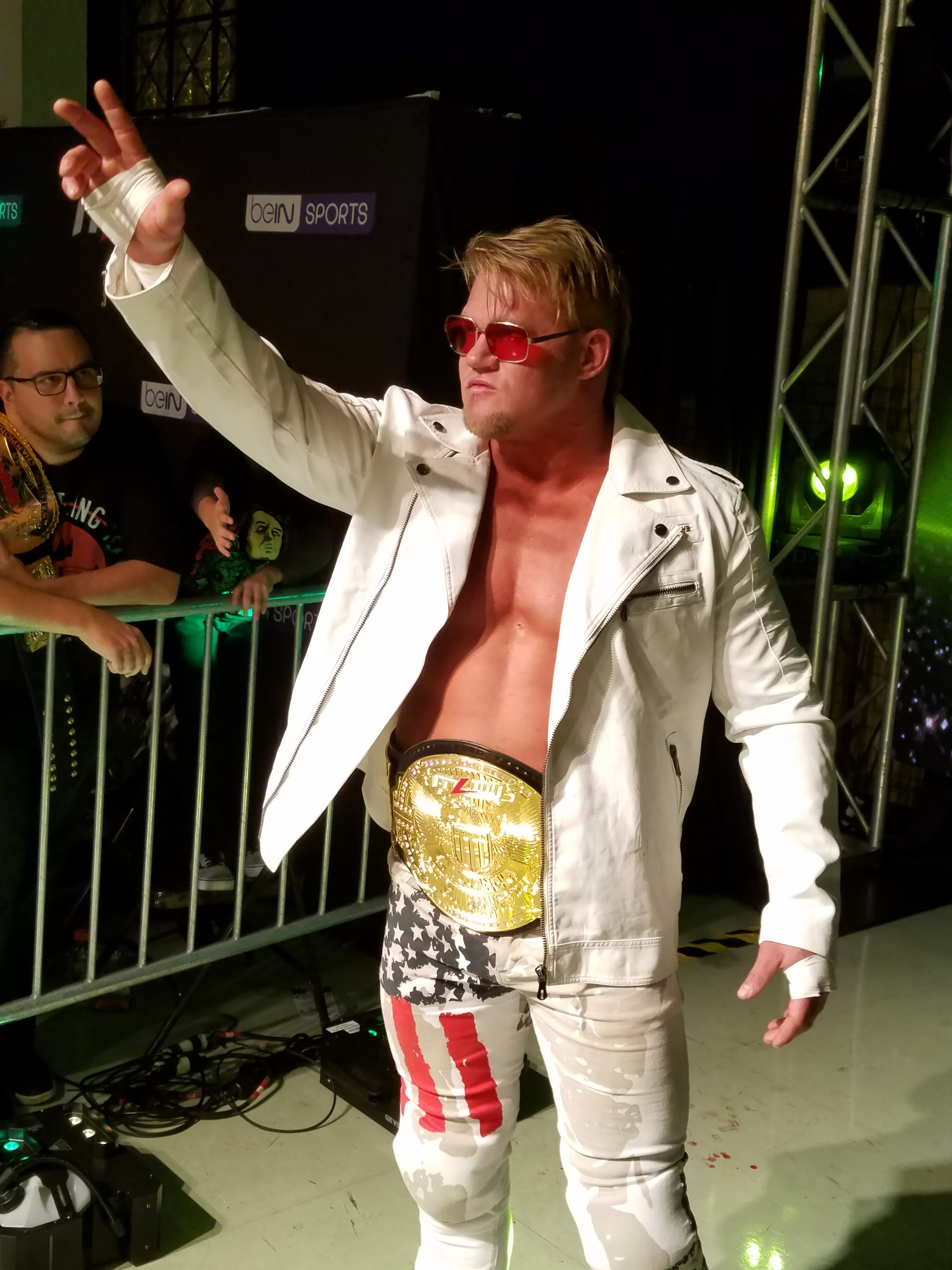
Alexander Hammerstone defended the MLW National Openweight Championship in a Star Sprangled Hammer Challenge at Kings of Colosseum.

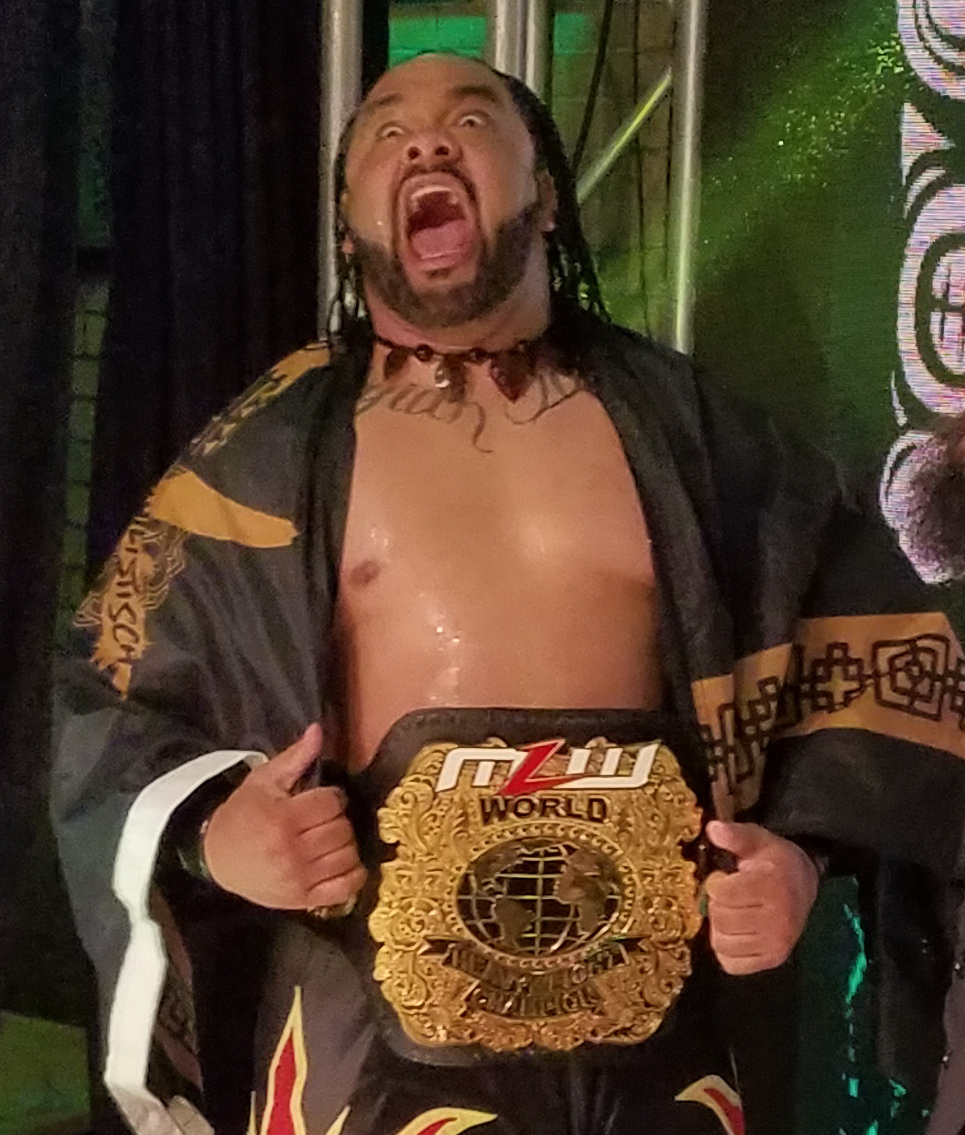
Jacob Fatu won the MLW World Heavyweight Championship in the main event of Kings of Colosseum.

The card consisted of matches that resulted from scripted storylines, where wrestlers portrayed villains, heroes, or less distinguishable characters in scripted events that built tension and culminated in a wrestling match or series of matches, with results predetermined by MLW's writers. Storylines were played out on MLW's television program Fusion.

At Intimidation Games, Tom Lawlor successfully defended the MLW World Heavyweight Championship against Low Ki in a steel cage match and then Lawlor's former Team Filthy teammate Simon Gotch joined forces with the team of newcomers Jacob Fatu and Josef Samael to attack Lawlor after the match and formed a faction known as Contra Unit. At Battle Riot II, Contra Unit attacked Lawlor again during an interview after his successful title defense against Jimmy Havoc. On the April 20 episode of Fusion, Lawlor challenged Contra Unit to a match. Contra Unit attacked Lawlor again on numerous occasions throughout the next few weeks. On the June 8 episode of Fusion, it was announced that Lawlor would defend the World Heavyweight Championship against Contra Unit member Jacob Fatu at Kings of Colosseum.

On June 29, MLW.com announced that a middleweight match would take place between Rey Horus and Myron Reed at Kings of Colosseum.

On July 2, it was announced that Alexander Hammerstone would defend the National Openweight Championship in a Star Sprangled Hammer Challenge at Kings of Colosseum.

== Event ==
=== Preliminary matches ===
The opening match of the event featured Alexander Hammerstone issued an open challenge, putting the National Openweight Championship on the line. Kotto Brazil answered the challenge to begin the match. Hammerstone executed a superplex and a Nightmare Pendulum on Brazil to retain the title. After the match, Hammerstone's The Dynasty teammate Maxwell Jacob Friedman issued a challenge to The Hart Foundation for the World Tag Team Championship.

Next, Myron Reed took on Rey Horus in a middleweight match. Reed's ally Jordan Oliver distracted Horus enough to allow Reed to execute a Louisville Slugger on Horus for the win.

=== Main event match ===
In the main event, Tom Lawlor defended the World Heavyweight Championship against Contra Unit member Jacob Fatu. Near the end of the match, Lawlor avoided a moonsault by Fatu and hit him with some strikes but Fatu superkicked Lawlor and then nailed a pop-up Samoan drop and a double jump moonsault to pin him to win the World Heavyweight Championship.

== Aftermath ==
Dynasty received their title shot against Hart Foundation in a ladder match for the World Tag Team Championship on the July 13 episode of Fusion, which Dynasty won.

Tom Lawlor received his rematch for the MLW World Heavyweight Championship against Jacob Fatu on the August 31 episode of Fusion, where Fatu retained the title with the help of his Contra Unit teammates and then Lawlor was assaulted by Contra Unit after the match until Low Ki and The Von Erichs (Ross Von Erich and Marshall Von Erich) made the save for Lawlor. This led to a War Chamber match pitting Von Erichs, Lawlor and Low Ki against Contra Unit at War Chamber, which Team Von Erichs won.

== Results ==
| No. | Results | Stipulations |
|---|---|---|
| 1^{FT} | Ikuro Kwon defeated Isaias Velázquez | Singles match |
| 2^{FT} | Alexander Hammerstone (c) defeated Davey Boy Smith Jr. via disqualification | Singles match for the MLW National Openweight Championship |
| 3^{FT} | Gringo Loco defeated Zenshi | Singles match |
| 4^{FT} | Ace Austin defeated Air Wolf | Singles match |
| 5^{FT} | L. A. Park and El Hijo de L.A. Park (with Salina de la Renta) defeated Dr. Wagner Jr. and El Hijo del Dr. Wagner Jr. | Tag team match |
| 6^{FT} | Low Ki defeated Ariel Dominguez via referee stoppage | Singles match |
| 7^{FT} | The Von Erichs (Ross Von Erich and Marshall Von Erich) defeated Contra Unit (Josef Samael and Simon Gotch) | Tornado tag team match |
| 8 | Alexander Hammerstone (c) defeated Kotto Brazil | Singles match for the MLW National Openweight Championship |
| 9 | Myron Reed (with Jordan Oliver) defeated Rey Horus | Singles match |
| 10 | Jacob Fatu (with Josef Samael) defeated Tom Lawlor (c) | Singles match for the MLW World Heavyweight Championship |
| 11^{FT} | Bestia 666 defeated Mance Warner | Mexican Death Match |
| 12^{FT} | Jordan Oliver defeated Gringo Loco | Singles match |
| 13^{FT} | The Dynasty (Maxwell Jacob Friedman and Richard Holliday) defeated The Hart Foundation (Teddy Hart and Brian Pillman Jr.) (c) | Ladder match for the MLW World Tag Team Championship |
| 14^{FT} | Low Ki defeated Ricky Martinez | Singles match |
(c) / – the champion(s) heading into the match; FT / – the match was taped for a future broadcast of Fusion

== See also ==
- 2019 in professional wrestling
- List of Major League Wrestling events
