= MLW World Women's Featherweight Championship =

Wrestling championship by promotion Major League Wrestling

- The current championship belt

Details
- Promotion: Major League Wrestling (MLW)
- Date established: July 7, 2021
- Current champion: Masha
- Date won: September 12, 2026

Other names
- MLW Women's Featherweight Championship (2021–2022); MLW World Women's Featherweight Championship (2022–present)
Statistics
- First champion: Taya Valkyrie
- Most reigns: Delmi Exo (2)
- Longest reign: Janai Kai (455 days)
- Shortest reign: Delmi Exo (2nd reign, 84 days)
- Oldest champion: Taya Valkyrie (38 years, 264 days)
- Youngest champion: Masha Slamovich (28 years, 86 days)
- Heaviest champion: Taya Valkyrie (145 lb (66 kg))
- Lightest champion: Janai Kai (126 lb (57 kg))

The MLW World Women's Featherweight Championship is a women's professional wrestling championship created and promoted by the American professional wrestling promotion Major League Wrestling (MLW). The current champion is Masha, who is in her first reign. She won the title by defeating Shotzi Blackheart at an MLW Fusion taping on September 12, 2026.

== History ==
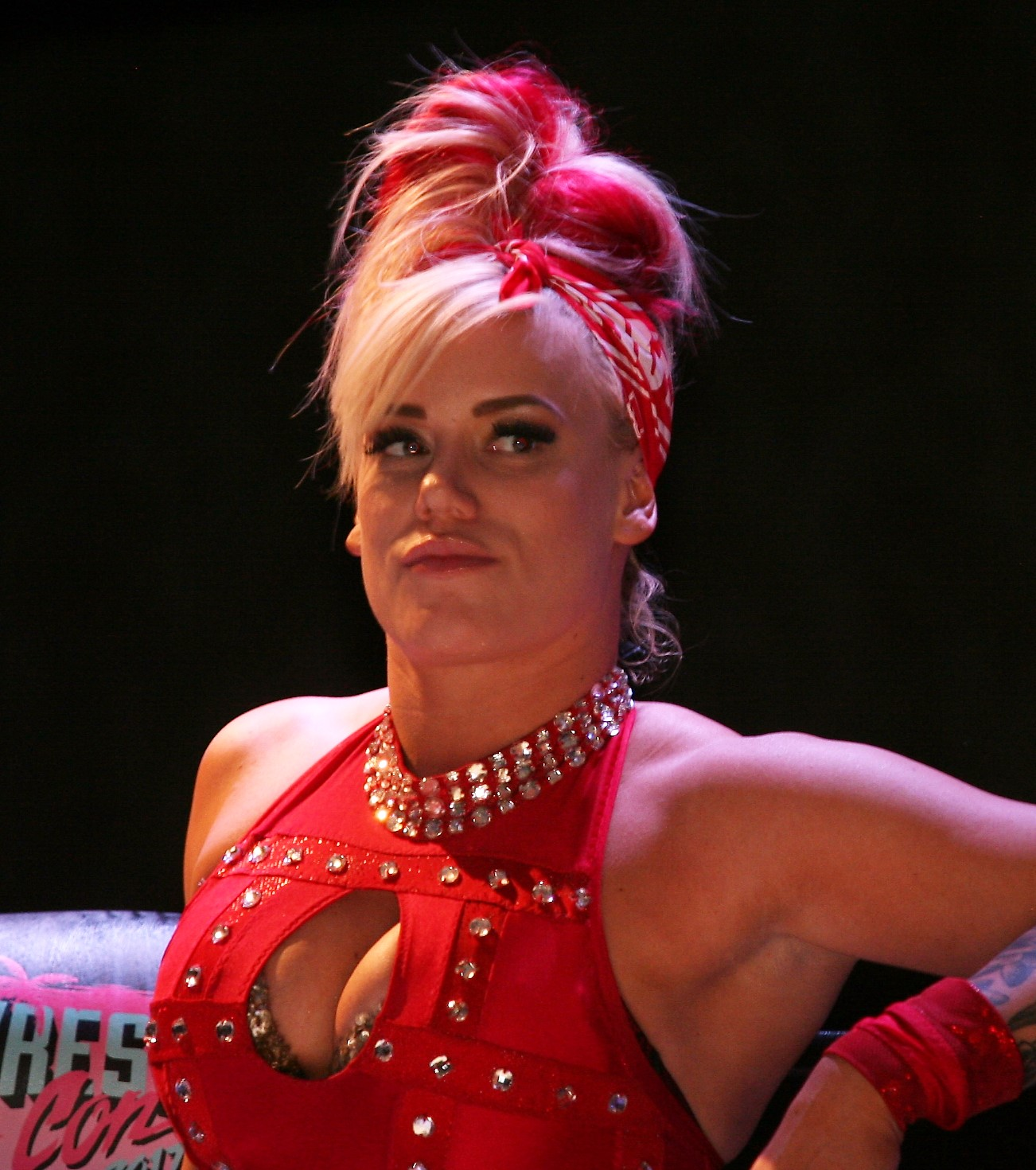
The inaugural champion Taya Valkyrie.

MLW previously teased the formation of a women's division on August 18, 2019, later announcing its official launch on October 18, 2019. The division's first official match was held at MLW Blood and Thunder of 2019 between Zeda Zhang and The Spider Lady which Zhang was successful at winning via disqualification.

Following MLW coming back from a lengthy hiatus due to the COVID-19 pandemic, on July 7, 2021, it was announced that Shimmer Women Athletes co-founder Dave Prazak had joined MLW to help relaunch its women's division. On the September 22, 2021, episode of Fusion: Alpha, MLW officially announced the launch of its MLW women's featherweight division and introduced the first wrestlers on the roster, including Brittany Blake, Holidead, Nicole Savoy, The Sea Stars (Ashley Vox and Delmi Exo), Willow Nightingale and Zoey Skye.

On April 21, 2022, it was announced that on May 13, 2022, at Kings of Colosseum that there will be a match between Taya Valkyrie and Holidead to determine who the first ever MLW Women's Featherweight Championship title holder is. During the match, Taya defeated Holidead via submission to become the inaugural championship holder.

Sometime during Taya Valkyrie's reign, the title's name was changed from the MLW Women's Featherweight Championship to the MLW World Women's Featherweight Championship according to MLW's official website.

On May 19, 2025 it was announced that the MLW Women's title will be defended in Japan for the first time ever in history at a Tokyo Joshi Pro-Wrestling event on June 7, 2025 as then-champion Shoko Nakajima faces Kaya Toribami. During the event Shoko was successful at retaining the title.

== Reigns ==
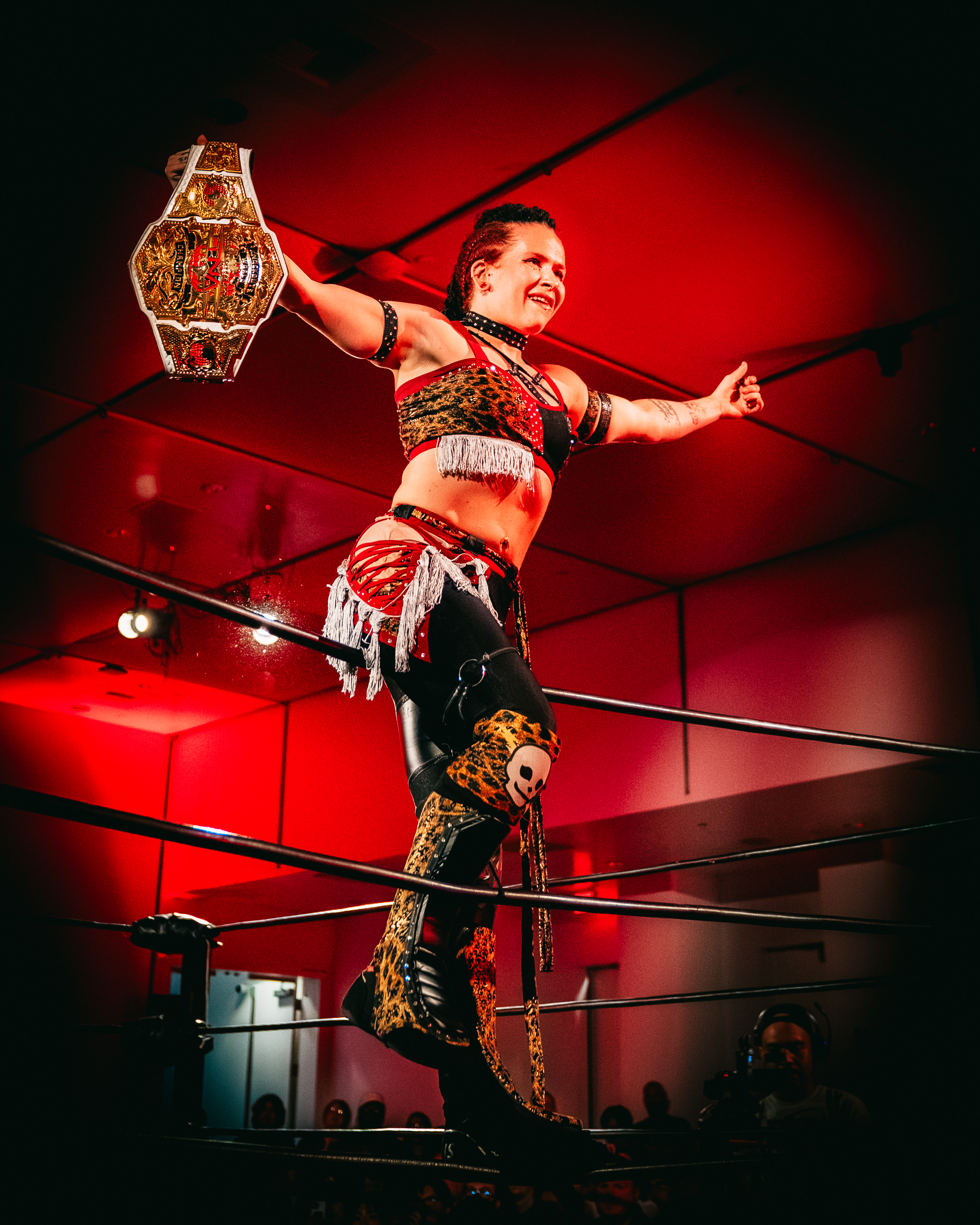
Current champion Masha (pictured here holding the TNA Knockouts World Championship).

As of November 10, 2026, there have been seven reigns between five champions Taya Valkyrie was the inaugural champion. She is also the oldest champion at 38 years old, while Masha Slamovich is the youngest at 28 years, 86 days old. Janai Kai's reign is the longest at 455 days, while Exo's second reign is the shortest at 84 days.

Masha is the current champion in her first reign. She won the title by defeating Shotzi Blackheart at an MLW Fusion taping in Charleston, South Carolina on September 12, 2026.

=== Names ===
Name	Year
MLW Women's Featherweight Championship	July 7, 2021 – July 31, 2022
MLW World Women's Featherweight Championship	July 31, 2022 – present

Key
No.	Overall reign number
Reign	Reign number for the specific champion
Days	Number of days held
+	Current reign is changing daily

No.	Champion	Championship change			Reign statistics		Notes	Ref.
No.	Champion	Date	Event	Location	Reign	Days	Notes	Ref.
Major League Wrestling (MLW)
1	Taya Valkyrie	May 13, 2022	Kings of Colosseum	Philadelphia, PA	1	328	Defeated Holidead to become the inaugural champion, which aired on tape delay on June 16. During this reign on July 31, 2022, the title name was changed to the MLW World Women's Featherweight Championship.	
2	Delmi Exo	April 6, 2023	War Chamber	Queens, NY	1	191	Aired on tape delay on June 15.	
3	Janai Kai	October 14, 2023	Slaughterhouse	Philadelphia, PA	1	455		
4	Delmi Exo	January 11, 2025	Kings of Colosseum	North Richland Hills, TX	2	84	This was a Title vs. Hair match.	
5	Shoko Nakajima	April 5, 2025	Battle Riot VII	Long Beach, CA	1	308		
6	Shotzi Blackheart	February 7, 2026	Fusion	Cicero, IL	1	217	Aired on tape delay on June 6.	
7	Masha	September 12, 2026	Fusion	Charleston, SC	1	59+	Will air on tape delay.	

== Combined reigns ==
As of November 10, 2026.

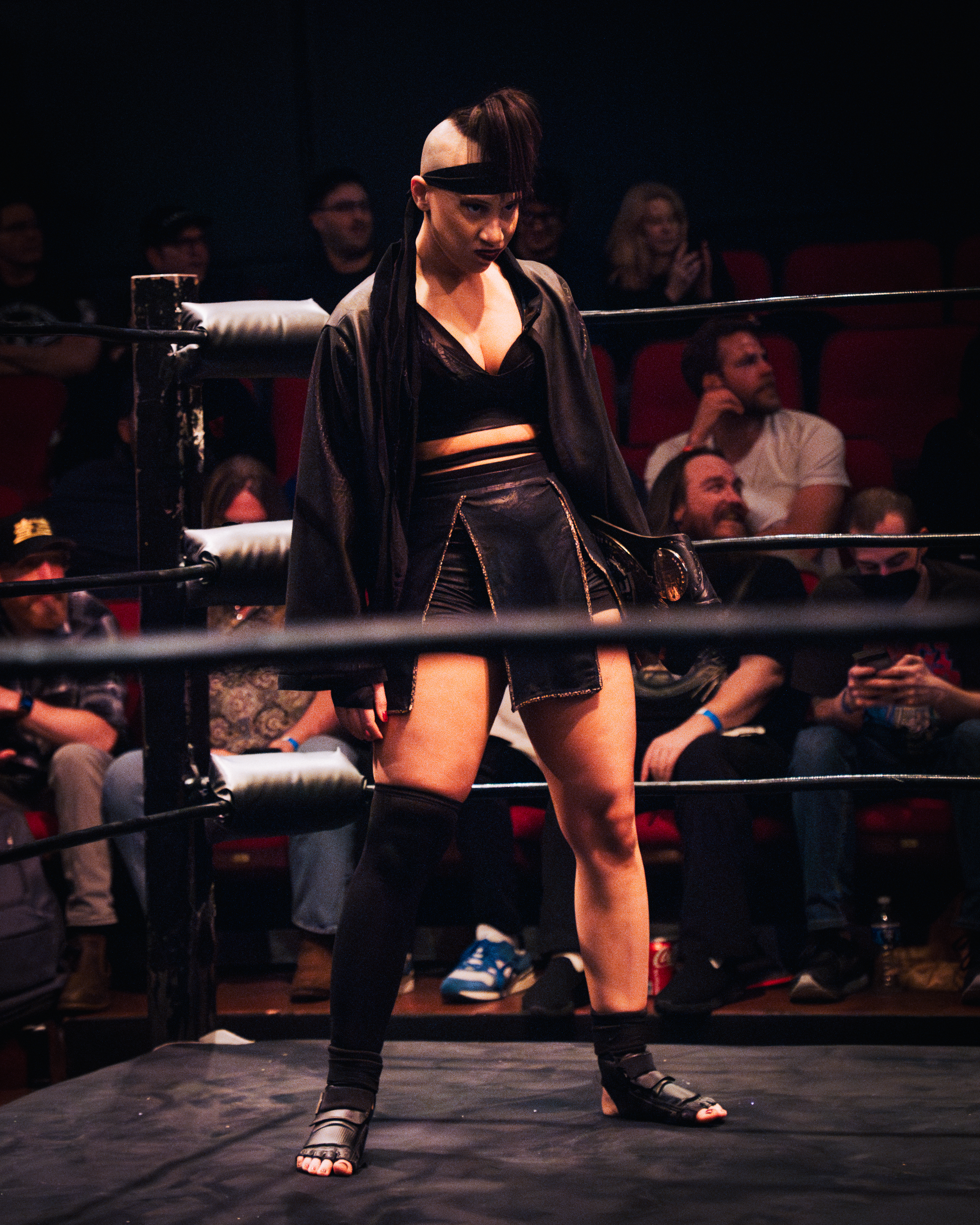
Longest reigning champion at a record-setting 455 days Janai Kai.

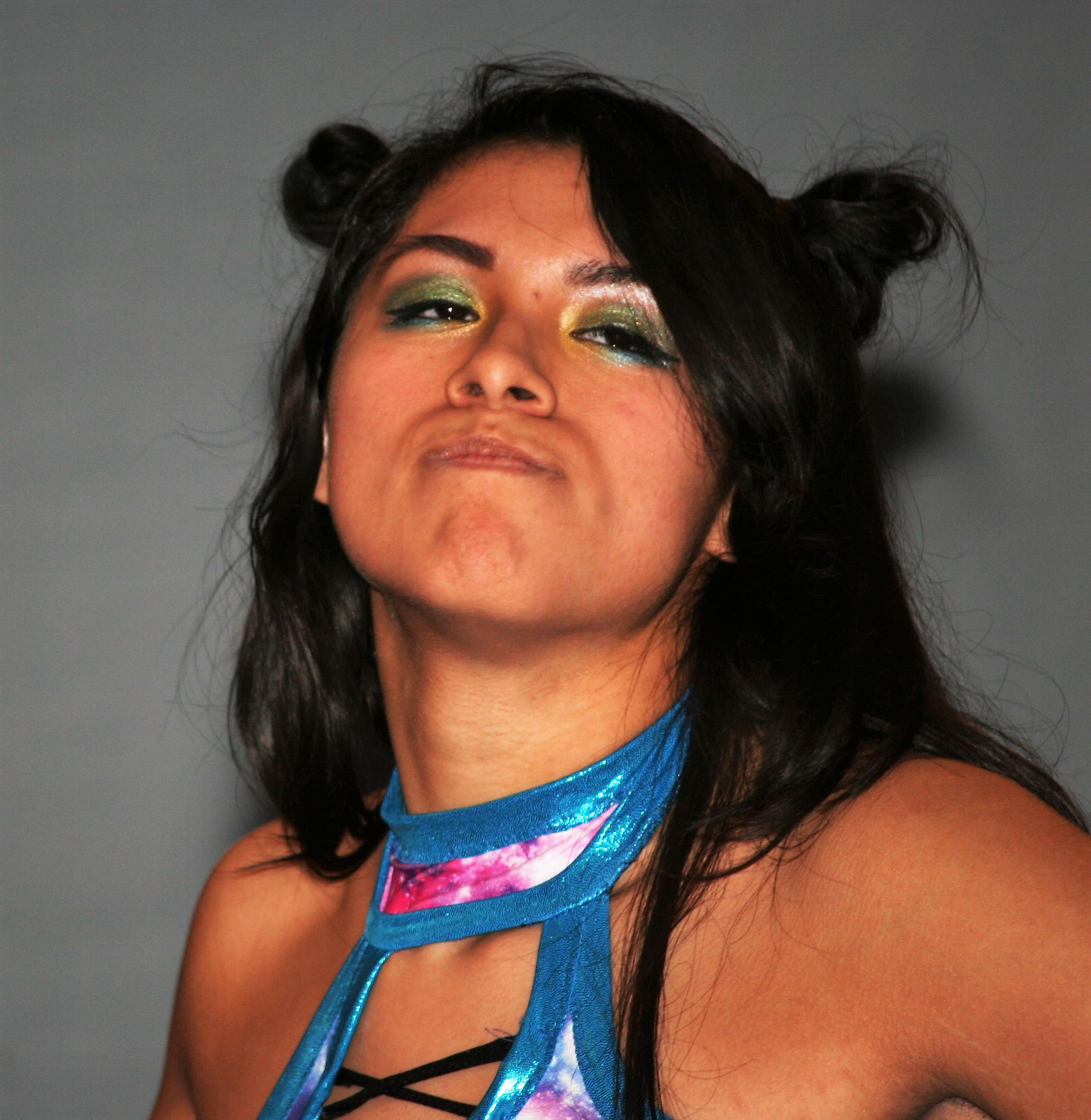
Record-setting 2-time champion Delmi Exo.

†	Indicates the current champion

Rank	Wrestler	No. of reigns	Combined days
1	Janai Kai	1	455
2	Taya Valkyrie	1	328
3	Shoko Nakajima	1	308
4	Delmi Exo	2	275
5	Shotzi Blackheart	1	217
6	Masha †	1	59+

== See also ==
- World Women's Championship (disambiguation)
