= Marshall and Ross Von Erich =

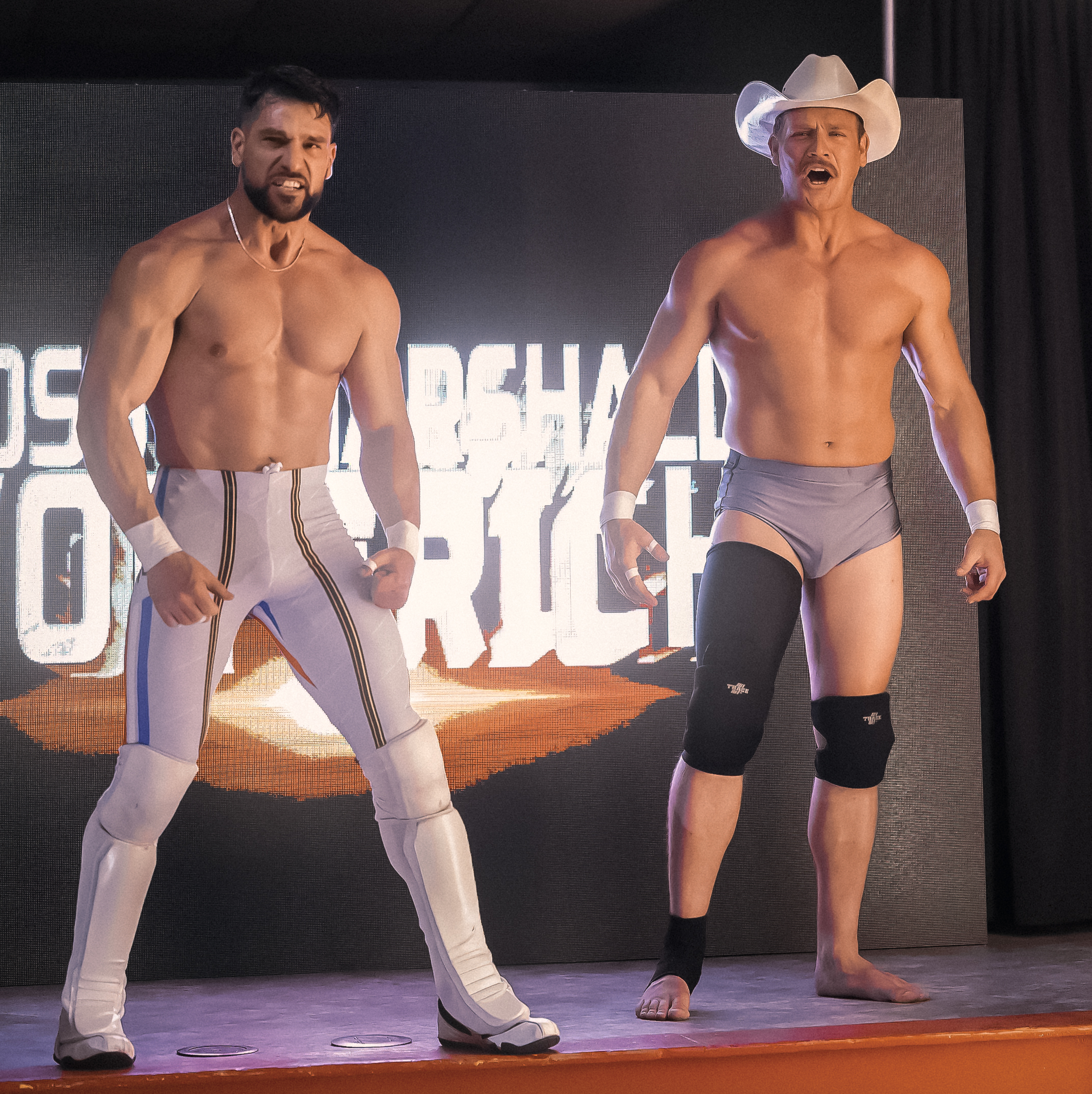
- Ross (left) and Marshall Von Erich in 2024

Tag team
- Members: Marshall Von Erich; Ross Von Erich
- Name(s): The Von Erichs; Marshall and Ross Von Erich; The VE Nation
- Billed heights: Marshall: 6 ft 4 in (1.93 m); Ross: 6 ft 1 in (1.85 m)
- Combined billed weight: 470 lb (210 kg)
- Debut: April 20, 2012
- Years active: 2012–present
- Trained by: Harley Race; Kevin Von Erich; Naomichi Marufuji; Pro Wrestling Noah

Marshall Von Erich and Ross Von Erich, also known together as The Von Erichs, are an American professional wrestling tag team. It consists of brothers Marshall and Ross, the sons of Kevin Von Erich and part of the Von Erich wrestling family. They are signed to All Elite Wrestling (AEW) and its sister promotion Ring of Honor (ROH), where they are members of The Sons of Texas stable. In ROH, they were two-thirds of the ROH World Six-Man Tag Team Champions with Dustin Rhodes. They are also known for their time in Total Nonstop Action Wrestling (TNA) and Major League Wrestling (MLW), where they are former MLW World Tag Team Champions.

== Professional wrestling career ==
=== Early career and independent circuit (2012–present) ===
They would make their professional wrestling debut on April 20, 2012, losing to Jason Jones and Brian Breaker at World League Wrestling in Sedalia, Missouri. The next night the brothers defeated Jones and Breaker in Richmond, Missouri. The brothers debuted for Pro Wrestling Noah on July 22, 2012.

Living in Hawaii, Ross and Marshall appeared and competed in Action Zone Wrestling out of Oahu, Hawaii and won the tag team championships. In July 2017, Marshall and Ross along with their father Kevin, wrestled at the Rage Megashow in Israel. On July 31, 2022, the Von Erich brothers lost to Mark and Jay Briscoe via pinfall, at the Ric Flair's Last Match pay-per-view event in Nashville, Tennessee.

=== Total Nonstop Action Wrestling (2014–2015) ===
The brothers later made their national television debut as part of the Total Nonstop Action Wrestling (TNA) Slammiversary XII PPV on June 15, 2014, in a tag match defeating The BroMans via disqualification. They also made various appearances on TNA Xplosion including the April 1, 2015 episode defeating the team of Sonjay Dutt and John Yurnet. and losing to The Revolution members James Storm and Manik on the July 1, 2015 episode. Marshall and Ross later rematched The Revolution at the TNA One Night Only Gut Check event on September 15, 2015, in a losing effort.

=== Major League Wrestling (2019–2022) ===
In May 2019, Ross and Marshall signed a multi-year contract with Major League Wrestling (MLW). On November 2, 2019, Marshall and Ross Von Erich defeated The Dynasty (Maxwell Jacob Friedman and Richard Holliday) to become the new MLW World Tag Team Champions at MLW Saturday Night SuperFight.

=== All Elite Wrestling / Ring of Honor (2023–present) ===
In December 2023 the brothers would make their debut appearances for All Elite Wrestling (AEW) and its sister promotion Ring of Honor (ROH), first at the taping of Rampage during the second part of AEW's 2023 Winter Is Coming (teaming with Orange Cassidy in a successful six-man tag match), and then at Zero Hour during ROH's 2023 Final Battle in a winning tag match. Both the AEW and ROH matches were held in the Dallas-Fort Worth Metroplex, where their grandfather, father, and uncles were local legends. At ROH's Death Before Dishonor, the brothers teamed with Dustin Rhodes to defeat The Dark Order to earn a shot at the vacant ROH World Six-Man Tag Team Championship. At Battle of the Belts XI, the brothers and Rhodes defeated The Undisputed Kingdom to win the championships. The Von Erichs then formed a stable with Rhodes known as "The Sons of Texas" with Sammy Guevara, who held the ROH World Tag Team Championship with Rhodes.

== Personal lives ==
They are the sons of former professional wrestler Kevin Von Erich making them members of the Von Erich Family. Their grandfather was wrestler and promoter of World Class Championship Wrestling Fritz Von Erich, and their uncles David, Kerry, Mike, and Chris were all wrestlers as well. Their cousin, Lacey, is also a former wrestler for Total Nonstop Action Wrestling.

== In popular culture ==
Both brothers contributed stunts to the 2023 drama film The Iron Claw based on the Von Erich family tragedies that befell their uncles. Ross and Marshall are portrayed as children by brothers Leo and Sam Franich in the film respectively. Marshall would later praise the stunt work led by fellow wrestler Chavo Guerrero Jr., as well as Zac Efron's portrayal of his father.

== Championships and accomplishments ==
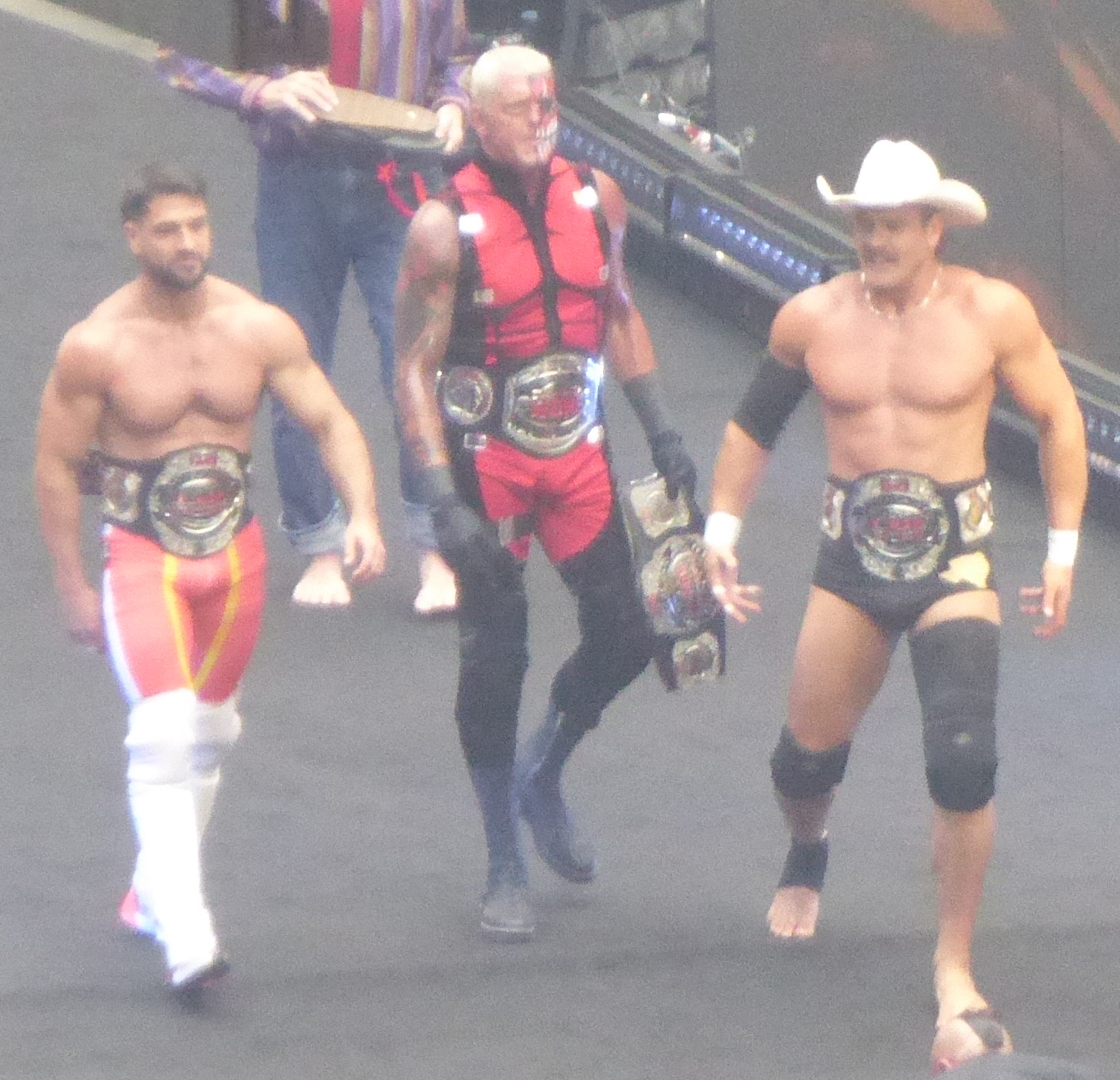
Ross (left) and Marshall (right) with Dustin Rhodes as the ROH World Six-Man Tag Team Champions

- Action Zone Wrestling
  - AZW Tag Team Championship (1 time)
- Imperial Wrestling Revolution
  - IWR Tag Team Championship (1 time)
- Major League Wrestling
  - MLW World Tag Team Championship (1 time)
- Ring of Honor
  - ROH World Six-Man Tag Team Championship (1 time) – with Dustin Rhodes
