= MLW World Tag Team Championship =

Professional wrestling championship

- The MLW World Tag Team Championship belt (May 2018 — present)

Details
- Promotion: Major League Wrestling (MLW)
- Date established: July 8, 2003
- Current champions: The Good Brothers (Doc Gallows and Karl Anderson)
- Date won: May 9, 2026 (aired August 15, 2026)

Other names
- MLW Global Tag Team Crown Championship (2003–2004); MLW World Tag Team Championship (2018–present)
Statistics
- First champions: The Extreme Horsemen (C.W. Anderson and Simon Diamond)
- Most reigns: As a team: CozyMax (Satoshi Kojima and Shigeo Okumura) (2 reigns); As individual: Davey Boy Smith Jr., Satoshi Kojima and Shigeo Okumura (2 reigns)
- Longest reign: The Von Erichs (Marshall and Ross Von Erich) (438 days)
- Shortest reign: World Titan Federation (Tom Lawlor and Davey Boy Smith Jr.) (53 days)
- Oldest champion: Minoru Suzuki (56 years, 73 days)
- Youngest champion: Maxwell Jacob Friedman (23 years, 113 days)
- Heaviest champion: Juicy Finau (449 lbs)
- Lightest champion: Rey Fénix (167 lbs)

The MLW World Tag Team Championship is a professional wrestling world tag team championship which is owned by the Major League Wrestling (MLW) promotion. The championship is generally contested in professional wrestling matches, in which participants usually execute scripted finishes rather than contend in direct competition.

The titles were unveiled on April 21, 2003, during the Underground TV tapings, under the MLW Global Tag Team Crown Championship name. The titles were vacated on February 10, 2004, after the promotion closed. After the relaunch of the promotion in 2017, The Lucha Brothers (Penta el 0M and Rey Fénix) would win the vacant titles under the MLW World Tag Team Championship name on June 7, 2018.

== History ==
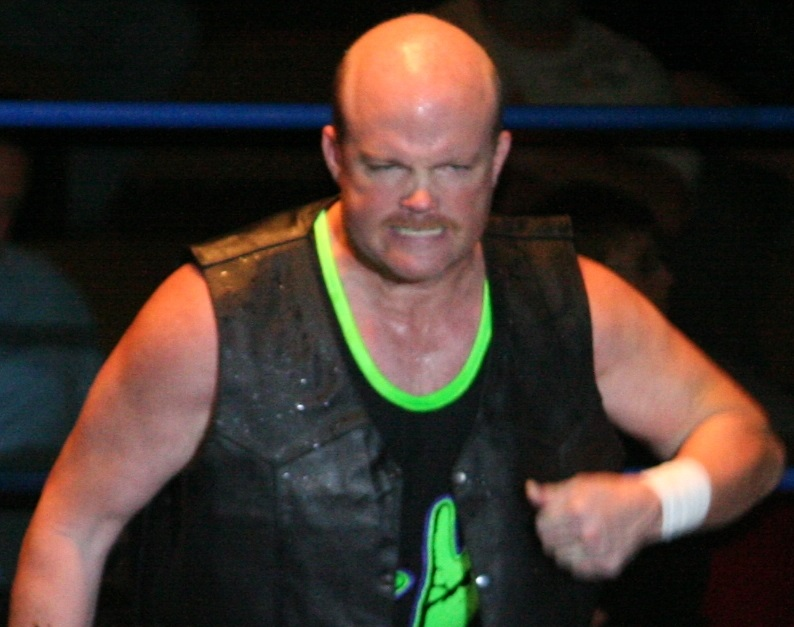
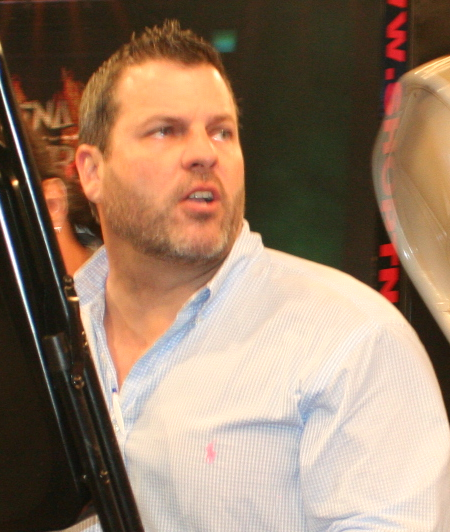
Inaugural champions C.W. Anderson and Simon Diamond of The Extreme Horsemen.

=== Establishment and inactivity (2003–2004) ===
The titles were unveiled on April 21, 2003, during the Underground TV tapings, under the MLW Global Tag Team Crown Championship name. MLW would start a four-team single-elimination tournament to crown the first champions. The teams for the tournament were PJ Friedman and Steve Williams, Jimmy Yang and Mike Sanders, The Extreme Horsemen (C.W. Anderson and Simon Diamond) and Los Maximos (José Maximo and Joel Maximo). Friedman and Williams and The Extreme Hoursemen would both advance to the finals of the tournament. On May 9 at MLW Revolutions, The Extreme Hoursemen would defeat Friedman and Williams to become the first champions. However their reign would end on February 10, 2004, after the promotion stopped running events.

==== Inaugural Championship tournament (2004) ====
Semifinals
PJ Friedman and Steve Williams
Jimmy Yang and Mike Sanders
The Extreme Horsemen (C.W. Anderson and Simon Diamond)
Los Maximos (José Maximo and Joel Maximo)

Final
PJ Friedman and Steve Williams
The Extreme Horsemen (C.W. Anderson and Simon Diamond)

=== Revival (since 2018) ===
After the promotion was revived the July 2017, MLW announced on May 10, 2018, the revival of the titles under the MLW World Tag Team Championship name, with Lucha Brothers (Penta el 0M and Rey Fénix), Team TBD (Jason Cade and Jimmy Yuta) and The Dirty Blondes (Leo Brien and Michael Patrick) facing each other in a three-way elimination match on June 7 to crown the new champions. On June 7, Lucha Brothers would defeat Team TBD and The Dirty Blondes in a three-way elimination match to win the vacant championships.

==== Three-way elimination championship match ====
| Eliminated | Wrestler | Team | Eliminated by | Method of elimination |
|---|---|---|---|---|
| 1 | Michael Patrick | The Dirty Blondes | Jason Cade | Pinned after a Diving splash |
| 2 | Jimmy Yuta | Team TBD | Penta el 0M | Pinned after The Land Zone |
| Winner | Lucha Brothers (Penta el 0M and Rey Fénix) | | | |

== Reigns ==
As of August 16, 2026, there have been seventeen reigns between sixteen teams composed of 32 individual champions and two vacancies. The inaugural champions were The Extreme Horsemen (C.W. Anderson and Simon Diamond). The Von Erichs (Marshall and Ross Von Erich) reign is the longest at 438 days, while World Titan Federation (Tom Lawlor and Davey Boy Smith Jr.) have the shortest reign at 53 days. L.A. Park is the oldest champion at 55 while MJF is the youngest at 23.

The current champions are The Good Brothers (Doc Gallows and Karl Anderson), who are in their first reign as a team and individually. They won the titles by defeating The Skyscrapers (Donovan Dijak and Bishop Dyer) in a Tennessee Tornado match on the May 9, 2026 episode of Fusion in Chattanooga, Tennessee.
