= MLW World Heavyweight Championship =

Professional wrestling championship

- The second design of the MLW World Heavyweight Championship belt (2018-present)

Details
- Promotion: Major League Wrestling (MLW)
- Date established: April 7, 2002
- Current champion: Josh Bishop
- Date won: November 7, 2026 (aired November 7, 2026)

Other names
- MLW Championship; MLW World Heavyweight Championship (2002–present)
Statistics
- First champion: Shane Douglas
- Most reigns: Satoshi Kojima (2)
- Longest reign: Jacob Fatu (819 days)
- Shortest reign: Mike Awesome (10 minutes)
- Oldest champion: Satoshi Kojima (53 years)
- Youngest champion: Shane Strickland (28 years)
- Heaviest champion: Mike Awesome (292 lbs)
- Lightest champion: Low Ki (174 lbs)

The MLW World Heavyweight Championship is a world heavyweight championship owned and promoted by Major League Wrestling (MLW). It is the promotion's principal championship. The championship was established on June 15, 2002 at the Genesis and was active until February 10, 2004 after the promotion stopped hosting events. The championship was reactivated in 2018. The current champion is Josh Bishop, who is in his first reign. He won the title by defeating Killer Kross in a Last Man Standing match at Saturday Night SuperFight on November 7, 2026.

== History ==
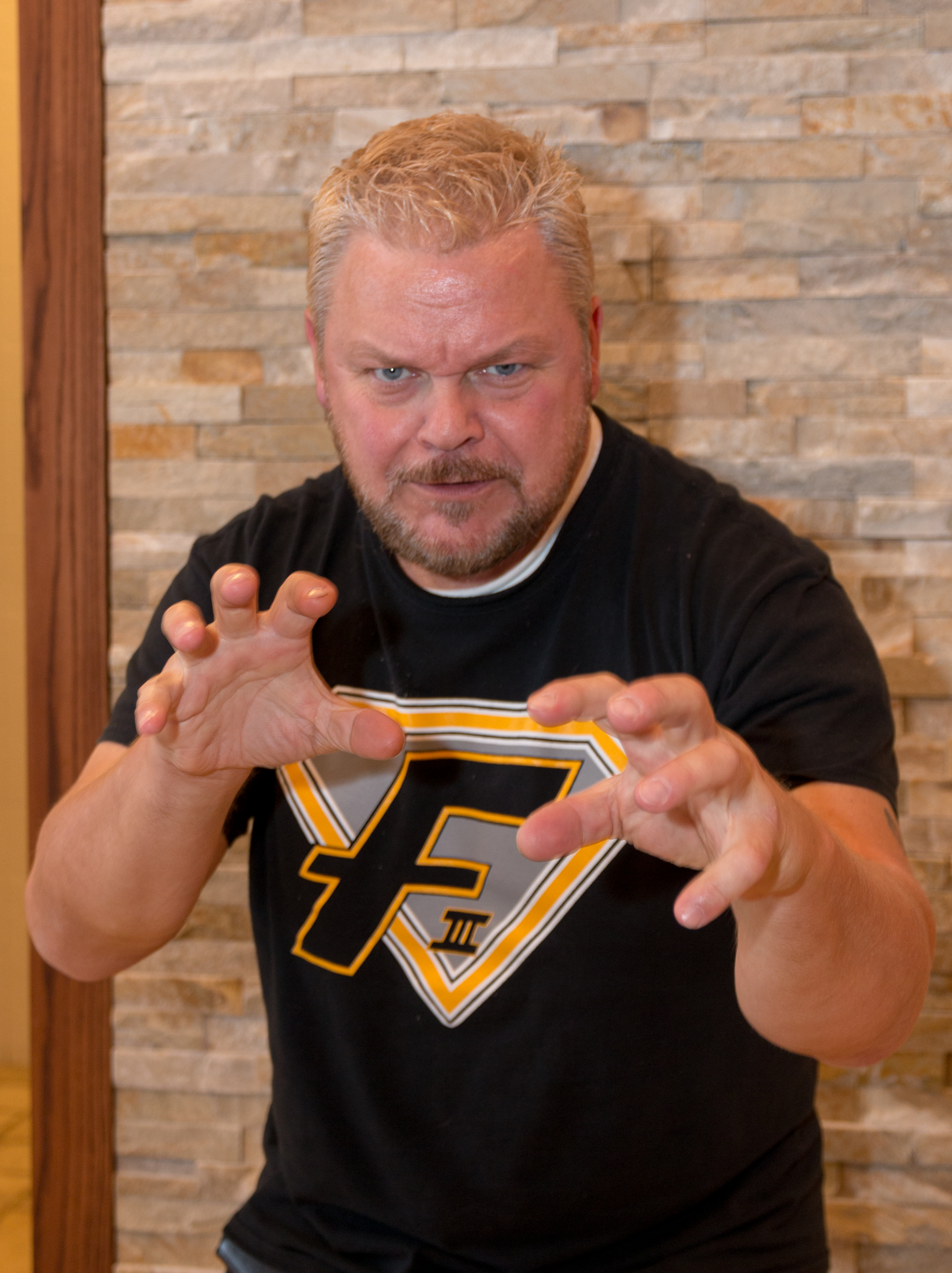
Shane Douglas became the first champion when he won the title in 2002

On June 15, 2002, Major League Wrestling held an eight-man single-elimination tournament to crown the first MLW Champion at its inaugural Genesis event. Jerry Lynn, Shane Douglas, Vampiro and Taiyo Kea advanced to the semifinals. Douglas defeated Lynn to advance to the finals, and caused the match between Vampiro and Kea to be declared a no contest. As a result, both wrestlers advanced to the finals for a three-way dance. Douglas defeated both Kea and Vampiro to become the first champion. Afterwards, Douglas threw the belt down, like he did with the NWA World Heavyweight Championship belt. Referee John Finnegan threatened that Douglas would be banned from wrestling in Philadelphia if he didn't defend the title. MLW went on hiatus for three months after the match.

Upon the company's return, Satoshi Kojima defeated Jerry Lynn in New York City, New York at MLW's Reload event on September 26 for the vacant MLW World Heavyweight Championship. MLW promoter Court Bauer would later confirm that this title lineage and belt design was a separate championship from the MLW Championship won by Shane Douglas in June 2002. As such, Kojima was recognized as the first MLW World Heavyweight Champion. Kojima defended the title in his home promotion All Japan Pro Wrestling (AJPW), with the defenses airing on both MLW Underground TV and AJPW broadcasts in Japan. Kojima lost the title at Hybrid Hell on June 20, 2003 to Mike Awesome. Afterwards, Awesome lost the title to Steve Corino, as Corino exercised Awesome's promise for a title shot. It was later reported that Kojima's employers, AJPW would not allow him to drop the title to an employee of a rival company Pro Wrestling Zero-One, which was Steve Corino. Corino remained champion until the promotion closed on February 10, 2004.

MLW resumed wrestling operations in July 2017. In January 2018, MLW announced its Road to the World Championship, an eight-man single-elimination tournament to crown a new champion. During the tournament, A. C. H. replaced Tom Lawlor in the semi-finals, after he suffered an injury. On April 12, Shane Strickland defeated Matt Riddle in The World Championship Finals. Low Ki made the first international title defense since 2003 in Claremont, Australia, as he defeated Jonah Rock on November 30 in a New Horizon Pro Wrestling event. Starting in July 2019, MLW would begin playing a Championship Lineage video (similar to New Japan Pro-Wrestling) highlighting all previous MLW World Heavyweight Champions before sanctioned championship matches. This lineage package would once again confirm Shane Douglas' reign as not recognized as part of the MLW World Heavyweight Championship history.

== Championship tournaments ==
=== Inaugural MLW World Championship Tournament (2002) ===
Quarterfinals
Jerry Lynn	Pin
La Parka	7:04
Shane Douglas	Pin
Steve Corino	9:40
Taiyo Kea	Pin
The Wall	6:43
Vampiro	Pin
Christopher Daniels	13:56

Semifinals
Jerry Lynn	Pin
Shane Douglas	7:32
Taiyo Kea	Bye
Vampiro	17:00

Final
Shane Douglas	Pin
Taiyo Kea Vampiro	1:15

=== Road to the Championship Tournament (2018) ===
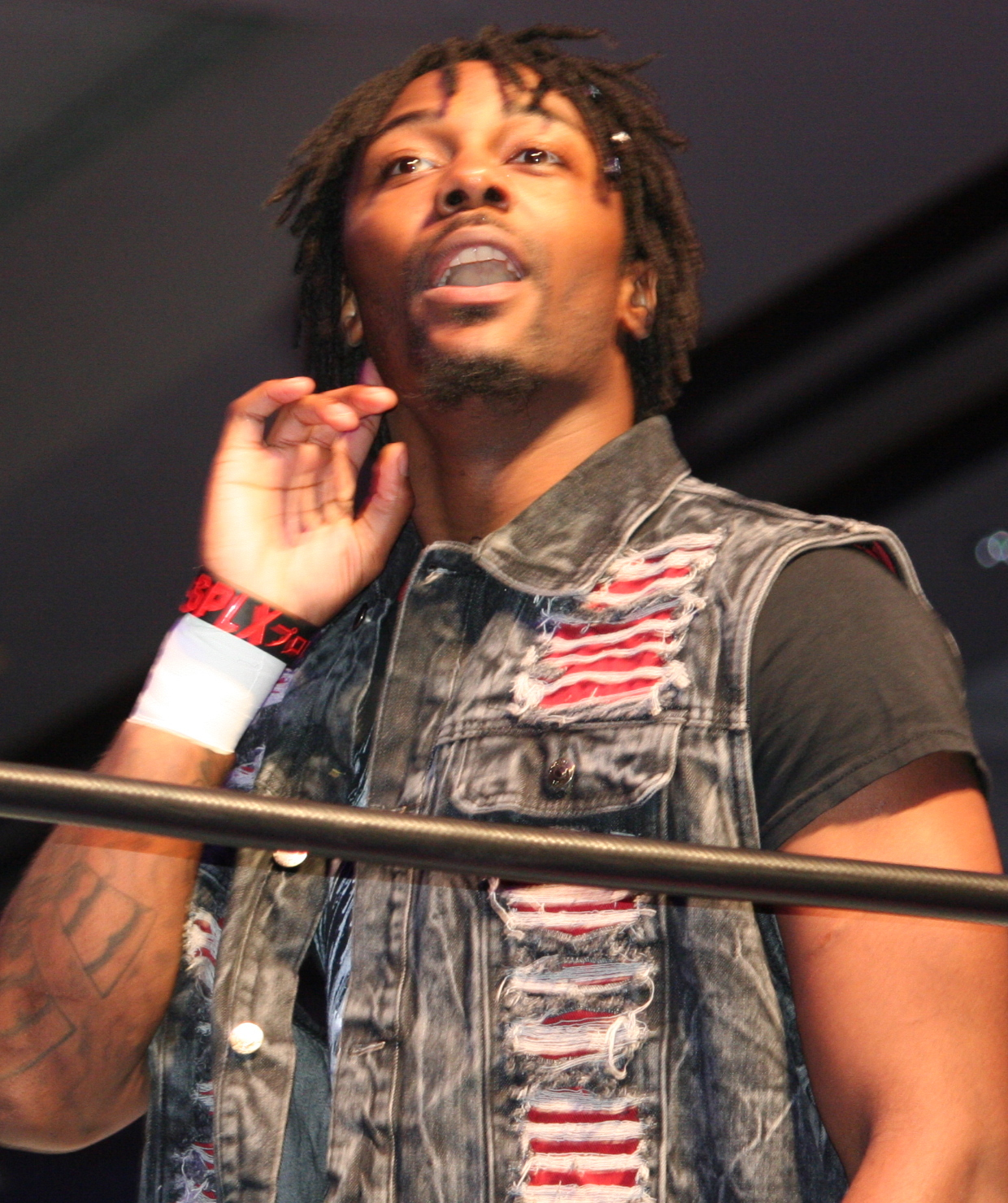
When the title was reactivated, Shane Strickland won a tournament to win the championship in 2018

First round Road To The World Championship (February 8)
MVP	10:44
Tom Lawlor	Pin
Matt Riddle	Pin
Jeff Cobb	13:40
Shane Strickland	Pin
Brody King	10:53
Jimmy Havoc	Pin
Maxwell Jacob Friedman	9:36

Semifinals; Spring Break (March 8)
A. C. H.
Matt Riddle	Pin
Shane Strickland	Pin
Jimmy Havoc

Final; The World Championship Finals (April 12)
Matt Riddle	21:45
Shane Strickland	Pin

== Reigns ==
As of February 5, 2024, there have been fifteen reigns and one vacancy shared between fourteen different champions. Shane Douglas was the inaugural champion, defeating Taiyo Kea and Vampiro at Genesis on June 15, 2002, to become the inaugural champion. Jacob Fatu's reign is the longest at 819 days, while Mike Awesome's reign is the shortest at 10 minutes. Satoshi Kojima is the oldest champion when he won it at 53 years old, while Shane Strickland is the youngest champion at 28 years old.

Josh Bishop is the current champion in his first reign. He won the title by defeating last champion Killer Kross in a Last Man Standing match at Saturday Night SuperFight on November 7, 2026 in Cicero, Illinois.

Key
No.	Overall reign number
Reign	Reign number for the specific champion
Days	Number of days held
<1	Reign lasted less than a day
+	Current reign is changing daily

No.	Champion	Championship change			Reign statistics		Notes	Ref.
No.	Champion	Date	Event	Location	Reign	Days	Notes	Ref.
Major League Wrestling (MLW)
1	Shane Douglas	June 15, 2002	Genesis	Philadelphia, PA	1	90	Defeated Taiyō Kea and Vampiro in a three way dance to become inaugural champion. Douglas immediately threw down the championship after the match. This reign has only received occasional recognition from MLW.	
—	Vacated	September 13, 2002	—	—	—	—	Shane Douglas was stripped of the championship due to his controversial actions at Genesis.	
2	Satoshi Kojima	September 26, 2002	Reload	New York City, NY	1	267	Defeated Jerry Lynn to win the vacant title.	
3	Mike Awesome	June 20, 2003	Hybrid Hell	Fort Lauderdale, FL	1	<1		
4	Steve Corino	June 20, 2003	Hybrid Hell	Fort Lauderdale, FL	1	235	Corino challenged Mike Awesome to a match following Awesome's victory over Satoshi Kojima.	
—	Vacated	February 10, 2004	—	—	—	—	Steve Corino was no longer listed as the MLW World Heavyweight Champion after the company stopped hosting events.	
—	Deactivated	2004	—	—	—	—	The title became deactivated when the company stopped hosting events.	
5	Shane Strickland	April 12, 2018	The World Championship Finals	Orlando, FL	1	91	Defeated Matt Riddle in the tournament finals to win the revived title.	
6	Low Ki	July 12, 2018	Fusion	Orlando, FL	1	205	MLW recognizes this reign as beginning on July 20, 2018, when the match aired on tape delay.	
7	Tom Lawlor	February 2, 2019	SuperFight	Philadelphia, PA	1	154		
8	Jacob Fatu	July 6, 2019	Kings of Colosseum	Cicero, IL	1	819		
9	Alexander Hammerstone	October 2, 2021	Fightland	Philadelphia, PA	1	644	This was a Winner takes all match where Hammerstone's MLW National Openweight Championship was also on the line.	
10	Alex Kane	July 8, 2023	Never Say Never	Philadelphia, PA	1	210		
11	Satoshi Kojima	February 3, 2024	SuperFight	Philadelphia, PA	2	343		
12	Matt Riddle	January 11, 2025	Kings of Colosseum	North Richland Hills, TX	1	245		
13	Mads Krule Krügger	September 13, 2025	Fightland	North Richland Hills, TX	1	138	This was a three-way match also involving Donovan Dijak in which Krügger cashed-in his Gravity Gramble contract.	
14	Killer Kross	January 29, 2026	Battle Riot VIII	Kissimmee, FL	1	282	This was a Battle Riot match which Kross won by last eliminating Matt Riddle. Aired on tape delay on February 5, 2026.	
15	Josh Bishop	November 7, 2026	Saturday Night SuperFight	Cicero, IL	1	2+	This was a Last Man Standing match.	

== Combined reigns ==
As of November 9, 2026.

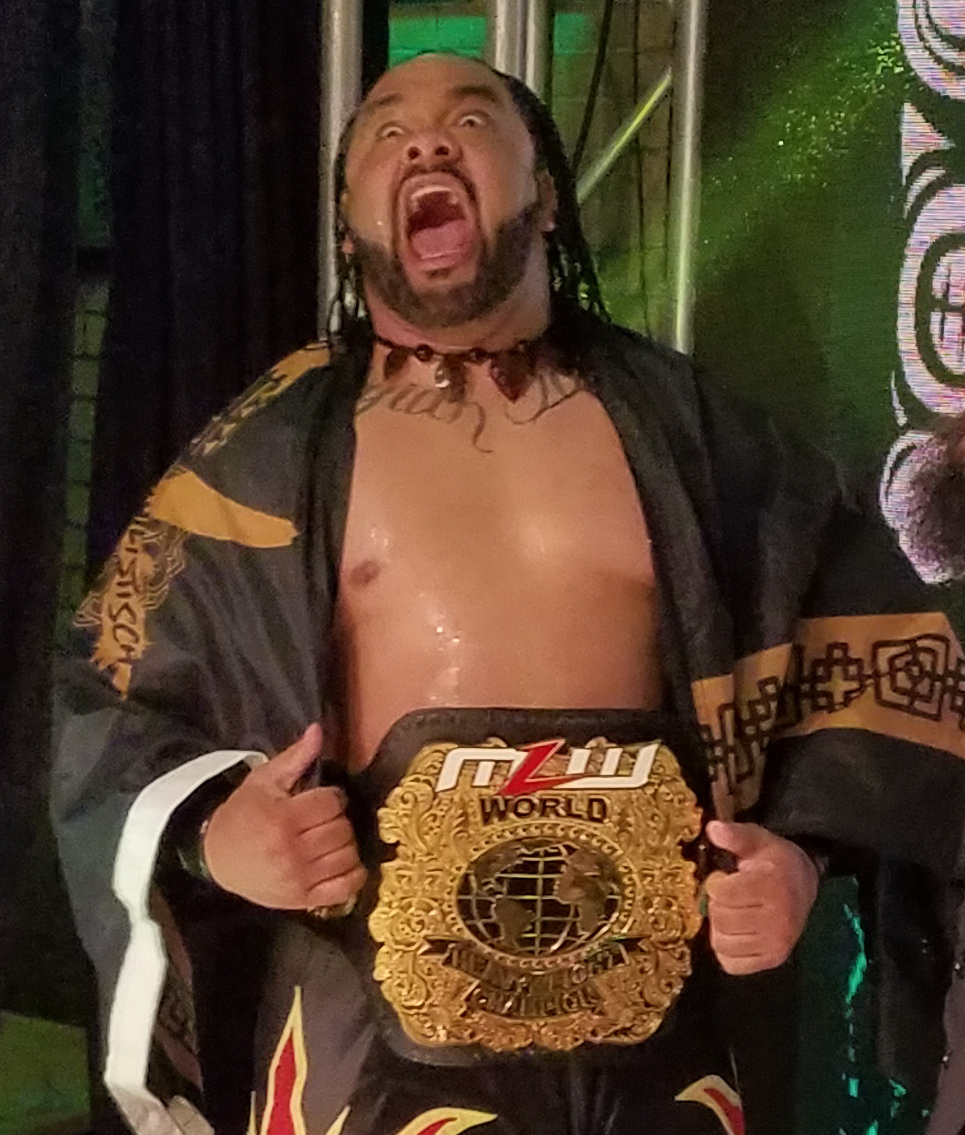
Longest reigning champion at 819 days, Jacob Fatu

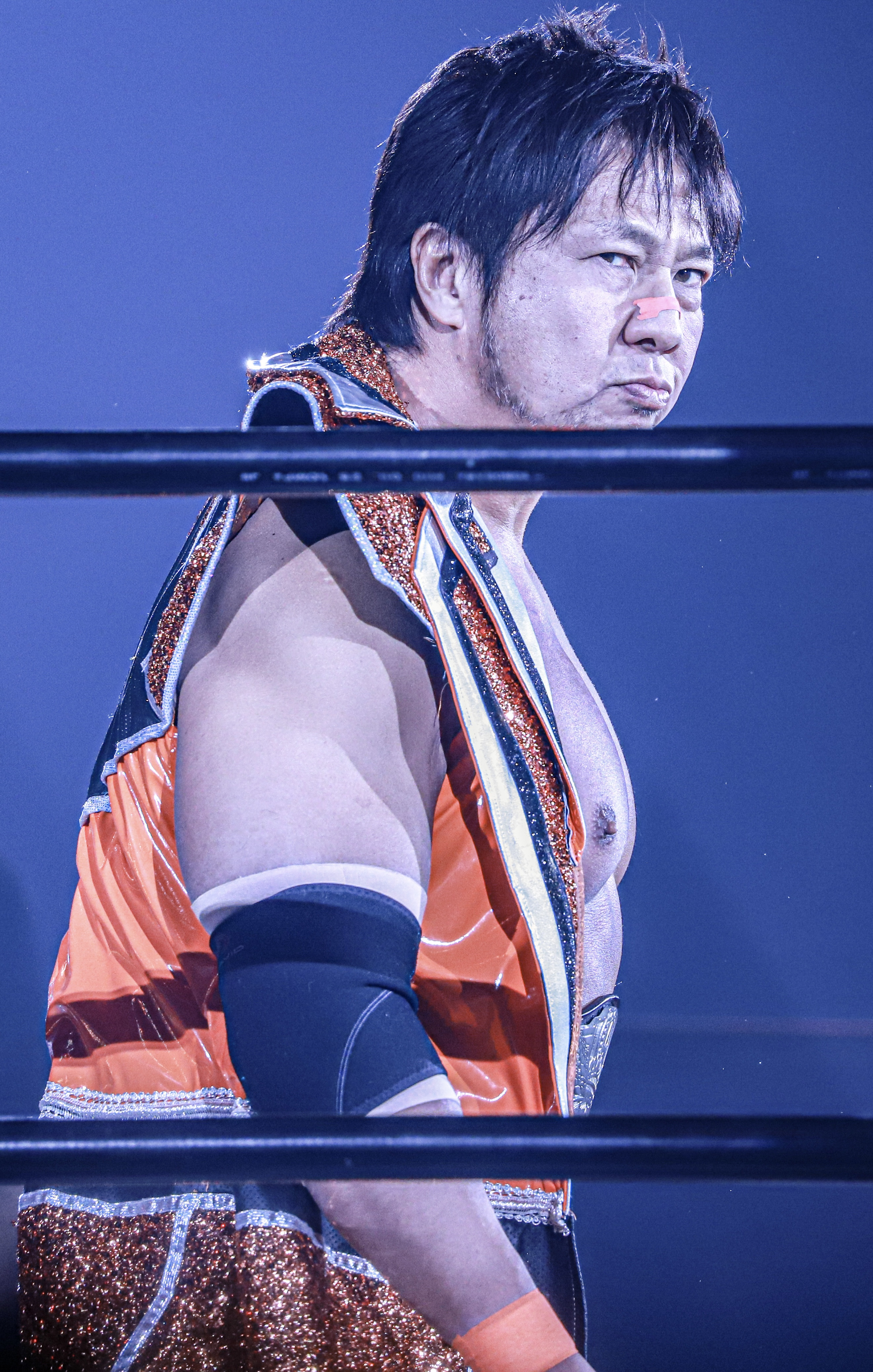
Satoshi Kojima is the only two-time champion. At 53 years old, he is the oldest wrestler to held the title and the only one to win in the first and second run of MLW.

†	Indicates the current champions

Rank	Wrestler	No. of reigns	Combined days
1	Jacob Fatu	1	819
2	Alexander Hammerstone	1	644
3	Satoshi Kojima	2	610
4	Killer Kross	1	282
5	Matt Riddle	1	245
6	Steve Corino	1	235
7	Alex Kane	1	210
8	Low Ki	1	205
9	Tom Lawlor	1	154
10	Mads Krule Krügger	1	138
11	Shane Strickland	1	91
12	Shane Douglas	1	90
13	Josh Bishop †	1	2+
14	Mike Awesome	1	<1
