= MLW National Openweight Championship =

Men's professional wrestling championship

- Official belt design (2019–present)

Details
- Promotion: Major League Wrestling (MLW)
- Date established: April 18, 2019
- Current champion: Matt Riddle
- Date won: November 8, 2026
Statistics
- First champion: Alexander Hammerstone
- Most reigns: All titleholders (1)
- Longest reign: Alexander Hammerstone (865 days)
- Shortest reign: John Hennigan (89 days)
- Oldest champion: Blue Panther (65 years, 4 days)
- Youngest champion: Alex Kane (28 years, 16 days)
- Heaviest champion: Rickey Shane Page (282 lb (128 kg))
- Lightest champion: Davey Richards (202 lb (92 kg))

The MLW National Openweight Championship is an openweight professional wrestling championship created and promoted by the American professional wrestling promotion Major League Wrestling (MLW). The title was unveiled on April 18, 2019. The title's openweight nature means that wrestlers from both MLW's heavyweight and middleweight divisions are eligible to challenge for it. The inaugural champion was Alexander Hammerstone. The current champion is Matt Riddle, who is in his first reign. He won the title by defeating Austin Aries at Lucha de los Muertos on November 8, 2026.

== History ==
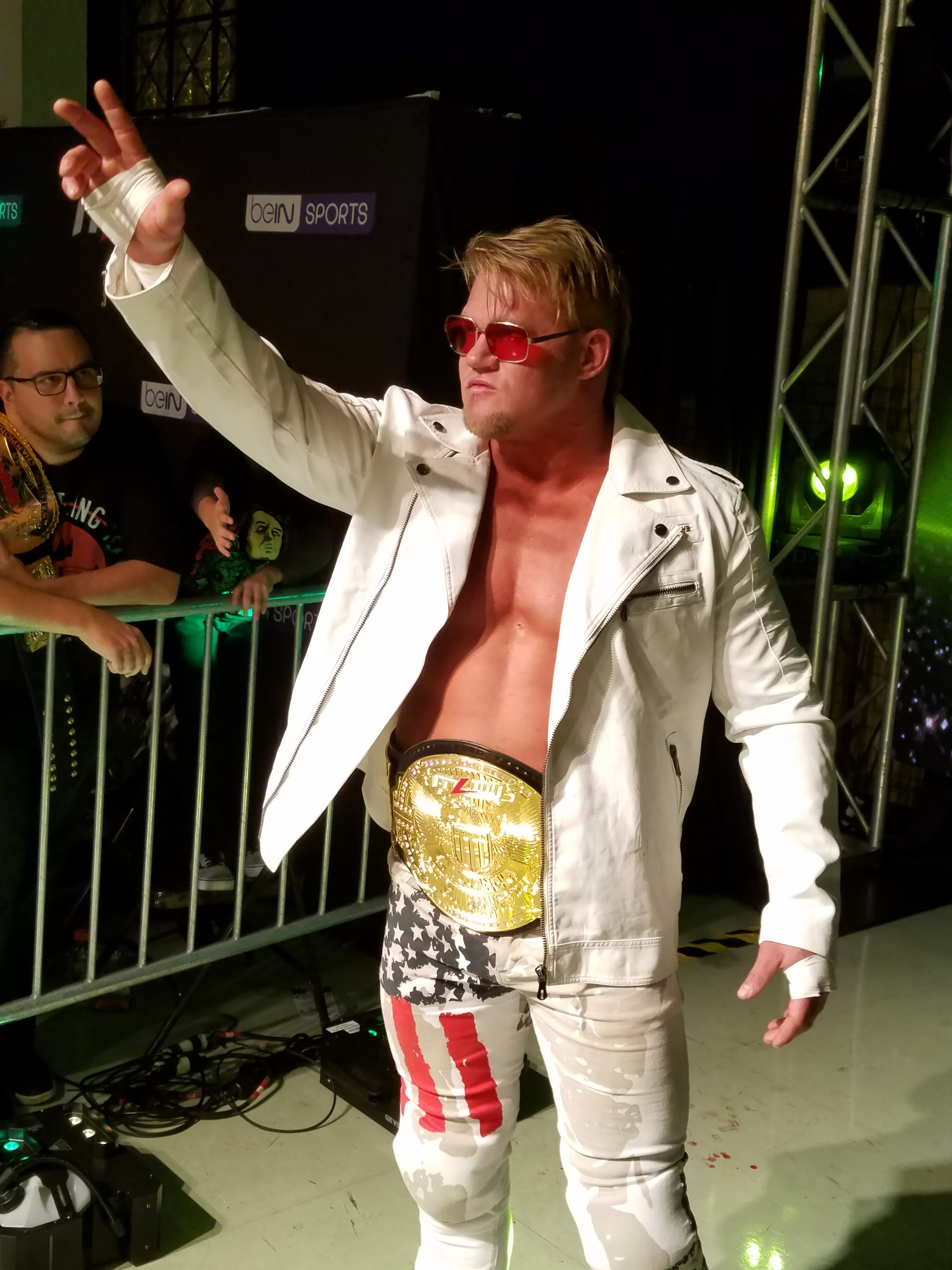
The inaugural champion Alexander Hammerstone

On April 18, 2019, Major League Wrestling (MLW) announced the creation of the MLW National Openweight Championship, a secondary championship for the company to be defended in their newly created openweight division, a division more common in Japanese professional wrestling. Also announced was a four-man single-elimination tournament that would culminate on June 1 with the crowning of the first champion. The tournament to crown the inaugural champion was later advertised on MLW Fusion, while being announced four wrestler to participate in the tournament, which was announced on May 4 by MLW Fusion's Executive Producer Salina de la Renta. The title was unveiled on May 17. On June 1 at Fury Road, Alexander Hammerstone defeated Brian Pillman Jr. in the finals of the tournament to become the inaugural MLW National Openweight Champion.

=== Inaugural championship tournament ===
Fusion (May 4, 2019)
Alexander Hammerstone	Pin
Gringo Loco	4:55
Rich Swann	Pin
Brian Pillman Jr.	6:44

Fury Road (June 1, 2019)
Alexander Hammerstone	Pin
Brian Pillman Jr.

== Reigns ==
As of November 12, 2026, there have been twelve reigns between twelve different champions and one vacancy. Alexander Hammerstone was the inaugural champion. Hammerstone's reign is the longest at 865 days, while John Hennigan's reign is the shortest at 89 days. Hennigan was also the oldest champion when he won it at 43 years old, while Alex Kane was the youngest champion at 28 years old.

Matt Riddle is the current champion in his first reign. He won the title by defeating Austin Aries at Lucha de los Muertos in Cicero, Illinois, on November 8, 2026.

Key
No.	Overall reign number
Reign	Reign number for the specific champion
Days	Number of days held
+	Current reign is changing daily

No.	Champion	Championship change			Reign statistics		Notes	Ref.
No.	Champion	Date	Event	Location	Reign	Days	Notes	Ref.
Major League Wrestling (MLW)
1	Alexander Hammerstone	June 1, 2019	Fury Road	Waukesha, WI	1	865	Hammerstone defeated Brian Pillman Jr. in the finals of a four-man tournament to become the inaugural champion.	
—	Vacated	October 13, 2021	—	—	—	—	Hammerstone relinquished the title after winning the MLW World Heavyweight Championship.	
2	Alex Kane	November 6, 2021	War Chamber	Philadelphia, PA	1	229	Kane defeated Myron Reed, Alex Shelley, A. C. H. and Zenshi in a five-way ladder match to win the vacant title.	
3	Davey Richards	June 23, 2022	Battle Riot IV	New York City, NY	1	198		
4	John Hennigan	January 7, 2023	Blood and Thunder	Philadelphia, PA	1	89	Hennigan won the title as Johnny Fusion, but began using his real name thereafter.	
5	Jacob Fatu	April 6, 2023	War Chamber	Queens, NY	1	150		
6	Rickey Shane Page	September 3, 2023	Fury Road	Philadelphia, PA	1	251		
7	Bad Dude Tito	May 11, 2024	Azteca Lucha	Cicero, IL	1	182		
8	Matthew Justice	November 9, 2024	Lucha Apocalypto	Cicero, IL	1	174	This match aired November 10, 2024.	
9	Último Guerrero	May 2, 2025	CMLL vs. MLW	Mexico City, Mexico	1	142		
10	Blue Panther	September 21, 2025	Día Nacional de la Lucha Libre	Mexico City, Mexico	1	139	This was a Consejo Mundial de Lucha Libre event.	
11	Austin Aries	February 7, 2026	Fusion	Chicago, Illinois	1	274	Aired on tape delay as a special episode on June 20.	
12	Matt Riddle	November 8, 2026	Lucha de los Muertos	Cicero, Illinois	1	4+	Airing on Fusion at a later date.	
