= Intimidation Games (2024) =

2024 Major League Wrestling event

- Promotional poster featuring various wrestlers
- Promotion: Major League Wrestling
- Date: February 29, 2024
- City: Queens, New York
- Venue: Melrose Ballroom
- Attendance: 1,000

Event chronology
← Previous; SuperFight	Next → War Chamber

Intimidation Games chronology
← Previous; 2022	Next → 2025

Intimidation Games (2024) was a professional wrestling pay-per-view event produced by Major League Wrestling (MLW). It took place on February 29, 2024, at the Melrose Ballroom in Queens, New York, and streamed live on Triller TV. It was the fourth event under the Intimidation Games chronology.

Additional matches were taped for MLW's "Once Upon A Time In New York" special, which aired on BeIN Sports USA and MLW's YouTube channel on March 16.

== Production ==
=== Background ===
Other on-screen personnel
Role:	Name:
Commentators	Joe Dombrowski
Commentators	Matt Striker

Intimidation Games is a reoccurring event produced by Major League Wrestling (MLW) that was first held on May 3, 2018, as a television taping for MLW Fusion. The second event was broadcast live on March 2, 2019, as a special episode of Fusion.

On December 18, 2023, MLW announced that the fourth edition of Intimidation Games would take place on February 29, 2024, at the Melrose Ballroom in Queens, New York. As part of MLW's partnership with Triller TV to produce live specials for TrillerTV+ subscribers, the 2024 edition will also be the second to air live.

=== Storylines ===
The card consisted of matches that result from scripted storylines, where wrestlers portrayed villains, heroes, or less distinguishable characters in scripted events that built tension and culminate in a wrestling match or series of matches, with results predetermined by MLW's writers. Storylines were played out across MLW's social media platforms.

Per MLW's "Open Door Policy," several free agents would be announced for the event, including the MLW return of Bobby Fish. and the debut of former WWE wrestler A. J. Franci$.

On December 27, 2023, MLW announced on their website that Matt Riddle will be in action at Intimidation Games. During The Burning Crush, which aired on February 17, 2024, Riddle in vignette challenged anyone from New Japan Pro-Wrestling to meet him at the event. Later, it was announced that Bad Dude Tito of TMDK would be Riddle's opponent. Several days later on Night 1 of NJPW The New Beginning in Sapporo, Riddle defeated Hiroshi Tanahashi to capture the NJPW World Television Championship, with MLW announcing that his match with Tito at Intimidation Games will be for the title.

During the Reload special on January 20, 2024, Minoru Suzuki was announced to be returning to MLW at Intimidation Games. His opponent would be revealed as Satoshi Kojima at SuperFight. Later in the night, Kojima would defeat Alex Kane to win the MLW World Heavyweight Championship, thus making his match with Suzuki at Intimidation Games a world title match.

When Místico was announced to debut in MLW at SuperFight, Promociones Dorado promoter Salina de la Renta was confused as she had not authorized the deal. As her stable was the main pipeline for Latin American wrestlers to MLW, she was suspicious. As such, de la Renta would accompany Místico's rival Averno for their match at SuperFight. Over the next several weeks, several signs began pointing to Cesar Duran, former MLW matchmaker and owner of Azteca Underground – which had previously purchased Promociones Dorado in 2020 – returning to the company. Duran had been kidnapped and reported missing since the summer of 2023, though his masked Azteca henchmen would still maintain a presence. It was eventually revealed that de la Renta orchestrated Duran's disappearance after he held her captive back in 2021. At SuperFight, Duran fully returned to announce Místico for his match, where he beat Averno. After the match, MLW announced that Místico would challenge Promociones Dorado's Rocky Romero for the MLW World Middleweight Championship at Intimidation Games.

== Results ==
Intimidation Games
No.	Results	Stipulations	Times
1	Místico (with Cesar Duran) defeated Rocky Romero (c) (with Salina de la Renta) by submission	Singles match for the MLW World Middleweight Championship	17:58
2	The Calling (Rickey Shane Page and Sami Callihan) defeated Akira and Jake Crist by pinfall	New York City Street Fight	11:08
3	Alex Kane (with The Bomaye Fight Club (Mr. Thomas and Faye Jackson)) defeated Bobby Fish by referee stoppage	Singles match	10:11
4	World Titan Federation (Davey Boy Smith Jr. and Tom Lawlor) (with Mister Saint Laurent) defeated The Second Gear Crew (Matthew Justice and 1 Called Manders) (c) by pinfall	Tag team match for the MLW World Tag Team Championship	11:18
5	Matt Riddle (c) defeated Bad Dude Tito by pinfall	Singles match for the NJPW World Television Championship	5:03
6	Janai Kai (with Salina de la Renta) defeated Zoey Cannon by referee stoppage	Singles match If Cannon had lasted with or beat Kai in 5 minutes, she would have won $5,000.	0:16
7	Satoshi Kojima (c) defeated Minoru Suzuki by pinfall	Singles match for the MLW World Heavyweight Championship	16:25
(c) / – the champion(s) heading into the match

Once Upon A Time In New York (March 16)
No.	Results	Stipulations	Times
1	Brett Ryan Gosselin (with Zayda) defeated Dyln McKay, Cannonball, Marcus Mathers, Love, Doug and Ichiban by pinfall	Six-way scramble	6:16
2	Bad Dude Tito (with Jesus Rodriguez and Salina de la Renta) defeated Azteca Sesenta y Seis by pinfall	Singles match	1:24
3	A. J. Franci$ (with Mister Saint Laurent) defeated Mr. Thomas (with The Bomaye Fight Club (Alex Kane and Faye Jackson)) by pinfall	Singles match	2:22
4	Delmi Exo (with Cesar Duran) defeated Zayda (with Brett Ryan Gosselin) by pinfall	Singles match to determine the #1 contender to the MLW World Women's Featherweight Championship	4:17
5	Matt Riddle defeated Davey Boy Smith Jr. (with Josh Bishop) by pinfall	Singles match	11:55
6	Star Jr. (with Salina de la Renta) defeated Magnus (with Cesar Duran) by pinfall	Singles match	8:34
7	Alex Kane and CozyMax (Shigeo Okumura and Satoshi Kojima) defeated World Titan Federation (Josh Bishop, Richard Holliday and Tom Lawlor) (with Mister Saint Laurent) by pinfall	Six-man tag team match	9:50
