= War Chamber (2024) =

2024 Major League Wrestling event

- Promotional poster of the event
- Promotion: Major League Wrestling
- Date: March 29, 2024
- City: St. Petersburg, Florida
- Venue: The Coliseum
- Attendance: 1,000-1,500

Event chronology
← Previous; Intimidation Games	Next → Azteca Lucha

War Chamber chronology
← Previous; 2023	Next → 2025

War Chamber (2024) was a professional wrestling event produced by Major League Wrestling (MLW). It took place on March 29, 2024, at The Coliseum in St. Petersburg, Florida, and was streamed live on Triller TV. It was the fourth event under the War Chamber chronology, the first War Chamber event to air live, and the first MLW event since WarGames in 2018 to have a version of the WarGames match contested inside a two-ring steel cage.

Additional matches were taped for MLW's "War Chamber II" special, which aired on BeIN Sports USA and MLW's YouTube channel on April 20, 2024.

== Production ==
=== Background ===
Other on-screen personnel
Role:	Name:
Commentators	Joe Dombrowski
Commentators	Matt Striker
Commentators	Saint Laurent
Commentators	AJ Francis
Commentators	Salina de la Renta

The first War Chamber event was held on September 7, 2019, as replacement for MLW WarGames, which was discontinued after WWE acquired the rights to the trademark of the namesake WarGames match. On January 2, 2024, MLW announced that it would be holding War Chamber on March 29, 2024, at The Coliseum in St. Petersburg, Florida.

=== Storylines ===
The card will consist of matches that result from scripted storylines, where wrestlers portray villains, heroes, or less distinguishable characters in scripted events that built tension and culminate in a wrestling match or series of matches, with results predetermined by MLW's writers. Storylines are played out across the league's social media platforms.

Per MLW's "Open Door Policy," several free agents will appear at the event. Names include former World Wonder Ring Stardom wrestler Unagi Sayaka and New Japan Pro-Wrestling's Kosei Fujita.

==== War Chamber ====
For nearly a year, Mister Saint Laurent, former MLW color commentator and Vice President of Operations, had been trying to take over the promotion with his "World Titan Federation" (WTF) stable. MSL would lure away wrestlers such as Davey Boy Smith Jr., Tom Lawlor, Alexander Hammerstone, and Richard Holliday, as well as bring in former WWE stars like Matt Cardona and A. J. Franci$, in his attempts to undermine the company. These attempts included winning the MLW World Heavyweight Championship, but Cardona and Holliday would fail to take the title from then-champion Alex Kane at One Shot and Kings of Colosseum, respectively. During a media event in New York on March 4, MSL, Franci$, Lawlor, Holliday, and Brett Ryan Gosselin attacked the current champion, Satoshi Kojima, stealing the new version of the title belt that MLW CEO Court Bauer and Kane were to present to him. Kojima would suffer an ACL injury during the attack. In response, MLW announced a two-ring War Chamber match on their website, pitting Team MLW (represented by CozyMax (Kojima and Shigeo Okumura) and The Second Gear Crew (Matthew Justice and 1 Called Manders)) against WTF (MLW World Tag Team Champions Lawlor and Smith, Holliday, and Josh Bishop).

Over a year ago, Raven returned to MLW as the leader of "The Calling," a stable that had been attacking the MLW roster members for months, leaving only a calling card with the initials "AO." Among the members were Rickey Shane Page and Akira, who would win the MLW National Openweight Championship and MLW World Middleweight Championship respectively, as well as the MLW World Tag Team Championship together. While Raven was away, Page began to assert more power, and tensions between himself and Akira began after the latter lost his championship at MLW Slaughterhouse. After losing the tag titles at Fightland the following month, Akira was expelled from The Calling by Page. Since then, Akira would unsuccessfully challenge Page for the National Openweight Championship on multiple occasions. At Kings of Colosseum, Akira lost a Taipei Deathmatch due to interference from a returning Sami Callihan, who became The Calling's newest member. At SuperFight, after Akira was defeated by Callihan in a Death Machine Rules match, The Calling would attack Akira before Raven returned to save him. Raven and Akira would later be joined by Jake Crist, a former stablemate of Ohio Versus Everything with Callihan. Christ would challenge Page for his title during "The Burning Crush" special, which aired on February 17, in a losing effort. At Intimidation Games, Page and Callihan defeated Akira and Crist in a New York City Street Fight. The rest of The Calling would attack Akira and Crist before Jimmy Lloyd saved them. Raven then appeared on the video wall, accusing Page of stealing the name of The Calling from him, while calling his new group "The Response." MLW would soon announce a War Chamber match between The Calling (Page, Callihan, Cannonball, and Talon) and The Response (Raven, Akira, Crist, and Lloyd) for the TV taping portion of the event.

==== Other matches ====
During The Burning Crush, A. J. Franci$ via vignette interrupted a promo by Alex Kane to announce that he has joined the World Titan Federation and that would be coming to Intimidation Games. Franci$ would claim that he's already done everything for black people in pro wrestling that Kane has done, and that he can take Kane's Bomaye Fight Club to a new level. At Intimidation Games, Franci$ appeared in-person on the entrance stage after Kane's match to taunt the latter, saying that many in the Bomaye Fight Club aren't as loyal as Kane thinks they are. Franci$ was also with promoter Mister Saint Laurent when WTF attacked Satoshi Kojima during the New York media event on March 4; immediately getting into a brawl with Kane. Ten days later, MLW announced a match between Kane and Franci$ for War Chamber.

As part of the ongoing war between Salina de la Renta's Promociones Dorado and Cesar Duran's Azteca Lucha, the former has enlisted Star Jr. to compete at War Chamber against a mystery opponent selected by Duran, later revealed on MLW.com to be Virus, during the TV taping portion of the show. On March 19, MLW.com reported that Duran also has an offer for de la Renta, which he will reveal at the event.

== Results ==
War Chamber
No.	Results	Stipulations	Times
1	Janai Kai (c) (with Salina de la Renta) defeated Unagi Sayaka by pinfall	Singles match for the MLW World Women's Featherweight Championship	7:14
2	A. J. Franci$ (with Mister Saint Laurent) defeated Alex Kane (with Mr. Thomas) by pinfall	Singles match	7:02
3	Mads Krule Krügger (with Sentai Death Squad) defeated Brian Brock by pinfall	Singles match	3:43
4	Bad Dude Tito (with Salina de la Renta) defeated Richard Adonis by pinfall	Singles match	0:46
5	Matt Riddle (c) defeated Kosei Fujita by pinfall	Singles match for the NJPW World Television Championship	7:03
6	Team MLW (The Second Gear Crew (Matthew Justice and 1 Called Manders) and (CozyMax (Shigeo Okumura and Satoshi Kojima)) (with Bill Alfonso) defeated World Titan Federation (Tom Lawlor, Davey Boy Smith Jr., Richard Holliday, and Josh Bishop) (with Mister Saint Laurent) by pinfall	War Chamber match	24:36
(c) / – the champion(s) heading into the match

War Chamber II (April 20)
No.	Results	Stipulations	Times
1	Star Jr. (with Salina de la Renta) defeated Virus (with Cesar Duran) by submission	Singles match	6:58
2	Brett Ryan Gosselin (with Mister Saint Laurent) defeated Budd Heavy by pinfall	Singles match	0:41
3	World Titan Federation (Davey Boy Smith Jr. and Tom Lawlor) (c) (with Mister Saint Laurent) defeated The Bomaye Fight Club (Alex Kane and Mr. Thomas) by pinfall	Tag team match for the MLW World Tag Team Championship	5:03
4	Zayda defeated Sofi Castillo by pinfall	Singles match	5:48
5	Matt Riddle defeated Timothy Thatcher by pinfall	Singles match	11:09
6	Satoshi Kojima (c) defeated Bad Dude Tito (with Salina de la Renta) by pinfall	Singles match for the MLW World Heavyweight Championship	5:48
7	Death Fighters (Raven, Jake Crist, Jimmy Lloyd and Akira) defeated The Calling (Rickey Shane Page, Sami Callihan, Cannonball, and Dr. Cornwallis) by submission	War Chamber match	23:58
(c) / – the champion(s) heading into the match
