= Intimidation Games (2022) =

2022 Major League Wrestling event

- Promotion: Major League Wrestling
- Date: March 31, 2022 (aired April 28, 2022)
- City: Dallas, Texas
- Venue: Gilley's Dallas
- Attendance: 500-700

Event chronology
← Previous; SuperFight	Next → Azteca Underground

Intimidation Games chronology
← Previous; 2019	Next → 2024

Intimidation Games (2022) was a professional wrestling supercard event produced by Major League Wrestling (MLW), which took place on March 31, 2022, at Gilley's Dallas in Dallas, Texas. The event was a television taping for MLW Fusion on YouTube, with the main card airing as a special episode on April 28, 2022.

It was the third event under the Intimidation Games chronology, and the first of two MLW events to take place in Texas that weekend; the other being MLW Azteca Underground on April 1.

== Production ==
=== Background ===
Other on-screen personnel
Role:	Name:
Commentators	Joe Dombrowski
Commentators	Rich Bocchini
Ring announcers	Juba

On November 5, 2019, MLW.com announced that Intimidation Games would take place in Chicago on February 29, 2020. On December 10, however, the event was pushed back to April 18. Due to the COVID-19 pandemic, the event was once again rescheduled to June 5, 2021, and later, November 6, 2021, at the 2300 Arena in Philadelphia, Pennsylvania. On October 16, it was announced that War Chamber (2021) would take place on that date instead. Finally, on January 28, 2022, it was announced that Intimidation Games would take place at Gilley's Dallas in Dallas, Texas on March 31.

=== Storylines ===
The card consisted of matches that result from scripted storylines, where wrestlers portrayed villains, heroes, or less distinguishable characters in scripted events that built tension and culminated in a wrestling match or series of matches, with results predetermined by MLW's writers. Storylines were played out on MLW's television program Fusion.

Through MLW's "Open Door" policy, former MLW World Heavyweight Champion Shane Strickland, who last appeared for the promotion in 2019 (and would sign with All Elite Wrestling in March 2022) would return to MLW and align himself with Azteca Underground's Cesar Duran; Strickland previously performed in Lucha Underground under his "Killshot" persona. On the April 14, 2022 episode of Fusion, MLW World Middleweight Champion Myron Reed was attacked during a Five-way match for the MLW National Openweight Championship by a masked man. During the April 28, 2022 Intimidation Games special, Reed would challenge the assailant to a title match for the following week. Duran would reveal the attacker to be Strickland prior to the match, which would air on the May 6th episode.

On the February 10, 2022 Fusion season premiere, Richard Holliday and MLW interviewer Alicia Atout attacked MLW World Heavyweight Champion and Dynasty stablemate Alexander Hammerstone after the latter's falls count anywhere title defense against Pagano. Two weeks later, it was revealed at the end of the February 24 episode of Fusion that Holiday had been working with Cesar Duran to defeat Contra Unit (including joining "The Hammerheads" team against Contra at the 2021 War Chamber match) in order to help the latter gain more power in MLW in exchange for a World title shot. Despite Davey Richards winning the 2021 Opera Cup and earning a title match against Hammerstone at SuperFight, Duran informed Holiday that there is a provision if Richards were to be injured. This led Holliday and Atout to put a bounty on Davey Richards on the March 4 episode of Fusion, with Hammerstone helping Richards fend off Homicide, the Saito Brothers (representing All Japan Pro Wrestling), and King Muertes. Richards would challenge Hammerstone for the championship at SuperFight, but was unsuccessful. On the day of Intimidation Games, it was announced that Holliday and Richards will face off at the event.

In late-2020, then-reigning MLW National Openweight Champion Alexander Hammerstone pursued the MLW World Heavyweight Championship, then held by Contra Unit's Jacob Fatu. Throughout that season of Fusion, Hammerstone would be targeted by Contra's new member, Mads Krügger. Hammerstone defended the National Openweight title against Krügger at Kings of Colosseum to a double countout, and in a Baklei Brawl on the February 3, 2021 Fusion. Near the end of the season, Contra Unit leader Josef Samael ultimately refused Hammerstone a title match with Fatu, as he alone controlled when and who Fatu would defend the world title against. To circumvent this, Hammerstone would enter and win Battle Riot III in July, last eliminating Krügger to earn a shot at Fatu. At Fightland, Hammerstone would defeat Fatu in a title vs. title no disqualification match to win the MLW World Heavyweight Champion. Weeks later, on Fusion: Alpha, when Fatu confronted MLW matchmaker and Azteca Underground owner Cesar Duran for a rematch, he was informed that Fatu's champion contract also stated that Samael controlled Fatu's potential rematches, and had not invoked the clause. By then, Contra began to show signs of dissolution, with Krügger claiming himself to be the leader of the group. At War Chamber, The Hammerheads (Hammerstone, Richard Holliday, EJ Nduka, Savio Vega, and Matanza Duran) defeated Contra Unit (Fatu, Krügger, Ikuro Kwon, and two Sentai Death Squad soldiers) in the titular match. After the match, Krügger blamed Fatu for the loss, and Fatu would respond by attacking Krügger and turning face. Contra Unit would disband in the aftermath, with most of its members going AWOL. Fatu and Krügger would feud in the months since; Fatu would earn the first win on the February 24, 2022 Fusion, while Krügger won their Stairway to Hell rematch on March 24. On March 31, MLW announced that Hammerstone will defend the MLW World Heavyweight Championship against both Fatu and Krügger in a three-way match at Intimidation Games.

== Results ==
No.	Results	Stipulations	Times
1	Matt Cross defeated TJP	Singles match	11:07
2	Richard Holliday (with Alicia Atout) defeated Davey Richards	Singles match	9:39
3	Hustle and Power (EJ Nduka and Calvin Tankman) (c) defeated The Bomaye Fight Club (Alex Kane and Mr. Thomas)	Tag team match for the MLW World Tag Team Championship	7:26
4	nZo defeated A. C. H.	Singles match	6:21
5	Alexander Hammerstone (c) defeated Jacob Fatu and Mads Krügger	Three-way match for the MLW World Heavyweight Championship	13:44
6	Los Parks (L.A. Park and L.A. Park Jr.) defeated Gangrel and Pagano	Mexican Death tag team match	10:53
7	Octagón Jr. defeated King Muertes (c), El Dragón, and El Hijo de L.A. Park	Cyclone match for the MLW Caribbean Heavyweight Championship	9:26
8	Myron Reed (c) defeated Swerve Strickland	Singles match for the MLW World Middleweight Championship	7:54
9	Strange Sangre (Arez, Gino Medina and Mini Abismo Negro) defeated Aramis, KC Navarro, and Micro Man	Trios match	11:55
10	Holidead (with Dr. Dax and Gangrel) defeated Shazza McKenzie	Singles match	5:04
11	The Von Erichs (Marshall Von Erich and Ross Von Erich) defeated 5150 (Danny Rivera and Hernandez)	Bunkhouse Brawl	9:42
(c) / – the champion(s) heading into the match
