= SuperFight (2024) =

2024 Major League Wrestling event

- Promotional poster featuring various wrestlers
- Promotion: Major League Wrestling
- Date: February 3, 2024
- City: Philadelphia, Pennsylvania
- Venue: 2300 Arena
- Attendance: 772

Event chronology
← Previous; Kings of Colosseum	Next → Intimidation Games

SuperFight chronology
← Previous; 2023	Next → 6

SuperFight (2024) was a professional wrestling pay-per-view event produced by Major League Wrestling (MLW). It took place on February 3, 2024, at the 2300 Arena in Philadelphia, Pennsylvania, and was streamed live on Triller TV. It was the fourth event under the SuperFight chronology.

Additional matches were taped for MLW's "The Burning Crush", a free special which aired on BeIN Sports USA and MLW's YouTube channel on February 17.

== Production ==
=== Background ===
Other on-screen personnel
Role:	Name:
Commentators	Joe Dombrowski
Commentators	Christian Cole

SuperFight is a professional wrestling supercard event produced by Major League Wrestling. The first event was broadcast as a special live episode of Fusion that aired on February 2, 2019; the second live special in the show's history. The second event, Saturday Night SuperFight, was held later that year on November 2 as MLW's first-ever pay-per-view card.

On December 11, 2023, it was announced that SuperFight would be taking place on February 3, 2024, at the 2300 Arena in Philadelphia, Pennsylvania. As part of MLW's partnership with Triller TV to produce live specials for TrillerTV+ subscribers, the 2024 edition will also be the first to air live since 2019.

=== Storylines ===
The card consisted of matches that result from scripted storylines, where wrestlers portray villains, heroes, or less distinguishable characters in scripted events that built tension and culminate in a wrestling match or series of matches, with results predetermined by MLW's writers. Storylines are played out across the league's social media platforms.

Per MLW's "Open Door Policy," several freelancers would be announced for SuperFight. Several wrestlers from partner promotion Consejo Mundial de Lucha Libre (CMLL) and New Japan Pro-Wrestling (NJPW) will also appear. Names include Místico, Averno, Shigeo Okumura, and Yuji Nagata.

After Alex Kane successfully defended the MLW World Heavyweight Championship at Kings of Colosseum, his next challenger was announced to be former world champion Satoshi Kojima. Their title match would be set for SuperFight.

At Kings of Colosseum, former tag team partners and stablemates Akira and Rickey Shane Page of The Calling faced in a Taipei Deathmatch for the latter's MLW National Openweight Championship. In the closing moments, Akira would suffer from interference by a returning Sami Callihan which would cost him the match. In a promo after the match, an irate Akira put a challenge out to Callihan for a match at SuperFight, which was made official, but under "Death Machine Rules."

For months, Ichiban had been trying to gain an MLW World Middleweight Championship match but was constantly shot down by champion Rocky Romero and Promociones Dorado promoter Salina de la Renta. At Fightland, Ichiban would team with Máscara Dorada to defeat Romero and Bárbaro Cavernario. During the Holiday Rush special aired on December 23, 2023, Ichiban would face de la Renta in an intergender match, which he won by disqualification due to run-ins by Promociones Dorado. Regardless, per pre-match stipulations, Ichiban finally earned a title opportunity against Romero, which was made for SuperFight in a two-out-of-three falls match.

== Results ==
SuperFight
No.	Results	Stipulations	Times
1	Rocky Romero (c) (with Promociones Dorado (Jesús Rodriguez and Salina de la Renta)) defeated Ichiban 2–1	Two-out-of-three falls match for the MLW World Middleweight Championship	16:17
2	Davey Boy Smith Jr. (with Mister Saint Laurent) defeated 1 Called Manders by submission	Singles match	9:41
3	Jacob Fatu defeated Yuji Nagata by pinfall	Singles match	9:01
4	Sami Callihan defeated Akira by pinfall	Death Machine Rules match	13:34
5	Místico (with Cesar Duran) defeated Averno (with Promociones Dorado (Jesús Rodriguez and Salina de la Renta)) by pinfall	Singles match	14:42
6	Satoshi Kojima (with Shigeo Okumura) defeated Alex Kane (c) (with The Bomaye Fight Club (Faye Jackson and Mr. Thomas)) by pinfall	Singles match for the MLW World Heavyweight Championship	11:20
(c) / – the champion(s) heading into the match

The Burning Crush (February 17)
No.	Results	Stipulations	Times
1	The Dirty Ass Bastards (TJ Crawford, Griffin McCoy and Tony Deppen) defeated Nolo Kitano and Wasted Youth (Marcus Mathers and Austin Luke) by pinfall	Six-man tag team match	6:38
2	Zayda (with Brett Ryan Gosselin) defeated Delmi Exo, Notorious Mimi, and Tiara James by pinfall	Four-way match	5:00
3	Jake Crist defeated Rickey Shane Page (c) (with The Calling (Dr. Cornwallis, Cannonball, and Talon)) by disqualification	Singles match for the MLW National Openweight Championship	4:36
4	Tom Lawlor (with Mister Saint Laurent) defeated Matthew Justice by pinfall	Singles match	7:35
5	Brett Ryan Gosselin (with Zayda) defeated Love, Doug by pinfall	Lumber Jack and Jill match	4:05
6	CozyMax (Shigeo Okumura and Satoshi Kojima) defeated World Titan Federation (Davey Boy Smith Jr. and Richard Holliday) (with Mister Saint Laurent) by pinfall	Tag team match	7:35
7	Mads Krule Krügger defeated Jacob Fatu by pinfall	Baklei Brawl	11:56
(c) / – the champion(s) heading into the match
