= SuperFight 6 =

2025 Major League Wrestling event

- Promotional poster of the event
- Promotion: Major League Wrestling
- Date: February 8, 2025
- City: Atlanta, Georgia
- Venue: Center Stage
- Attendance: 772

Event chronology
← Previous; Kings of Colosseum	Next → Battle Riot VII

SuperFight chronology
← Previous; 2024	Next → Saturday Night SuperFight

SuperFight 6 was a professional wrestling event produced by Major League Wrestling (MLW). It took place on February 8, 2025, at the Center Stage in Atlanta, Georgia. It was the sixth event under the SuperFight chronology. The event streamed live on MLW's YouTube channel, with additional matches being taped for the Intimidation Games special, which aired on March 8 on BeIN Sports USA and YouTube.

== Production ==
=== Background ===
SuperFight is a professional wrestling supercard event produced by Major League Wrestling. The first event was broadcast as a special live episode of Fusion that aired on February 2, 2019; the second live special in the show's history. The second event, Saturday Night SuperFight, was held later that year on November 2 as MLW's first-ever pay-per-view card.

On October 18, 2024, it was announced that SuperFight 6 would be taking place on February 8, 2025, at the Center Stage in Atlanta, Georgia.

=== Storylines ===
The card consisted of matches that result from scripted storylines, where wrestlers portray villains, heroes, or less distinguishable characters in scripted events that built tension and culminate in a wrestling match or series of matches, with results predetermined by MLW's writers. Storylines are played out across the league's social media platforms.

At the end of Eric Bischoff's One Shot, executive producer for the night Eric Bischoff was seen on the phone while holding what seemed to be company documents. Bischoff would be seen again in MLW via satellite at Kings of Colosseum, supposedly to address whatever plans he had for MLW. However, Bischoff kept those details private, instead discussing that he would continue collaborating with MLW by acting as executive producer of SuperFight 6.

At the previous year's SuperFight, Satoshi Kojima defeated Alex Kane to win the MLW World Heavyweight Championship. The two would not have a rematch for the rest of the year, however, as both were preoccupied in feuds with the World Titan Federation (WTF), the returning Contra Unit, and the Rogue Horsemen. At Battle Riot VI, Matt Riddle, who had returned to MLW earlier that year, won the titular match to earn a world title match whenever and wherever he wanted. Riddle would go on to align with Kojima against Contra Unit while defending his title opportunity against the likes of Sami Callihan, Tom Lawlor, and Donovan Dijak. Riddle would then challenge Kojima for the MLW World Heavyweight Championship at Kings of Colosseum, where he would win the title. Kane, on the other hand, was "fired" by Eric Bischoff at One Shot the previous month. At the post-show press conference for Kings of Colosseum, Riddle declared that he would defend his newly won title against both Kojima and Kane in a three-way match at SuperFight 6, citing Kane's overdue rematch clause and MLW's "Open Door Policy" to grant him an opportunity. MLW would officially announce the match on their website moments later.

At Pit Fighters, Matt Riddle defeated WTF member Tom Lawlor in a Vale Tudo Rules match. Afterwards, Lawlor's promoter Saint Laurent berated him for being a failure and fired him from the WTF before unleashing his new main charge Donovan Dijak on Lawlor. Dijak would go on to call out various shootfighters and martial artists in wrestling as "fake" and dared any to face him. Lawlor, meanwhile, would form an alliance with Riddle as the "Filthy Bros," as he and Dijak would get into various altercations at MLW events. On January 16, 2025, MLW announced a grudge match between Dijak and Lawlor was set for SuperFight 6.

At Summer of the Beasts, Brett Ryan Gosselin (BRG) defeated Paul London before he and Bobby Fish continued to beat down London. The Andersons (C. W. Anderson and Brock Anderson) came out to initially intervene but then joined in the assault on London. BRG, Fish, and the Andersons would go on to form the "Rogue Horsemen," a spiritual successor to The Xtreme Horsemen from MLW's initial run. London would be sidelined for nearly three months before coming into conflict again with the Rogue Horsemen. On January 20, MLW announced that London would face BRG at SuperFight 6 in the company's first "Honey Trap match," where the loser would be forced into a pool of honey and then covered in feathers.

== Results ==
SuperFight 6
No.	Results	Stipulations	Times
1	Templario and Esfinge defeated Místico and Máscara Dorada by pinfall	Tag team match	13:19
2	Kenta defeated Kevin Knight by pinfall	Singles match	15:07
3	Paul London defeated Brett Ryan Gosselin by pinfall	Honey Trap match	5:02
4	Donovan Dijak (with Saint Laurent) defeated Tom Lawlor by pinfall	Singles match	15:24
5	Janai Kai defeated Mila Moore by submission	Singles match	2:28
6	Matt Riddle (c) defeated Satoshi Kojima and Alex Kane by pinfall	Three-way match for the MLW World Heavyweight Championship	7:29
(c) / – the champion(s) heading into the match

Intimidation Games (March 8)
No.	Results	Stipulations	Times
1	Okumura defeated Ariel Dominguez by pinfall	Singles match	3:24
2	The Bomaye Fight Club (Alex Kane and Mr. Thomas) defeated The Andersons (Brock Anderson and C. W. Anderson)	First Blood tag team match	5:42
3	Delmi Exo (c) defeated Tara Zep by pinfall	Singles match for the MLW World Women's Featherweight Championship	3:30
4	Matthew Justice (c) defeated Akira, Bobby Fish, and Paul Walter Hauser by pinfall	Four-way match for the MLW National Openweight Championship	9:23
5	Kushida defeated Neón by submission	Singles match	10:32
6	Filthy Bros (Matt Riddle and Tom Lawlor) vs. Contra Unit (Mads Krule Krügger and Ikuro Kwon) ended in a no contest	Tag team match	13:13
(c) / – the champion(s) heading into the match
