= Intimidation Games (2019) =

2019 Major League Wrestling event

- Promotion: Major League Wrestling
- Date: March 2, 2019
- City: Cicero, Illinois
- Venue: Cicero Stadium
- Attendance: 2,100

Event chronology
← Previous; SuperFight	Next → Rise of the Renegades

Intimidation Games chronology
← Previous; 2018	Next → 2022

MLW Fusion special episodes chronology
← Previous; SuperFight	Next → Battle Riot II

Intimidation Games (2019) was a professional wrestling supercard event produced by Major League Wrestling (MLW), which took place on March 2, 2019 at the Cicero Stadium in Cicero, Illinois. The event aired live on television as a special episode of Fusion on beIN Sports. It was the second event under the Intimidation Games chronology.

Fourteen matches were contested at the event, with two matches airing live. The main event of the live broadcast was a steel cage match, in which Tom Lawlor retained the MLW World Heavyweight Championship against Low Ki. The undercard featured a lucha libre tag team match between The Lucha Brothers (Pentagon Jr. and Rey Fenix) and Team AAA (Laredo Kid and Taurus). The event also featured the television debut of Contra Unit and marked the beginning of the lengthy rivalry between Tom Lawlor and Contra Unit.

== Production ==
=== Background ===
On November 7, 2018, MLW.com announced that MLW would hold an event in Chicago on March 2, 2019 titled Intimidation Games, which was first held as a television taping for Fusion on May 3, 2018. After the SuperFight event in February 2019, MLW announced that it would produce Intimidation Games as a live televised special episode of Fusion on beIN Sports on March 2.

=== Storylines ===
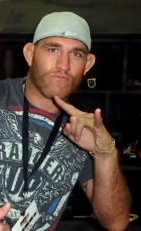
Tom Lawlor was the defending MLW World Heavyweight Champion heading into the event.

The card consisted of matches that resulted from scripted storylines, where wrestlers portrayed villains, heroes, or less distinguishable characters in scripted events that built tension and culminated in a wrestling match or series of matches, with results predetermined by MLW's writers. Storylines were played out on MLW's television program Fusion.

At SuperFight, Tom Lawlor cashed in his Battle Riot opportunity to defeat Low Ki to win the MLW World Heavyweight Championship. On February 13, MLW.com reported that Low Ki's manager Salina de la Renta had invoked a rematch clause for Low Ki at Intimidation Games, where Lawlor would defend the title against Low Ki in a steel cage match.

At SuperFight, Lucha Brothers lost the MLW World Tag Team Championship to The Hart Foundation. On February 11, MLW.com announced that Lucha Brothers would be facing Lucha Libre AAA Worldwide representatives Laredo Kid and Taurus in a lucha libre tag team match at Intimidation Games.

== Event ==
The first match was a lucha libre tag team match between The Lucha Brothers (Pentagon Jr. and Rey Fenix) and Team AAA (Laredo Kid and Taurus). Pentagon and Fenix superkicked Taurus and then nailed a springboard package piledriver on Laredo for the win.

Next was the main event steel cage match, in which Tom Lawlor defended the World Heavyweight Championship against Low Ki. Near the climax of the match, both men fought on the cage top and tried to escape the cage and traded punches and kicks until both of them fell to the floor but Lawlor's feet touched first and he was declared as the winner. After the match, Lawlor's former teammate Simon Gotch attacked him and the debuting Jacob Fatu and Josef Samael joined Gotch in attacking Lawlor and the three declared themselves Contra Unit and covered Lawlor in a customized Contra flag.

== Aftermath ==
Contra Unit began a lengthy feud with Tom Lawlor, which resulted in the group attacking him on many occasions over the next few months. This set up a title match between Lawlor and Contra Unit member Jacob Fatu at Kings of Colosseum.

== Results ==
No.	Results	Stipulations
1	Alexander Hammerstone defeated Isaias Velazquez	Singles match
2	Teddy Hart (c) defeated Myron Reed	Singles match for the MLW World Middleweight Championship
3	The Lucha Brothers (Pentagon Jr. and Rey Fenix) defeated Team AAA (Laredo Kid and Taurus)	Tag team match
4	Tom Lawlor (c) defeated Low Ki (with Salina de la Renta)	Steel cage match for the MLW World Heavyweight Championship
5	Ace Romero defeated Simon Gotch by disqualification	Singles match
6	Ricky Martinez (with Salina de la Renta) defeated Air Wolf	Singles match
7	Ace Austin defeated DJZ	Battle Riot qualifying match
8	Chico Adams and Vertigo Rivera defeated Contra Unit (Jacob Fatu and Josef Samael) by disqualification	Tag team match
9	Daga defeated Ariel Dominguez	Singles match
10	Puma King defeated El Hijo de LA Park (with Salina de la Renta)	Singles match
11	The Hart Foundation (Davey Boy Smith Jr. and Teddy Hart) (with Brian Pillman Jr.) defeated The Dynasty (Maxwell Jacob Friedman and Richard Holliday) by disqualification	Tag team match for the MLW World Tag Team Championship
12	Gringo Loco defeated Myron Reed	Singles match
13	Alexander Hammerstone (with Maxwell Jacob Friedman and Richard Holliday) defeated Brian Pillman Jr.	Singles match
14	L.A. Park (with Salina de la Renta) defeated Mance Warner	Death match
(c) / – the champion(s) heading into the match
