= MLW SuperFight =

SuperFight
- Promotions: Major League Wrestling
- First event: SuperFight (2019)

SuperFight is an annual professional wrestling supercard event produced by Major League Wrestling (MLW).

The first event was broadcast as a special live episode of MLW Fusion in 2019; the second live special in the show's history. The second event, Saturday Night SuperFight, was held later that year as MLW's first-ever pay-per-view. SuperFight has since been described as a "landmark, mega event" for the promotion.

== Dates and venues ==
| Aired live |

| # | Event | Date | City | Venue | Main event |
|---|---|---|---|---|---|
| 1 | SuperFight (2019) | February 2, 2019 | Philadelphia, Pennsylvania | 2300 Arena | Low Ki (c) vs. Tom Lawlor for the MLW World Heavyweight Championship |
| 2 | Saturday Night SuperFight | November 2, 2019 | Cicero, Illinois | Cicero Stadium | Jacob Fatu (c) vs. L. A. Park for the MLW World Heavyweight Championship |
| 3 | SuperFight (2022) | February 26, 2022 | Charlotte, North Carolina | Grady Cole Center | The Von Erichs (Marshall Von Erich and Ross Von Erich) vs. The Mortons (Ricky Morton and Kerry Morton) |
| 4 | SuperFight (2023) | February 4, 2023 | Philadelphia, Pennsylvania | 2300 Arena | Matthew Justice vs. Microman vs. Mance Warner vs. Real1 in a Dumpster match |
| 5 | SuperFight (2024) | February 3, 2024 | Philadelphia, Pennsylvania | 2300 Arena | Alex Kane (c) vs. Satoshi Kojima for the MLW World Heavyweight Championship. |
| 6 | SuperFight 6 | February 8, 2025 | Atlanta, Georgia | Center Stage | Matt Riddle (c) vs. Satoshi Kojima vs. Alex Kane for the MLW World Heavyweight Championship. |
| 7 | Saturday Night SuperFight | November 7, 2026 | Cicero, Illinois | Cicero Stadium | Killer Kross (c) vs. Josh Bishop in a Last Man Standing match for the MLW World Heavyweight Championship. |
