= Intimidation Games =

- Promotions: Major League Wrestling
- First event: Intimidation Games (2018)

Intimidation Games is a professional wrestling supercard event produced by Major League Wrestling (MLW) that was first held on May 3, 2018.

The first three events served as television tapings for MLW Fusion, with the second event airing as a special live episode.

== Dates and venues ==
Aired live

#	Event	Date	City	Venue	Main event
1	Intimidation Games (2018)	May 3, 2018	Orlando, Florida	Gilt Nightclub	Shane Strickland (c) vs. Pentagon Jr. for the MLW World Heavyweight Championship
2	Intimidation Games (2019)	March 2, 2019	Cicero, Illinois	Cicero Stadium	Tom Lawlor (c) vs. Low Ki in a steel cage match for the MLW World Heavyweight Championship
3	Intimidation Games (2022)	March 31, 2022	Dallas, Texas	Gilley's Dallas	The Von Erichs (Marshall Von Erich and Ross Von Erich) vs. 5150 (Danny Rivera and Hernandez) in a Bunkhouse Brawl
4	Intimidation Games (2024)	February 29, 2024	Queens, New York	Melrose Ballroom	Satoshi Kojima (c) vs. Minoru Suzuki for the MLW World Heavyweight Championship
4	Intimidation Games (2025)	March 8, 2025	Atlanta, Georgia	Center Stage	Filthy Bros (Matt Riddle and Tom Lawlor) vs. Contra Unit (Mads Krule Krügger and Ikuro Kwon)

== 2018 ==
Intimidation Games (2018)
- Promotion: Major League Wrestling
- Date: May 3, 2018
- City: Orlando, Florida
- Venue: Gilt Nightclub
- Attendance: 300

Event chronology
← Previous; The World Championship Finals	Next → Battle Riot I

Intimidation Games chronology
← Previous; First	Next → 2019

Intimidation Games (2018) was an event produced by Major League Wrestling (MLW) held on May 3, 2018, at the Gilt Nightclub in Orlando, Florida. The event was a television taping for MLW Fusion and it was the first event under the Intimidation Games chronology.

Results

No.	Results	Stipulations
1	Santana Garrett defeated Chelsea Green	Singles match
2	Simon Gotch (with Team Filthy) defeated Danny Santiago	Singles match Simon Gotch Prize Fight Challenge ($250 Prize)
3	The Stud Stable (Leo Brien, Mike Patrick and Parrow) defeated Rhett Giddins and Team TBD (Jason Cade and Jimmy Yuta)	Six-man tag team match
4	Maxwell Jacob Friedman defeated MVP	Singles match
5	Barrington Hughes defeated Danny Santiago	Singles match
6	Tom Lawlor defeated Fred Yehi	Singles match
7	Rich Swann defeated Kotto Brazil	Singles match
8	Sami Callihan (with Leon Scott and Sawyer Fulton) defeated Joey Janela (with Aria Blake)	Singles match
9	MVP defeated Leon Scott (with Sami Callihan and Sawyer Fulton) by disqualification	Singles match
10	Rey Fenix (with Salina de la Renta) defeated A. C. H.	Singles match
11	Jake Hager (with Col. Robert Parker) defeated Jeff Cobb	Singles match
12	Shane Strickland (c) defeated Pentagon Jr. (with Salina de la Renta)	Singles match for the MLW World Heavyweight Championship
(c) / – the champion(s) heading into the match
