= SuperFight (2022) =

2022 Major League Wrestling professional wrestling event

- Promotion: Major League Wrestling
- Date: February 26, 2022 (aired March 10, 2022)
- City: Charlotte, North Carolina
- Venue: Grady Cole Center
- Attendance: 800

Event chronology
← Previous; Blood & Thunder	Next → Intimidation Games

SuperFight chronology
← Previous; Saturday Night SuperFight	Next → 2023

SuperFight (2022) was a professional wrestling supercard event produced by Major League Wrestling (MLW), which took place on February 26, 2022, at the Grady Cole Center in Charlotte, North Carolina. The event was a television taping for MLW Fusion on YouTube, with the main event airing as a special episode on March 10, 2022, and it was the third event under the SuperFight chronology.

== Production ==
=== Background ===
Other on-screen personnel
Role:	Name:
Commentators	Joe Dombrowski
Commentators	Rich Bocchini
Ring announcers	Tim Barr

On December 23, 2021, MLW announced that it would be holding a SuperFight at the Grady Cole Center in Charlotte, North Carolina, on February 26, 2022. On February 2, MLW also announced that wrestling legend Ricky Steamboat had signed to be the matchmaker for the event.

=== Storylines ===
The supercard consisted of matches that result from scripted storylines, where wrestlers portrayed villains, heroes, or less distinguishable characters in scripted events that built tension and culminated in a wrestling match or series of matches, with results predetermined by MLW's writers.

As a part of MLW's "Open Door" policy", several free agents have been announced for SuperFight. Names include the returns of Killer Kross, Puma King, and Mini Abismo Negro. Additionally, father and son duo Ricky Morton and Kerry Morton, wrestling veteran Gangrel, and east coast indie star "Cashflow" Ken Broadway have been signed for the event.

On the December 1, 2021, episode of Fusion: Alpha, Davey Richards defeated TJP in the finals of the Opera Cup tournament. With this win, Richards would earn a shot at the MLW World Heavyweight Championship. On January 20, 2022, it was announced that Richards would challenge Alexander Hammerstone for the title at SuperFight.

Months after the dissolution of Contra Unit at War Chamber, former teammates Jacob Fatu and Mads Krügger would eventually face off in a grudge match on the February 24, 2022 episode of Fusion, where Fatu won. As part of SuperFight's double main event, announced on February 8, 2022, at MLW.com, Krügger will rematch Fatu in a Stairway to Hell Match. Both men have submitted a personal request for their weapons of use - a Baklei war club for Krügger, and a Maliliu Cane for Fatu.

On the December 9, 2021, episode of Fusion: Alpha, nZo made his MLW debut, defeating Matt Cross with a rope-assisted pin. After the match, KC Navarro made his entrance for his match against Gino Medina, only for nZo to attack and severely injure him. When confronted by correspondent Emilio Sparks about his actions, nZo claimed Navarro "snuffed" him when he passed by him on the entranceway, calling Navarro "disrespectful". nZo would be suspended soon after as a result of his actions. On February 9, 2022, MLW.com announced that Navarro and nZo would face each other in a grudge match at SuperFight.

== Results ==
No.	Results	Stipulations	Times
1	Ikuro Kwon defeated Ken Broadway	Singles match	2:26
2	Hustle & Power (E.J. Nduka and Calvin Tankman) defeated 5150 (Danny Rivera and Slice Boogie) (c) (with Dr. Julius Smokes)	Tag team match for the MLW World Tag Team Championship	8:08
3	Richard Holliday (with Alicia Atout) defeated Matt Cross	Singles match	6:44
4	nZo defeated KC Navarro	Singles match	2:48
5	Alexander Hammerstone (c) defeated Davey Richards	Singles match for the MLW World Heavyweight Championship	19:14
6	Octagón Jr., Puma King, and Micro Man defeated Strange Sangre (Arez, Gino Medina, and Mini Abismo Negro) (with Dr. Dax)	Trios match	15:42
7	Killer Kross defeated Budd Heavy by referee stoppage	Singles match	2:23
8	Gangrel defeated Gnarls Garvin	Singles match	10:35
9	Myron Reed (c) defeated TJP	Singles match for the MLW World Middleweight Championship	13:39
10	Alex Kane (c) (with Mr. Thomas) defeated A. C. H. and Calvin Tankman	Three-way match for the MLW National Openweight Championship	8:00
11	Mads Krügger defeated Jacob Fatu	Stairway to Hell Match	14:32
12	The Von Erichs (Marshall and Ross) defeated Ricky Morton and Kerry Morton	Tag team match	5:27
(c) / – the champion(s) heading into the match
