= SuperFight (2023) =

2023 Major League Wrestling professional wrestling event

- Promotional poster featuring Alexander Hammerstone and Jacob Fatu
- Promotion: Major League Wrestling
- Date: February 4, 2023
- City: Philadelphia, Pennsylvania
- Venue: 2300 Arena
- Attendance: 1,100

Event chronology
← Previous; Blood and Thunder	Next → Super Series

SuperFight chronology
← Previous; 2022	Next → 2024

SuperFight (2023) was a professional wrestling supercard event produced by Major League Wrestling (MLW), which took place on February 4, 2023, at the 2300 Arena in Philadelphia, Pennsylvania. It was the fourth event under the SuperFight chronology, and features wrestlers from MLW's partner promotion, Dragon Gate.

Originally a television taping for MLW Fusion, matches and segments from the event would also air on the promotion's new series, MLW Underground Wrestling.

== Production ==
=== Background ===
On January 9, 2023, MLW announced that it will be holding SuperFight at the 2300 Arena in Philadelphia, Pennsylvania, on February 4, 2023.

=== Storylines ===
The supercard will consist of matches that result from scripted storylines, where wrestlers portray villains, heroes, or less distinguishable characters in scripted events that build tension and culminated in a wrestling match or series of matches, with results predetermined by MLW's writers. Storylines are played out on MLW's main show, MLW Fusion, as well as the league's social media platforms.

Per MLW's "Open Door Policy," several independent wrestlers and free agents would be signed to appear at the event. Names include New England–based women's wrestler B3cca. The event will also feature the return of former MLW World Middleweight Champion Lio Rush.

As part of MLW's partnership with Dragon Gate, Open the Dream Gate Champions Natural Vibes (Big Boss Shimizu and Kzy) will defend their titles at SuperFight. Their opponents would be revealed as The FBI (Little Guido and Ray Jaz) on January 26.

At Battle Riot IV, Jacob Fatu last eliminated Real1 to win the titular match, earning a future MLW World Heavyweight Championship match at the time and place of his choosing. A few months later at Fightland, Fatu officially declared that he would challenge for the title, currently held by Alexander Hammerstone – who won the title from Fatu – at SuperFight. Hammerstone would confront Fatu thereafter and accepted his challenge, before the two men got into a pull-apart brawl. The match would be officially announced on MLW's website on January 11, 2023.

On the December 2, 2022, episode of Fusion, Alex Kane revealed he was in possession of the Opera Cup Trophy, which we now know he had stolen from Davey Richards the previous January. A month later at Blood and Thunder, Kane defeated Davey Boy Smith Jr., who accused him of stealing the trophy in the first place. On January 25, MLW announced that Kane and Smith will wrestle again at SuperFight in a no ropes catch wrestling match.

== Results ==
No.	Results	Stipulations	Times
1	Billie Starkz defeated B3cca	Singles match	—
2	Davey Boy Smith Jr. defeated Alex Kane (with Mr. Thomas)	No Ropes Catch Wrestling match	8:27
3	Johnny Fusion (c) (with Taya Valkyrie and Sam Adonis) defeated Willie Mack	Singles match for the MLW National Openweight Championship	12:55
4	Akira (with Raven) defeated Calvin Tankman	Singles match	5:59
5	Delmi Exo defeated B3cca	Singles match	3:30
6	Alexander Hammerstone (c) defeated Jacob Fatu	Singles match for the MLW World Heavyweight Championship	16:41
7	Sam Adonis defeated La Estrella	Singles match	—
8	Lince Dorado (c) defeated Delirious	Singles match for the MLW World Middleweight Championship	7:14
9	The Samoan SWAT Team (Lance Anoa'i and Juicy Finau) (c) defeated The Mane Event (Jay Lyons and Midas Black)	Tag team match for the MLW World Tag Team Championship	3:40
10	Lio Rush defeated Davey Richards	Singles match	—
11	Rickey Shane Page (with Raven and Akira) defeated 1 Called Manders	Hardcore match	9:02
12	Natural Vibes (Big Boss Shimizu and Kzy) (c) defeated The FBI (Little Guido and Ray Jaz)	Tag team match for the Open the Twin Gate Championship	4:12
13	Taya Valkyrie (c) (with Johnny Fusion and Sam Adonis) defeated Billie Starkz	Singles match for the MLW Women's World Featherweight Championship	7:28
14	Matthew Justice defeated Microman, Mance Warner, and Real1	Dumpster match Duke Droese was the special guest referee	8:24
(c) / – the champion(s) heading into the match
