= The Dynasty (professional wrestling) =

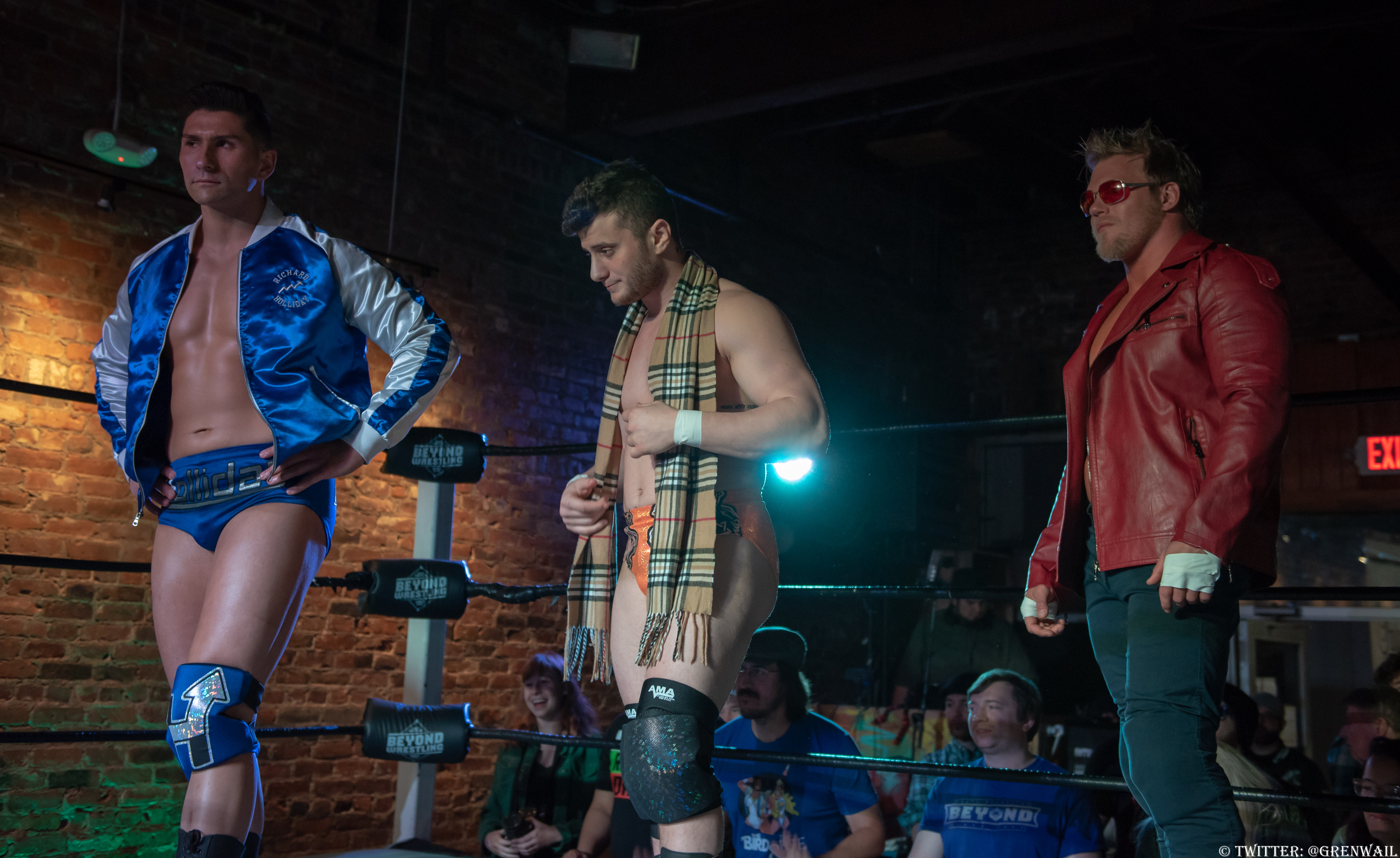
- Richard Holliday, Maxwell Jacob Friedman and Alexander Hammerstone in April 2019

Stable
- Members: Alexander Hammerstone; Maxwell Jacob Friedman; Richard Holliday; Gino Medina; Grogan; Aria Blake (valet)
- Debut: February 2, 2019
- Disbanded: January 21, 2022

The Dynasty was a professional wrestling faction in Major League Wrestling (MLW), which consisted of Alexander Hammerstone, Grogan, Gino Medina, Maxwell Jacob Friedman and Richard Holliday. It was originally formed as an alliance between MJF, Hammerstone and Holliday and slowly expanded to include MJF's valet Aria Blake, Gino Medina and Grogan. The group enjoyed championship success as Hammerstone held the World Heavyweight Championship and was the inaugural National Openweight Champion. Holliday was a former IWA Caribbean Heavyweight Champion while MJF and Holliday also won the World Tag Team Championship.

The group was formed at MLW's television taping on February 2, 2019, when Holliday attacked Hart Foundation member Teddy Hart after MJF lost a match to Hart. The duo of MJF and Holliday embarked on a lengthy feud with the Hart Foundation, during which Hammerstone joined the group and the trio gained championship success during the feud as Hammerstone was crowned the inaugural National Openweight Champion by defeating Brian Pillman Jr., while MJF and Holliday defeated Hart Foundation to win the World Tag Team Championship. Gino Medina joined the group on the December 5 television taping.

== History ==
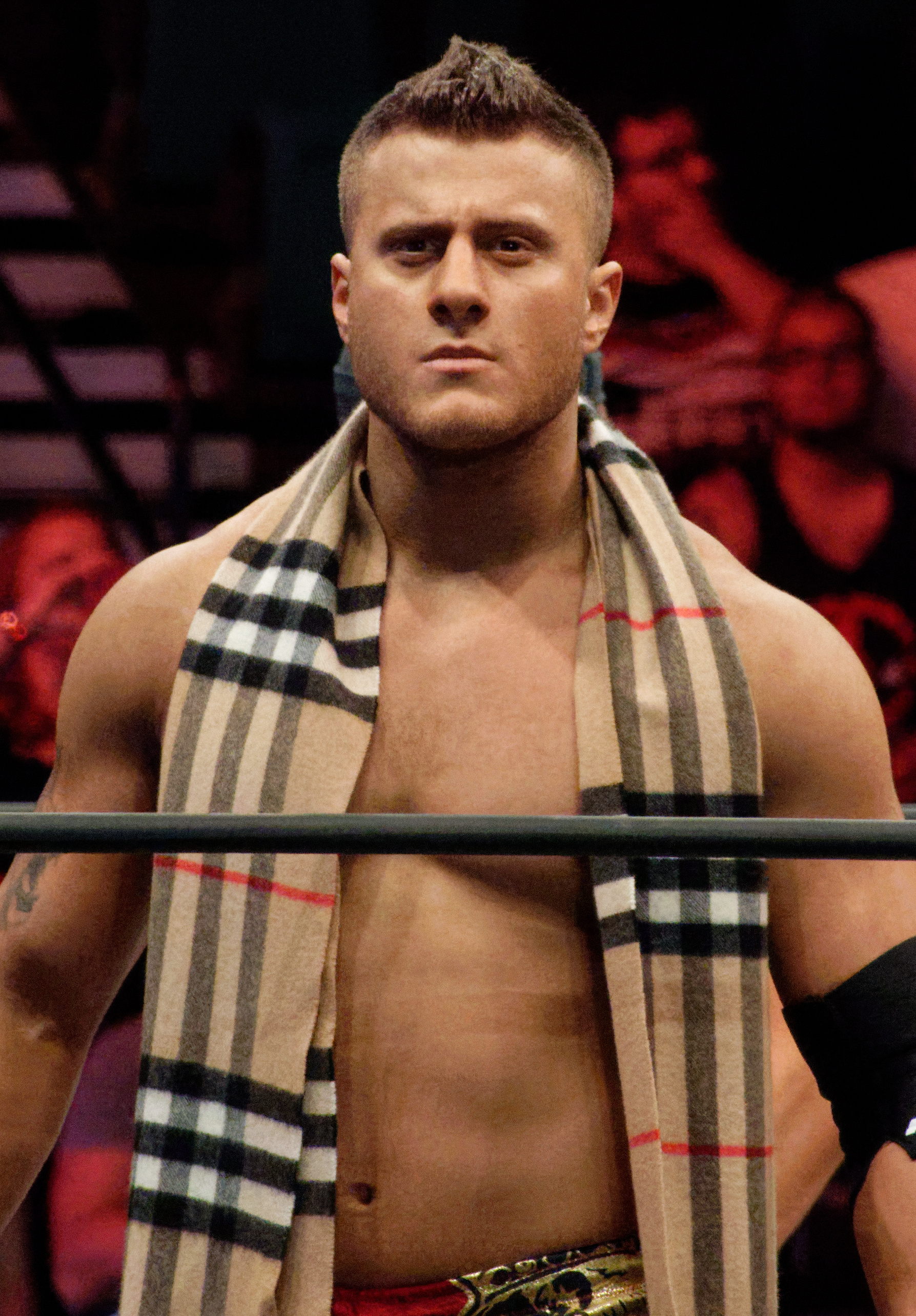
MJF

MJF was scheduled to defend the World Middleweight Championship in a five-way ladder match on the first-ever live episode of Fusion on December 14, 2018, but an elbow injury forced him to vacate the title. Hart Foundation member Teddy Hart would go on to win the vacant title. MJF's recovery time was expected to be four to six weeks. He returned to MLW in early 2019 and challenged Hart for the title on the February 16 episode of Fusion, which Hart retained. However, after the match, Richard Holliday joined MJF in attacking Hart during a post-match interview. Consequently, MJF and Holliday formed a team called "The Dynasty", which was first mentioned in an article on MLW.com on February 18. Dynasty began feuding with the Hart Foundation, which led to them challenging Hart and Davey Boy Smith Jr. to a match for the World Tag Team Championship on the March 16 episode of Fusion. MLW newcomer Alexander Hammerstone interfered in the match by attacking Hart and Smith, which led to a disqualification loss for Dynasty and therefore Hammerstone joined the Dynasty, making it a trio. On the April 27 episode of Fusion, Dynasty defeated Hart Foundation in a six-man tables match to hand Hart Foundation, their first loss as a team in MLW.

Dynasty continued its success against the Hart Foundation as Hammerstone defeated Brian Pillman Jr. in the finals of a tournament to become the inaugural National Openweight Champion at Fury Road. Hammerstone issued an open Star Sprangled Hammer Challenge for his title at Kings of Colosseum, which Kotto Brazil answered and Hammerstone retained the title. Immediately after the match, MJF and Holliday challenged Hart Foundation to a match for the World Tag Team Championship. On the July 13 episode of Fusion, MJF and Holliday defeated Pillman and Hart in a ladder match to capture the World Tag Team Championship. On the September 21 episode of Fusion, Dynasty retained the World Tag Team Championship against Hart and Smith in a two out of three falls match after Austin Aries interfered by attacking Hart, thus ending the feud between the two trios.

On the October 12 episode of Fusion, Hammerstone defended the National Openweight Championship against the Crash Heavyweight Champion Rey Horus in a winner takes all match, with Horus' title also on the line. Hammerstone retained the title by getting disqualified after MJF and Holliday attacked Horus and prevented him from beating Hammerstone. Later that night, Dynasty successfully defended the World Tag Team Championship against the Los Parks (LA Park and El Hijo de LA Park) in the main event. At MLW's first-ever pay-per-view event Saturday Night SuperFight, Hammerstone retained the National Openweight Championship against Hart Foundation member Davey Boy Smith Jr. while MJF and Holliday lost the World Tag Team Championship to The Von Erichs (Ross and Marshall) in a Texas Tornado match.

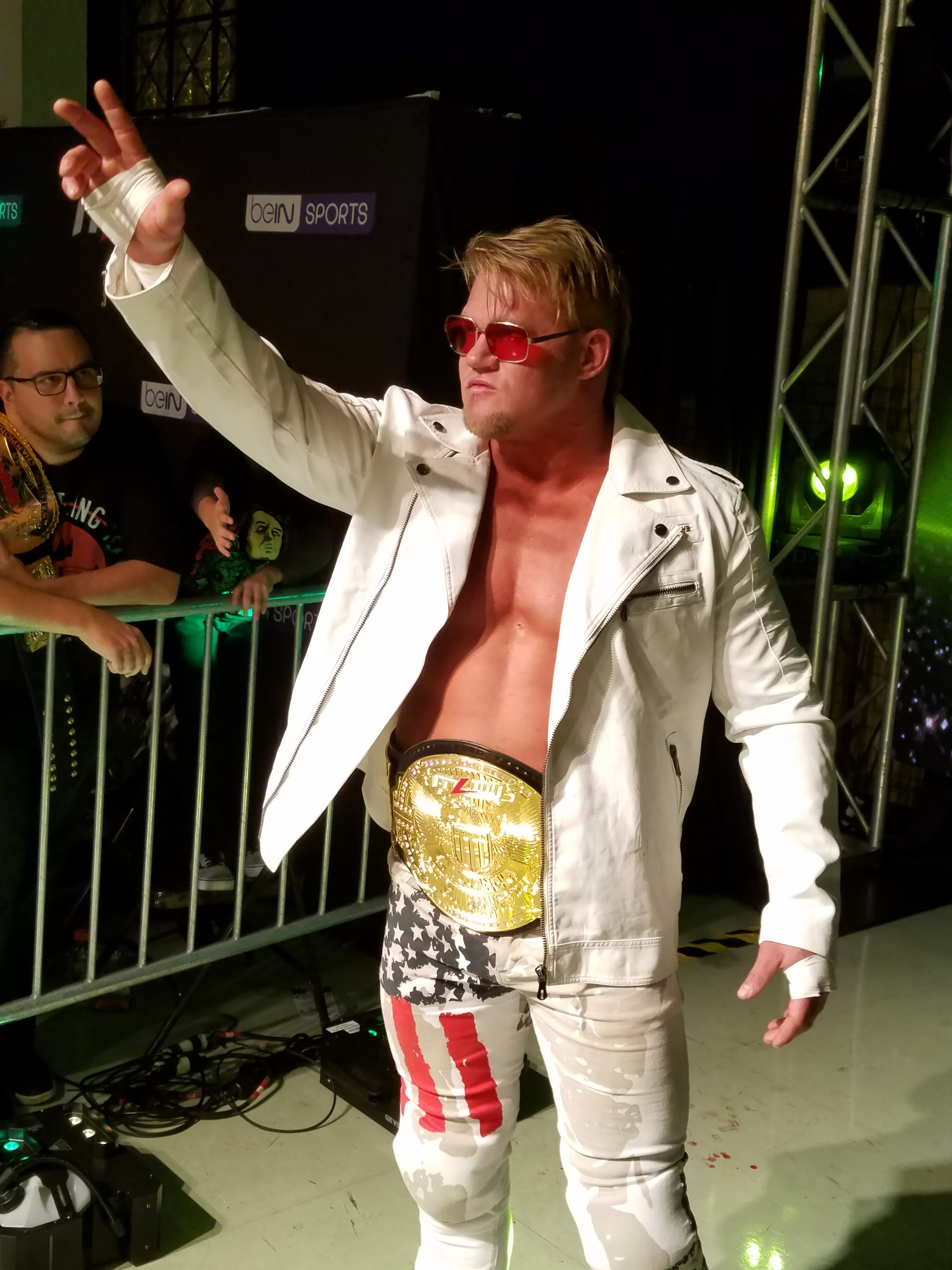
Alexander Hammerstone

On November 14, it was announced that Dynasty members MJF and Alexander Hammerstone would compete against each other in the opening round of the Opera Cup tournament despite protests by Richard Holliday. The duo met in the opening round on December 5, where Hammerstone defeated MJF to advance to the semi-final, where he lost to the eventual winner Davey Boy Smith Jr. Holliday also entered the tournament, losing to Timothy Thatcher in the opening round. During the same set of tapings, Gino Medina joined Dynasty by attacking Konnan while Konnan, Salina de la Renta and Dynasty all tried to recruit him. Dynasty would then help Medina defeat Savio Vega in a New York City Street Fight.

In January 2020, MJF departed from MLW and The Dynasty. Also, on the April 4, 2020 edition of MLW Fusion, MJF faced Mance Warner in a "Loser Leaves MLW" match, held in an empty arena. Warner won the match in under 10 minutes, and per the stipulation, MJF was forced to leave the promotion. On October 13, it was announced on MLW's website that Gino Medina has left The Dynasty.

On October 2, 2021, at Fightland, Hammerstone defeated Fatu, ending the latter's record setting reign at 819 days. On November 6 at War Chamber, The Dynasty along with EJ Nduka and Matanza Duran faced Contra Unit in a winning effort. On January 21, 2022, at Blood & Thunder, Holliday and his girlfriend Alicia Atout attacked Hammerstone, thus dissolving The Dynasty.

== Championships and accomplishments ==
- Major League Wrestling
  - IWA Caribbean Heavyweight Championship (1 time) – Holliday
  - MLW World Heavyweight Championship (1 time) – Hammerstone
  - MLW National Openweight Championship (1 time) – Hammerstone
  - MLW World Tag Team Championship (1 time) – MJF and Holliday
  - Mystery Box Battle Royal (2019) – Grogan
- Pro Wrestling Illustrated
  - Ranked MJF No. 22 of the top 500 singles wrestlers in the PWI 500 in 2020
  - Ranked Alexander Hammerstone No. 98 of the top 500 singles wrestlers in the PWI 500 in 2020
  - Ranked Richard Holliday No. 198 of the top 500 singles wrestlers in the PWI 500 in 2020
  - Ranked Gino Medina No. 426 of the top 500 singles wrestlers in the PWI 500 in 2020
