= New Era Hart Foundation =

Stable
- Name(s): New Era Hart Foundation; The New Hart Foundation; The Hart Foundation
- Former members: Teddy Hart; Davey Boy Smith Jr. Brian Pillman Jr.
- Debut: June 14, 2018
- Disbanded: December 2, 2020

New Era Hart Foundation (or simply The Hart Foundation) was a professional wrestling stable in Major League Wrestling, consisting of Teddy Hart, Davey Boy Smith Jr. and Brian Pillman Jr. The group was the latest incarnation of the Hart Foundation which was formed by MLW in 2018. The trio enjoyed success as they are former one-time World Tag Team Champions within the promotion, defending the title under the Freebird rule. In addition, Teddy Hart is a one-time World Middleweight Champion as part of the group. Hart was released by MLW on December 6, 2019 and Smith left the promotion on December 2, 2020, thus ending the group.

== History ==
=== Height of dominance (2018–2019) ===
On June 14, Major League Wrestling announced on its website that a new era incarnation of the famous Hart Foundation was going to begin which would consist of Hart family members Teddy Hart and Davey Boy Smith Jr. along with Brian Pillman Jr., the son of Brian Pillman, a former member of a previous incarnation of Hart Foundation. Pillman made his televised debut in MLW on the August 3 episode of Fusion, where he showed respect to Kevin Sullivan accepting him as his mentor. Hart Foundation made its debut on the August 17 episode of Fusion as a trio with Pillman acting as the cornerman of Hart and Smith, who defeated A. C. H. and Rich Swann after Pillman hit Swann with his cane. The trio established themselves as a villainous group and ranted against MLW management, which included Pillman turning on his mentor Kevin Sullivan and attacking him along with Hart and Smith on the August 31 episode of Fusion. Hart Foundation would dominate competition as they went on to defeat The Stud Stable and the team of ACH, Rich Swann and Marko Stunt on Fusion.

The team would soon find championship success as Hart won the vacant World Middleweight Championship by defeating Dezmond Xavier, El Hijo de L.A. Park, Gringo Loco and Kotto Brazil in a five-way ladder match on the first-ever live episode of Fusion on December 14. Pillman and Smith continued to succeed in tag team competition. The winning streak of Hart Foundation earned them a title shot for the World Tag Team Championship against The Lucha Brothers at SuperFight on February 2, 2019, which Smith and Hart won, thus making Hart a double champion. Pillman was also recognized as a champion via the Freebird rule, which required any two of the three members to defend the titles.

On the February 16 episode of Fusion, Hart successfully defended the World Middleweight Championship against MJF, after which Richard Holliday joined MJF in attacking Hart. As a result, Holliday and MJF formed an alliance called The Dynasty and began feuding with Hart Foundation, which led to Hart Foundation turning into a heroic stable. Smith and Hart defended the World Tag Team Championship against Dynasty on the March 16 episode of Fusion, where Dynasty was disqualified after Alexander Hammerstone joined Dynasty by attacking the Hart Foundation, beginning a lengthy feud between the two stables. On the April 27 episode of Fusion, Hart Foundation suffered their first loss as they were defeated by the Dynasty in a six-man tables match. Pillman and Hammerstone would qualify for the finals of a tournament to crown the inaugural National Openweight Champion at Fury Road, which Hammerstone won. Pillman and Hart would lose the titles to Dynasty in a ladder match on the July 13 episode of Fusion. Smith and Hart received a rematch for the titles in a two out of three falls match against the Dynasty on the September 21 episode of Fusion, in which they were unsuccessful due to interference by Austin Aries, who demanded a World Middleweight Championship title shot against Hart.

The three members of the Hart Foundation would go on to compete in separate singles matches at Saturday Night SuperFight, where Hart successfully defended the World Middleweight Championship against Austin Aries, Smith failed to win the National Openweight Championship from Alexander Hammerstone and Pillman lost to Low Ki.

=== Breakup and split (2019–2020) ===
On the November 11 episode of Fusion, Hart lost his title to Myron Reed after Contra Unit member Josef Samael threw a fireball on Hart. This would mark Hart's final appearance in MLW as he was released by the promotion on December 6. Smith and Pillman were both entered into the Opera Cup tournament, a family heirloom handed over to MLW management by Teddy Hart as the Opera Cup trophy had been won by his grandfather Stu Hart in 1948. Smith and Pillman made it to the final round of the tournament, which Smith won. Hart and Pillman went their separate ways afterwards until they reunited for one final match on the April 25, 2020 episode of Fusion by defeating Los Mercenarios (Texano Jr. and Rey Escorpión) in a tag team match, marking Hart Foundation's final appearance as a team.

The group finally disbanded when Smith left the company after losing to Low Ki in the opening round of the 2020 Opera Cup, thus disbanding Hart Foundation.

== Championships and accomplishments ==
- Major League Wrestling
  - MLW World Middleweight Championship (1 time) – Teddy Hart
  - MLW World Tag Team Championship (1 time) - Teddy Hart, Davey Boy Smith Jr, and Brian Pillman Jr
  - Opera Cup (2019) – Davey Boy Smith, Jr.
  - Wrestler of the Year (2018) – Teddy Hart
- Pro Wrestling Illustrated
  - Rookie of the Year (2019) – Brian Pillman, Jr.
  - Ranked Davey Boy Smith Jr. No. 253 of the top 500 singles wrestlers in the PWI 500 in 2018
  - Ranked Teddy Hart No. 301 of the top 500 singles wrestlers in the PWI 500 in 2019
  - Ranked Brian Pillman Jr. No. 411 of the top 500 singles wrestlers in the PWI 500 in 2019
