= IWA Puerto Rico/Caribbean Heavyweight Championship =

Details
- Promotion: International Wrestling Association of Puerto Rico; Major League Wrestling; Lucha Libre AAA Worldwide
- Date established: October 13, 2008
- Current champion: Salazar de la Muerte

Other names
- IWA Caribbean Heavyweight Championship (2008-2012); MLW Caribbean Heavyweight Championship / IWA PR/Caribbean Championship (2019-2022); IWA Puerto Rico Championship (2023-present)
Statistics
- Longest reign: Savio Vega (592 days)
- Shortest reign: Ash Rubynski (7 days)
- Oldest champion: Miguel Pérez Jr. (56 years, 358 days)
- Youngest champion: GQ The Ravishing (Richard Rondón) (28 years, 40 days)

The IWA Puerto Rico Championship (Campeonato de Puerto Rico de la IWA in Spanish) is a regional championship originally defended in the International Wrestling Association of Puerto Rico (IWA-PR), where it was a mid-tier title. When it was originally known as the IWA Caribbean Championship, it was some time unified with another secondary accolade, the original IWA Puerto Rico Heavyweight Championship. It was later reintroduced as a stand-alone title and deactivated when the promotion entered seven years of inactivity in 2012.

In 2019, the belt was revived and introduced to Major League Wrestling (MLW), as Savio Vega was announced as the “Caribbean Heavyweight Champion” upon making his debut. In 2020, Richard Holliday began a streak of unofficial defenses after taking possession of the belt following a non-title match. Story wise, the Caribbean Heavyweight Championship was not initially sanctioned by MLW, only acquiring affiliation as it became the centerpiece of the promotion's island event market expansion.

In 2023, IWA rebranded the IWA PR/Caribbean Championship title as the IWA Puerto Rico Championship.

The current champion is Salazar de la Muerte, who is in his first reign.

== History ==
=== Introduction (2008–2011) ===
Championship was announced on October 13, 2008 via IWA's website but it was not until February 14, 2009 at "Noche de Campeones" in Bayamón, Puerto Rico that it was determined a champion. The Inaugural champion was GQ The Ravishing (Richard Rondón), he won a 15 Man Tornado Rumble Match by last eliminating Cruzz.

=== Unified Puerto Rico Championship (2011–2012) ===
The championship would be unified with the IWA Puerto Rico Heavyweight Championship on February 26, 2011. On that match Xix Xavant defeated Romeo to unify the titles.

The Caribbean Heavyweight Championship was brought back in 2012 for the IWA/EWO Clash of the Titans show, a co-promoted one with another Puerto Rican Wrestling promotion called EWO. On this show, the winner of the match was Cyrus who won a 8 Man "Lucha X" Match where he defeated 8 participants who were.

=== Major League Wrestling (2019–2022) ===
Reintroduced as a regional third-party title (simply known as the “Caribbean Heavyweight Championship”) at Major League Wrestling in 2019, with Savio Vega billed as the current champion, the accolade was used to promote his arrival as part of Salina de la Renta’s Promociones Dorado (which he later left by ripping his contract). The incumbent was immediately given an opportunity for the MLW National Openweight Championship against Alexander Hammerstone of The Dynasty in what was branded an opportunity to become a double titlist, but ultimately saw the latter retain by cheating. Vega was given epithets such as “legendary” and “ the king of the Caribbean”, being matched against young performers including the members of latter group and Promociones Dorado. On January 11, 2020, Richard Holliday took possession of the belt after winning a non-title match, self-proclaiming himself champion.

As the disputed Caribbean Heavyweight Champion, Holliday was portrayed as a cowardly villain, who refused to participate in a titular match at Puerto Rico but was willing to make “defenses” in places such as “St. Barth's or Bermuda”. One such instance had him purportedly retain by defeating one Edwin González at Necker Island, a private island that is part of the British Virgin Islands. An unofficial defense took place at the MLW vs. AAA Super Series at Tijuana (Mexico being part of the larger Caribbean Basin), where Holliday defeated Chessman to give his team an early advantage. The belt played a role in selling the high-end lifestyle of The Dynasty, being taken to places with nudist beaches, “gorgeous women [or] luxurious beachside cabanas“ and having stable members debate whether it was “the more relevant title” in MLW opposite the National Openweight Championship. The group would also visit the Caribbean for less scrupulous reasons, such as purchasing Vega's childhood house at Puerto Rico to turn it into a bed and breakfast.

The storyline evolved to feature Holliday demanding that the Caribbean Heavyweight Championship was incorporated, or “naturalized”, as an official title within MLW and have him recognized as incumbent. In response, “MLW's CEO [Court Bauer] met with Puerto Rican government officials about hosting a Caribbean Heavyweight Championship title fight“ to be held in 2021 (tentatively at the Roberto Clemente Stadium in Carolina). During the final week of October 2020, the association between IWA-PR and MLW became a formal alliance. In the lead up to the announcement, Holliday complained twice about not being officially listed in the champions gallery, calling it “misrepresentation” and expressing his desire to “win over” and become “the face” of the region, ultimately threatening to melt the belt. Vega responded by issuing a challenge to a Caribbean Strap Match (a type of contest that he made famous by defeating Stone Cold Steve Austin at In Your House 8: Beware of Dog) for the belt in Puerto Rico.

Following another challenge, the self-proclaimed champion accepted to compete in the specialty match. On January 27, 2021, Holliday defeated Vega due to the intervention of referee Tim Donaghy, beginning his first official reign after 382 days of illegal possession. He then migrated to a feud with Gino Medina, a former member of The Dynasty, retaining the belt in April. Since Fall 2020, several talents formally associated with Lucha Underground were brought into MLW as part of the Azteca Underground stable, including César Durán (previously known as Dario Cueto), who became the on-screen owner of IWA-PR. King Muertes (formerly Mil Muertes in Lucha Underground, and known in Puerto Rico as Ricky Banderas) defeated Holliday to win the title in a match with “Caribbean Rules” at Battle Riot III.

At Fightland, he won his first defense by besting former MLW World Heavyweight Champion Tom Lawlor in a casket match. Muertes retained over Holliday in a rematch. On March 31, 2022, he defended the title in a four-way match against eventual winner Octagón Jr., El Dragón and El Hijo de L.A. Park. In his first defense, he retained over Matt Cross at Rise of the Renegades.

=== Return to IWA-PR (2022–present) ===
The Caribbean Heavyweight Championship became a storyline element again in IWA-PR in November 2022, when Khriz Díaz won an opportunity and criticized that a title that represented Puerto Rico was being contested between foreigners. Vignettes were shown where the challenger traveled to Mexico pursuing Octagón Jr., following provocations in Impacto Total and social media. Sneaking backstage at a AAA card, Díaz ambushed the champion in the lockers and took both the belt and his mask. After Octagón Jr. no-showed a scheduled defense at Histeria Boricua 2023, Savio Vega stripped him of the title and announced that the vacancy would be filled in the event. In a match of impromptu contenders, Díaz defeated Alejandro Marrero to win the revamped belt.

== Belt designs ==
The original design introduced in 2008 was based on the IWA Intercontinental Heavyweight Championship, which was designed and crafted by Reggie Parks in 1999, and in itself used the same basic template that this craftsman has used in the 1986 WWE Intercontinental Championship belt and other titles in his line. Like those belts, the Caribbean Heavyweight Championship had a main plate composed by three silver-colored rectangles of receding size. The central area of the design features a geographical map of the Caribbean inside a gilded circle, flanked by the same design of six five-pointed stars grouped together. Above and under are three red-colored ribbons, with the upper one prominently reading “CARIBBEAN” and the inferior pair “HEAVYWEIGHT WRESTLING CHAMPION”. The lower part features two eight-pointed stars, an element that is also present in the Parks belts. The crown of the belt has the company acronym, “IWA”, inside a red oval that is surrounded by leaf motifs. There are two side square silver-colored side plates that depict wrestlers grappling.

In April 2022, a new belt was commissioned as part of an initiative where IWA-PR revamped the design of all its titles. The new design was officially introduced on January 6, 2023, as part of Histeria Boricua.

== Reigns ==
IWA-PR currently recognizes 18 individual Caribbean Heavyweight Championship (Former name) / IWA Puerto Rico Championship reigns (Current name).

The inaugural champion was CQ the Ravishing. The longest reigning champion is Savio Vega, who held the title from June 15, 2019 to January 27, 2021 for a reign of 593 days; he is also the oldest titlist, earning the accolade at the age of 54 years and 309 days. So far, no wrestler has won the title more than once. Ash Rubynski is the shortest reigning champion with a reign that lasted a week. For a period of 162 days in 2011, the title was held concurrently along the Puerto Rico Heavyweight Championship.

In MLW, several fictional aspects were added to the background of the title. Despite using the belt and the acronym “IWA” being visible on camera, MLW confabulated it with the longevous WWC Caribbean Heavyweight Championship by claiming that it had “been won by the likes of Pedro Morales, Gilberto “Gypsy Joe” Meléndez, Abdullah the Butcher, [and] Gorilla Monsoon” (though of these, only the third actually held that title, with the others holding different accolades within the World Wrestling Council). The promotion claimed that “the San Juan Star, El Vocero and Claridad island newspapers have all chastised Holliday's actions”, this despite the first being defunct, the second no longer covering professional wrestling and the third never having done so. The claim that it was sanctioned by the “Sports Ministry of Puerto Rico” is equally fictional, since no such executive department exists and the Puerto Rico Department of Sports and Recreation only oversees promotions as a form of entertainment business.

== List of champions ==
Key
No.	Overall reign number
Reign	Reign number for the specific champion
Days	Number of days held
+	Current reign is changing daily

No.	Champion	Championship change			Reign statistics		Notes	Ref.
No.	Champion	Date	Event	Location	Reign	Days	Notes	Ref.
International Wrestling Association (Puerto Rico)
1	GQ The Ravishing	February 14, 2009	Noche de Campeones (2009)	Bayamón, Puerto Rico	1	91	Won a 15 Man Tornado Rumble Match by last Eliminating Cruzz to become the inaugural champion.	
2	Golden Boy	May 16, 2009	Juicio Final (2009)	Bayamón, Puerto Rico	1	29		
3	Noel Rodríguez	June 14, 2009	IWA Puerto Rico	Gurabo, Puerto Rico	1	216		
4	El Diabólico	January 16, 2010	IWA Puerto Rico	Aguas Buenas, Puerto Rico	1	119		
5	Ash Rubynski	May 15, 2010	Impacto Total	Bayamón, Puerto Rico	1	7	GM Joe Bravo awarded the title to Ash after Diabolico was unable to defend the title in 30 days.	
6	Rico Casanova	May 22, 2010	IWA Puerto Rico	Toa Alta, Puerto Rico	1	137		
—	Vacated	October 6, 2010	—	—	—	—	Stripped by IWA president Miguel Pérez, Jr. for failure to defend in several months.	
7	Xix Xavant	October 16, 2010	Hardcore Weekend (2010)	Bayamón, Puerto Rico	1	133	Defeated Romeo for the vacant title in a Caribbean Strap Match.	
—	Unified	February 26, 2011	—	Yabucoa, Puerto Rico	—	—	Xavant defeated Damian to Unify the title with Puerto Rico Heavyweight Championship.	
8	Cyrus	March 7, 2012	IWA/EWO Clash of the Titans	Santurce, Puerto Rico	1	101	Won a 8 Man "Lucha X Match" to win the Vacant Title	
—	Deactivated	June 16, 2012	—	—	—	—	Title deactivated when IWA-PR entered a seven-year hiatus.	
Major League Wrestling (MLW)
9	Savio Vega	June 15, 2019	MLW Fusion	New York City, New York	1	592	Reactivated at Major League Wrestling.	
10	Richard Holliday	January 27, 2021	MLW Fusion	Orlando, Florida	1	164		
11	King Muertes	July 10, 2021	Battle Riot III	Philadelphia, Pennsylvania	1	264		
12	Octagón Jr.	March 31, 2022	Intimidation Games	Dallas, Texas	1	281	He defeated King Muertes, El Dragon and El Hijo de L.A. Park in a Four-way match. This was a tape delay that aired on May 12, 2022.	
International Wrestling Association (Puerto Rico)
—	Vacated	January 6, 2023	—	—	—	—	Octagón Jr. was stripped by Savio Vega for failure to defend.	
13	Khris Díaz	January 6, 2023	IWA Histeria Boricua (2023)	Juncos, Puerto Rico	1	99	Defeated El Niche in a match to fill the vacancy.	
14	Miguel Pérez Jr.	April 15, 2023	IWA Juicio Final (2023)	Humacao, Puerto Rico	1	63		
15	Harry Williams	June 17, 2023	IWA Summer Attitude (2023)	Humacao, Puerto Rico	1	105		
—	Vacated	September 30, 2023	—	—	—	—	On the same day, before Golpe de Estado 2023 event even started, "Reckless" Harry Williams vacated the title due to injury. And a New Champion would be crown in that same night.	
16	Pupe Jackson	September 30, 2023	IWA Golpe de Estado (2023)	Humacao, Puerto Rico	1	14	Won the vacant title after defeating Azazel and Edrax in a Three Way Match.	
17	Romeo	October 14, 2023	IWA Halloween Mayhem (2023)	Juncos, Puerto Rico	1	63		
18	Manny Ferno	December 16, 2023	IWA Christmas in PR (2023)	Juncos, Puerto Rico	1	259		
19	Pedro Portillo III	August 31, 2024	Conflicto Letal: The World Wrestling Envasion (2024)	Juncos, Puerto Rico	1	28	This was a winner takes all unification match, were both Ferno's Puerto Rico title and Portillo's World Title were both on the line.	
20	John Hawking	September 28, 2024	Golpe de Estado	Bayamón, Puerto Rico	1	737	John Hawking defeat Pedro Portillo III in a triple title match for the IWA World Heavyweight Championship, IWA Intercontinental Heavyweight Championship and the IWA Puerto Rico Championship.	

== Combined reigns ==
As of 2 June 2025

†	Indicates the current champion

Rank	Wrestler	No. of reigns	Combined days
1	Savio Vega	1	592
2	Octagón Jr.	1	281
3	King Muertes	1	264
4	Manny Ferno	1	259
5	John Hawking †	1	737+
6	Noel Rodríguez	1	216
7	Richard Holliday	1	164
8	Rico Casanova	1	137
9	Xix Xavant	1	133
10	El Diabólico	1	119
11	Harry Williams	1	105
12	Cyrus	1	101
13	Khris Díaz	1	99
14	Ravishing Richard	1	91
15	Miguel Pérez Jr.	1	63
15	Romeo	1	63
16	Golden Boy	1	29
17	Pedro Portillo III	1	28
18	Pupe Jackson	1	14
19	Ash Rubynski	1	7
