= SuperFight (2019) =

2019 Major League Wrestling professional wrestling event

- Promotion: Major League Wrestling
- Date: February 2, 2019
- City: Philadelphia, Pennsylvania
- Venue: 2300 Arena

Event chronology
← Previous; Zero Hour	Next → Intimidation Games

SuperFight chronology
← Previous; First	Next → Saturday Night SuperFight

MLW Fusion special episodes chronology
← Previous; Christmas Special	Next → Intimidation Games

SuperFight (2019) was a professional wrestling event produced by Major League Wrestling (MLW). It took place on February 2, 2019, at the 2300 Arena in Philadelphia, Pennsylvania. The event aired live on television as a two-hour special episode of Fusion on beIN Sports, and it was the first event under the SuperFight chronology.

Fourteen matches were contested at the event, with nine matches being taped for future episodes of Fusion while three matches were broadcast live on SuperFight. The live broadcast notably featured two title changes as Tom Lawlor cashed in his Battle Riot opportunity to defeat Low Ki to win the World Heavyweight Championship and The Hart Foundation (Davey Boy Smith Jr. and Teddy Hart) defeated The Lucha Brothers (Pentagon Jr. and Rey Fenix) to win the World Tag Team Championship.

== Production ==
=== Background ===
In July 2017, Major League Wrestling resumed promoting events for the first time since the promotion's original closure in 2004. The success of these events lead MLW to secure a television deal with beIN Sports for a new program, MLW Fusion, which debuted on April 20, 2018.

On October 8, MLW announced that it would be holding an event titled SuperFight on February 2. On November 9, MLW announced that the event would be held at the famous. 2300 Arena in Philadelphia, Pennsylvania.

=== Storylines ===
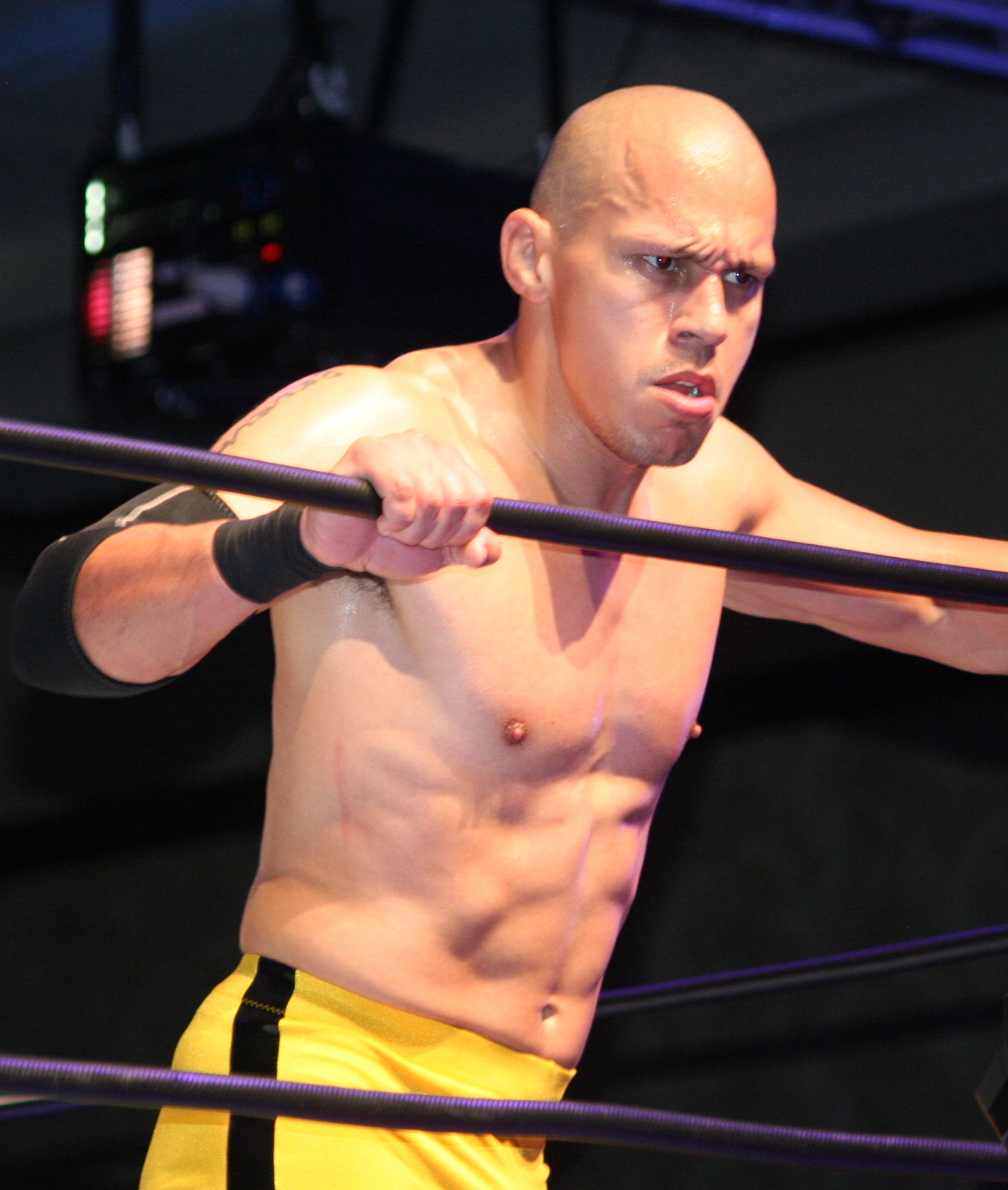
Low Ki was the defending World Heavyweight Champion heading into SuperFight.

The card consisted of matches that resulted from scripted storylines, where wrestlers portrayed villains, heroes, or less distinguishable characters in scripted events that built tension and culminated in a wrestling match or series of matches, with results predetermined by MLW's writers. Storylines were played out on MLW's television program Fusion.

Tom Lawlor won the first-ever Battle Riot match at the namesake event on July 19, 2018, thus earning the right to challenge for the MLW World Heavyweight Championship at any place and any time of his choosing within six months. On the October 19 episode of Fusion, Lawlor defeated former champion Shane Strickland to cement his status as MLW's franchise player and then announced that he would challenge Low Ki for the title at SuperFight. This led to the beginning of a feud between Lawlor and Ki's group Promociones Dorado as Lawlor would be attacked by Sami Callihan on the October 26 episode of Fusion, whom Lawlor defeated in a Street Fight on the November 16 episode of Fusion and then Lawlor's teammate Simon Gotch turned on him by setting him up to get attacked by Promociones Dorado. On the December 28 episode of Fusion, Low Ki defended the title against Konnan in a no disqualification match which ended in a no contest after Promociones Dorado members attacked Konnan until Lawlor made the save. On the January 11, 2019 episode of Fusion, Low Ki defeated Lawlor's Team Filthy member Fred Yehi while Salina de la Renta tried to set up Lawlor for an attack by Sami Callihan but Lawlor foiled the plan and attacked Callihan with the hammer. This set up Ki and Lawlor's title match for SuperFight.

On November 20, MLW announced that The Lucha Brothers (Pentagon Jr. and Rey Fenix) would defend the World Tag Team Championship against The Hart Foundation (Teddy Hart and Davey Boy Smith Jr.) at Never Say Never on the basis of Hart Foundation's dominant streak in the tag team division. However, Fenix suffered a groin injury and the title match was postponed for a later date. On December 27, MLW announced that Lucha Brothers would be competing at SuperFight. On January 3, it was announced that the originally scheduled World Tag Team Championship match between Lucha Brothers and Hart Foundation would be taking place at SuperFight.

On December 21, it was reported by MLW that Kotto Brazil had been attacked by an unknown assailant at a nightclub in Miami and was consequently hospitalized. Promociones Dorado member Ricky Martinez was later revealed to be the assailant and the MLW management suspended him on the December 28 episode of Fusion. Shortly after Brazil recovered from his injury, a match was made between Brazil and Martinez at SuperFight.

== Event ==
=== Preliminary matches ===
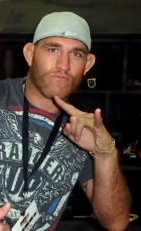
Tom Lawlor defeated Low Ki in the main event of the SuperFight to win the MLW World Heavyweight Championship.

The first match that opened the live broadcast featured The Lucha Brothers (Pentagon Jr. and Rey Fenix) defending the World Tag Team Championship against The Hart Foundation (Davey Boy Smith Jr. and Teddy Hart). Smith ripped off Pentagon's mask, allowing Smith and Hart to nail a Canadian Destroyer to Fenix to win the titles.

Next, Kotto Brazil made his return to MLW against Ricky Martinez. Brazil had applied a submission hold on Martinez making him tap out but Martinez' valet Salina de la Renta distracted the referee, which led to Brazil grabbing her and Salina sprayed Brazil's eye with a Pepper Spray, allowing Martinez to roll him up for the win.

=== Main event match ===
In the main event, Low Ki defended the World Heavyweight Championship against Tom Lawlor. Ki nailed a Warrior's Way on Lawlor but got a near-fall. Ki tried to apply a Dragon Clutch on Lawlor but Lawlor countered it into a rear naked choke to make Ki pass out and win the title.

== Reception ==
SuperFight received mixed reviews from critics. Jordon Lawrenz of PW Ponderings rated the event 4 out of 10, appreciating the World Tag Team Championship match considering it to be "pretty good, but even that could’ve been better, and was easily the best thing on the show." He panned the singles match between Ricky Martinez and Kotto Brazil as well as the quick ending to the World Heavyweight Championship match, citing that the match was "SEVEN MONTHS in the making and all they get is basically a seven-minute squash match".

Arnold Furious of WrestleTalk considered it to be a "Very, very disappointing show".

Cageside Seats staff appreciated the show, considering it to be "dynamite". According to the staff, "All three matches lived up to their marquee billing" and "Both title matches had a big fight feel." They considered the World Tag Team Championship match to be "mighty fine in terms of excitement" and "The finish was curious from a booking and rumor perspective." According to them, the World Heavyweight Championship match was "thrilling" and "complimented the story that had been told to that point" but "the finish was abrupt."

== Aftermath ==
Tom Lawlor and Low Ki continued their rivalry after SuperFight as Lawlor would defend the World Heavyweight Championship against Low Ki in a steel cage rematch at Intimidation Games.

On the February 16 episode of Fusion, Teddy Hart defended the World Middleweight Championship against Maxwell Jacob Friedman, who had been stripped off the title in 2018 due to an injury. Hart retained the title but MJF and Richard Holliday assaulted Hart in the backstage area during a post-match interview. MJF and Holliday formed an alliance called The Dynasty and began feuding with the Hart Foundation, which led to a match between the two teams for the World Tag Team Championship at Intimidation Games.

== Results ==
No.	Results	Stipulations
1^{FT}	Rich Swann defeated Lance Anoa'i	Singles match
2^{FT}	Alexander Hammerstone defeated Ariel Dominguez	Singles match
3	The Hart Foundation (Davey Boy Smith Jr. and Teddy Hart) (with Brian Pillman Jr.) defeated The Lucha Brothers (Pentagon Jr. and Rey Fenix) (c)	Tag team match for the MLW World Tag Team Championship
4	Ricky Martinez (with Salina de la Renta) defeated Kotto Brazil	Singles match
5	Tom Lawlor defeated Low Ki (c) (with Salina de la Renta) via submission	Singles match for the MLW World Heavyweight Championship
6^{FT}	Mance Warner defeated Jimmy Yuta	Singles match
7^{D}	Almighty Sheik and Jacob Fatu defeated Chico Adams and Kwame Nas	Tag team match
8^{FT}	Myron Reed defeated DJZ	Singles match
9^{D}	Ace Romero defeated Simon Gotch via disqualification	Singles match
10^{FT}	Ace Austin defeated Rich Swann	Singles match
11^{FT}	The Hart Foundation (Brian Pillman Jr. and Davey Boy Smith Jr.) defeated The Sandman and Tommy Dreamer	Tag team match
12^{FT}	Gringo Loco defeated Puma King	Singles match
13^{FT}	Rey Horus defeated Aero Star	Singles match
14^{FT}	Teddy Hart (c) defeated Maxwell Jacob Friedman	Singles match for the MLW World Middleweight Championship
(c) / – the champion(s) heading into the match; FT / – the match was taped for a future broadcast of Fusion; D / – this was a dark match
