= MLW Saturday Night SuperFight =

2019 Major League Wrestling pay-per-view event

Saturday Night SuperFight
- Promotional poster
- Promotion: Major League Wrestling
- Date: November 2, 2019
- City: Cicero, Illinois
- Venue: Cicero Stadium

Pay-per-view chronology
← Previous; First	Next → Saturday Night SuperFight (2026)

Event chronology
← Previous; The Crash/Major League Wrestling show	Next → Blood and Thunder

SuperFight chronology
← Previous; February 2019	Next → 2022

Saturday Night SuperFight was a professional wrestling pay-per-view (PPV) event produced by the Major League Wrestling (MLW) promotion, which took place at the Cicero Stadium in Cicero, Illinois on November 2, 2019. It was MLW's first pay-per-view event and the second event under the Superfight chronology. The event aired live on traditional PPV outlets and FITE TV. It would be the last MLW event to be broadcast live until Never Say Never in 2023, and their last event to take place at Cicero Stadium until Azteca Lucha in 2024.

Twelve matches were contested at the event including four on the pre-show. The main event was a no disqualification match, in which Jacob Fatu defeated LA Park to retain the World Heavyweight Championship. In other prominent matches on the card, Alexander Hammerstone defeated Davey Boy Smith, Jr. to retain the National Openweight Championship, Teddy Hart defeated Austin Aries to retain the World Middleweight Championship, The Von Erichs (Ross and Marshall) defeated The Dynasty (Maxwell J. Friedman and Richard Holliday) in a Texas Tornado match to win the World Tag Team Championship and Mance Warner defeated Jimmy Havoc and Bestia 666 in a Stairway to Hell match.

== Production ==
=== Background ===
In July 2017, Major League Wrestling resumed promoting events for the first time since the promotion's original closure in 2004. The success of these events lead MLW to secure a television deal with beIN Sports for a new program, MLW Fusion, which debuted on April 20, 2018. In November, MLW broke their attendance record with their Fightland event in Chicago at Cicero Stadium. Eventually, MLW began airing live specials on beIN Sports, in which the promotion was broadcast live during Fusion television tapings. MLW's first live special of 2019 was SuperFight, which was held in Philadelphia, Pennsylvania at the 2300 Arena.

On July 5, 2019, MLW announced their first pay-per-view event titled Saturday Night SuperFight, which would be held on November 2, 2019 at the Cicero Stadium in Cicero, Illinois. On August 8, MLW announced that they had reached a deal with FITE TV to produce content for their streaming network, with Saturday Night SuperFight being the first MLW event produced for the platform. Before the event aired on pay-per-view, a live pre-show aired as a special episode of MLW Fusion.

=== Storylines ===
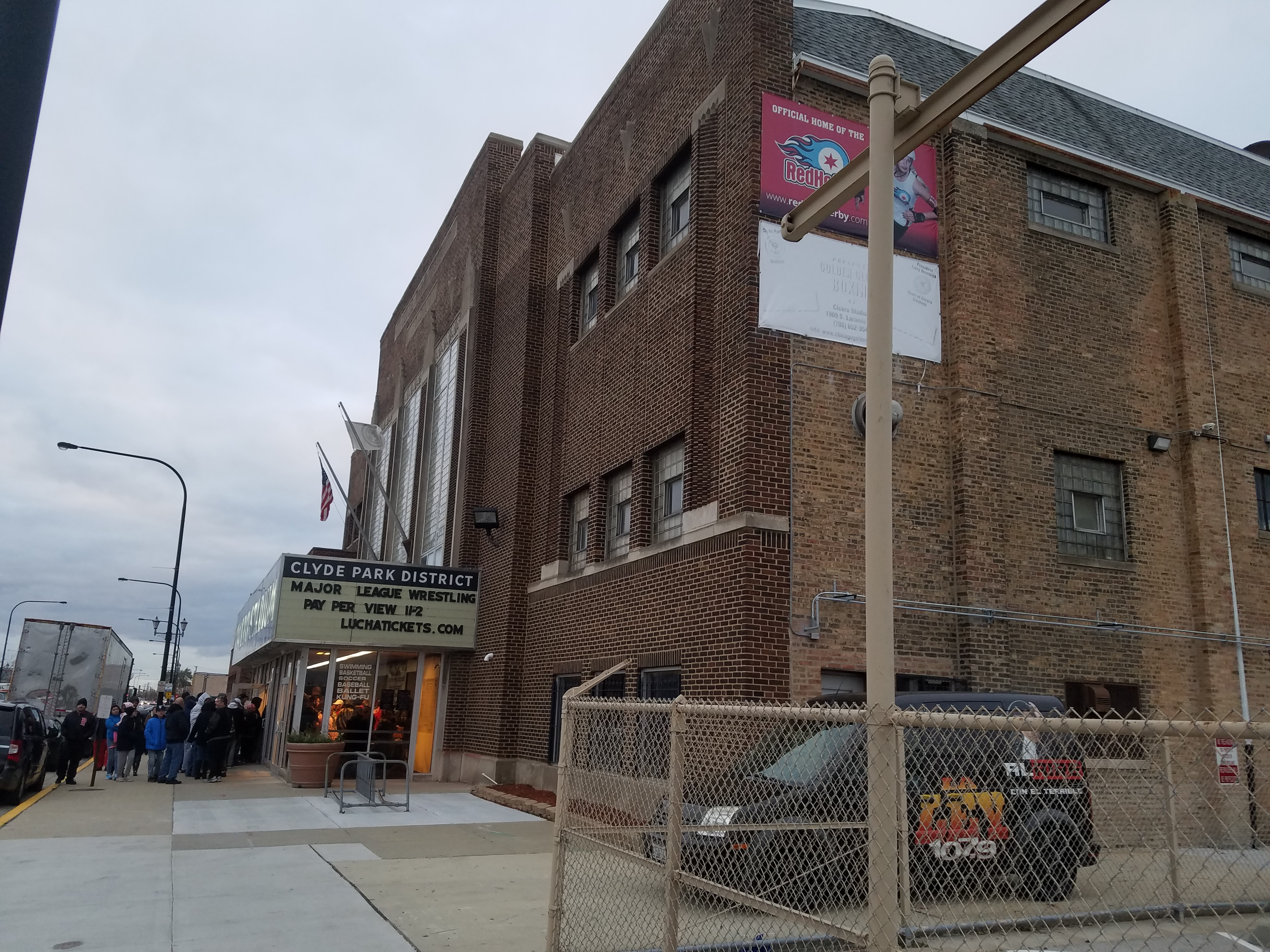
Cicero Stadium on the evening of the event

The event featured professional wrestling matches that involved different wrestlers from pre-existing scripted feuds and storylines. Wrestlers portrayed villains, heroes, or less distinguishable characters in scripted events that built tension and culminated in a wrestling match or series of matches.

On April 5, 2019, LA Park won the Battle Riot, earning a "Golden Ticket" for a MLW World Heavyweight Championship match at any time of his choosing. On September 7, it was announced that LA Park would cash in his "Golden Ticket" and face MLW Champion Jacob Fatu at Saturday Night SuperFight.

== Event ==
=== Pre-show ===
In the opening match, Savio Vega took on Leo Brien. Vega avoided a middle rope elbow drop from Brien and attacked him and shoved the referee down, allowing Brien to hit Vega with a cowbell and a diving elbow drop for the win. However, Vega attacked Brien with a kendo stick after the match.

Next, Air Wolf took on the debuting Gino Medina. After avoiding a Pele kick by Wolf, Medina hit a knee strike and an Eat Da-Feet for the win.

Next, El Hijo de L.A. Park took on Zenshi. After avoiding a 450° splash by Zenshi, Park nailed a package piledriver to Zenshi for the win.

The final match on the pre-show was a three-way tag team match pitting Contra Unit (Simon Gotch and Ikuro Kwon) against Dominic Garrini and Douglas James and The Spirit Squad (Mike Mondo and Kenn Doane). Garrini applied an armbar on Doane but Doane caught the ropes, allowing Kwon to spit mist into Mondo's face and Gotch nailed a cradle piledriver to Mondo for the win.

=== Preliminary matches ===
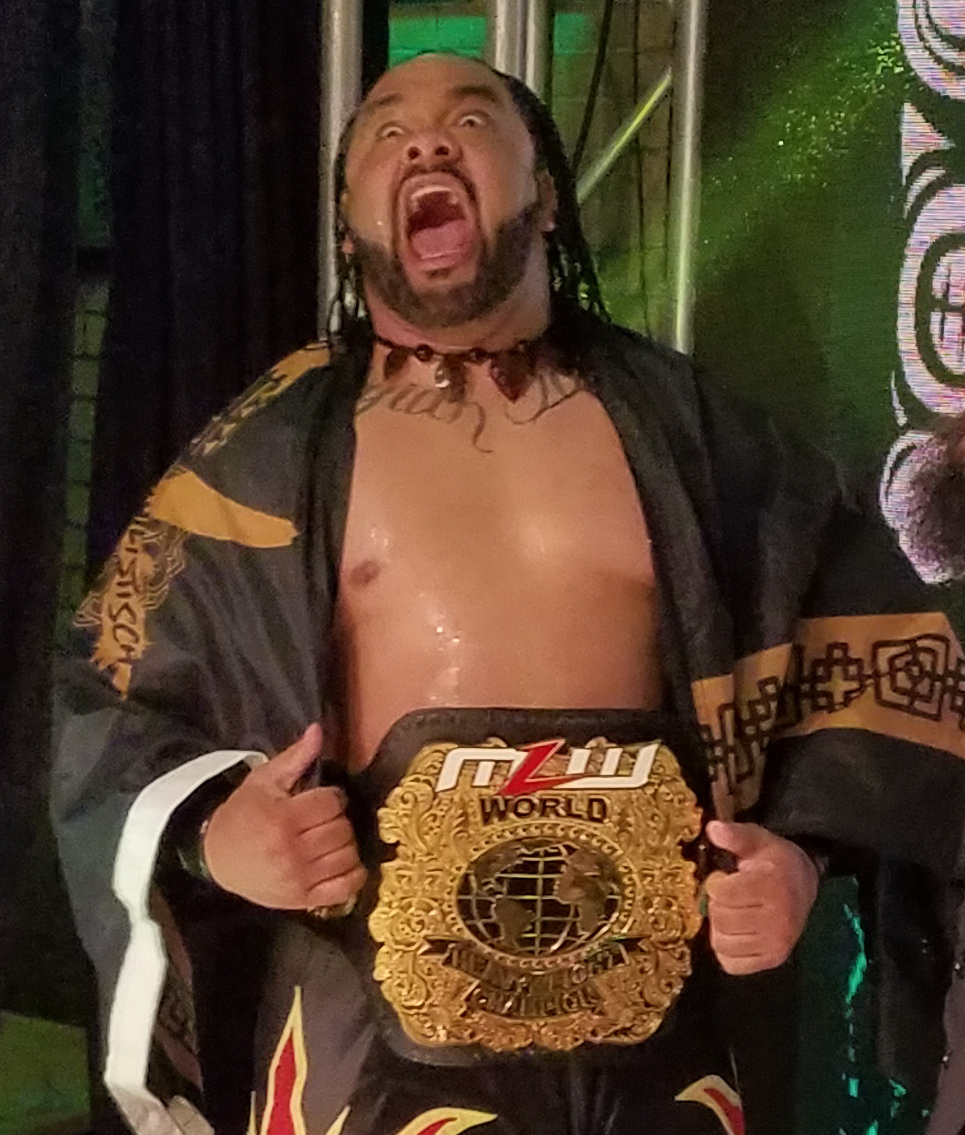
Jacob Fatu defended the MLW World Heavyweight Championship against L.A. Park in the main event.

The event kicked off with a Texas Tornado match, in which The Dynasty (Maxwell J. Friedman and Richard Holliday) defended the World Tag Team Championship against The Von Erichs (Marshall Von Erich and Ross Von Erich). After dumping Holliday out of the ring, the Von Erichs hit a claw slam to MJF to win the titles.

Next, Gringo Loco, Puma King, and Septimo Dragon took on Injustice (Jordan Oliver, Kotto Brazil, and Myron Reed) in a six-man tag team match. Reed delivered a springboard 450° splash to Dragon for the win.

Next, Teddy Hart defended the World Middleweight Championship against Austin Aries. After kicking out of a roll-up by Aries, Hart executed a Hart Destroyer to Aries to retain the title.

Next, Low Ki took on Brian Pillman Jr. Pillman threw his mouthguard at Ki and Ki nailed a running somersault kick to Pillman for the win.

Next, Tom Lawlor took on Timothy Thatcher. Lawlor made Thatcher submit to the rear naked choke for the win.

Later, Bestia 666 took on Jimmy Havoc and Mance Warner in a Stairway to Hell match. Warner drove Bestia through a table with a superplex to win the match. Havoc attacked Warner from behind after the match and nailed a piledriver to Warner on the steel guard rail and delivered an Acid Rainmaker to Warner.

This was followed by the penultimate match, in which Alexander Hammerstone defended the National Openweight Championship against Davey Boy Smith Jr. Smith countered a Nightmare Pendulum by Hammerstone into a cradle and a series of cradles between the two culminated with Hammerstone pinning Smith with a schoolboy while grabbing the ropes for leverage to retain the title.

=== Main event match ===
The main event was a No Disqualification match, in which Jacob Fatu defended the World Heavyweight Championship against L.A. Park. Park avoided a moonsault by Fatu and covered him for the pinfall but Fatu's Contra Unit teammate Josef Samael interfered by throwing a fireball into the referee's eyes and Park tried to hit a spear to Samael but Samael ducked and Salina de la Renta was hit with it being sent through a table. The distraction allowed Fatu to hit a superkick, a pop-up Samoan drop and a moonsault to Park to retain the title.

== Results ==
No.	Results	Stipulations
1^{F}	Leo Brien defeated Savio Vega	Singles match
2^{F}	Gino Medina defeated Air Wolf	Singles match
3^{F}	El Hijo de L.A. Park defeated Zenshi	Singles match
4^{F}	Contra Unit (Simon Gotch and Ikuro Kwon) defeated Dominic Garrini and Douglas James and The Spirit Squad (Mike Mondo and Kenn Doane)	Three-way match
5	The Von Erichs (Marshall and Ross Von Erich) defeated The Dynasty (Maxwell J. Friedman and Richard Holliday) (c)	Texas Tornado match for the MLW World Tag Team Championship
6	Injustice (Jordan Oliver, Kotto Brazil, and Myron Reed) defeated Gringo Loco, Puma King, and Septimo Dragon	Six-man tag team match
7	Teddy Hart (c) defeated Austin Aries	Singles match for the MLW World Middleweight Championship
8	Low Ki defeated Brian Pillman Jr	Singles match
9	Tom Lawlor defeated Timothy Thatcher via submission	Singles match
10	Mance Warner defeated Jimmy Havoc and Bestia 666	Stairway to Hell match
11	Alexander Hammerstone (c) defeated Davey Boy Smith Jr.	Singles match for the MLW National Openweight Championship
12	Jacob Fatu (c) (with Josef Samael) defeated L.A. Park (with Salina de la Renta)	No Disqualification match for the MLW World Heavyweight Championship; This is LA Park's Golden Ticket cash-in match
(c) / – the champion(s) heading into the match; F / – the match was broadcast prior to the pay-per-view on Fusion

== Gallery ==
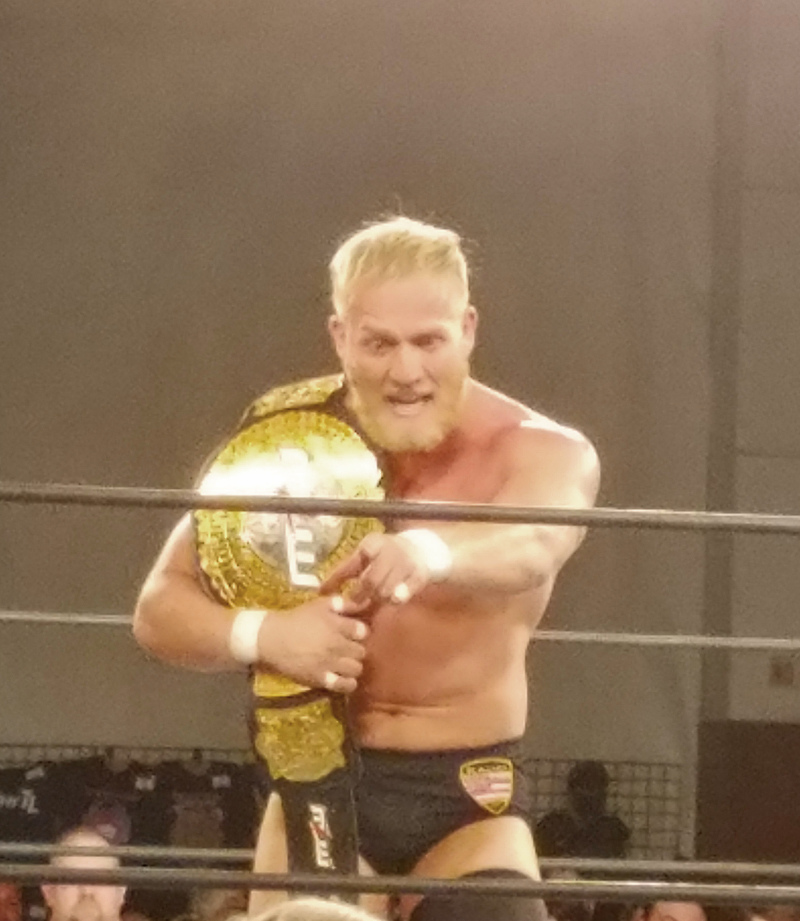
Marshall Von Erich celebrating after winning the MLW World Tag Team Championship

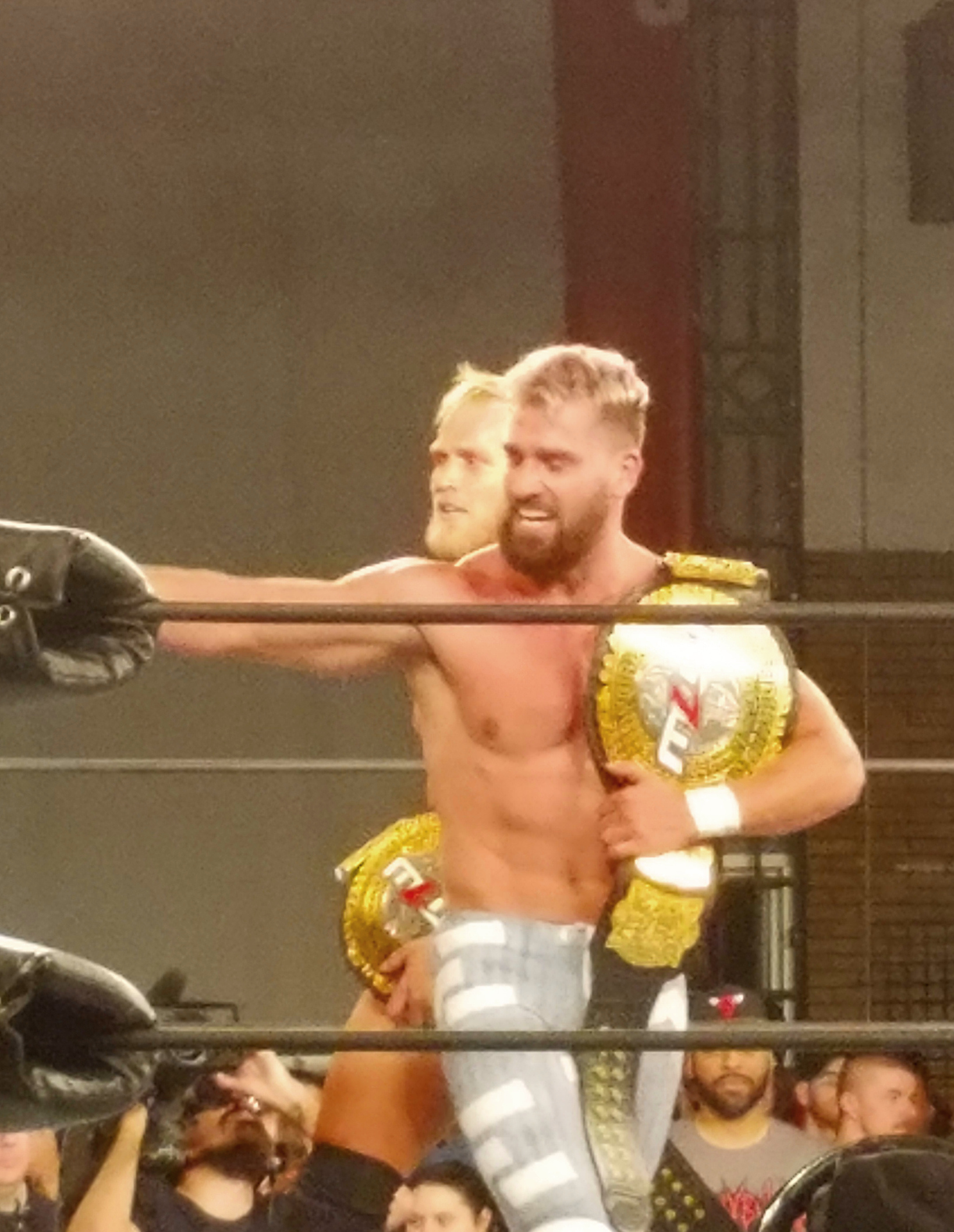
Ross Von Erich celebrating after winning the MLW World Tag Team Championship

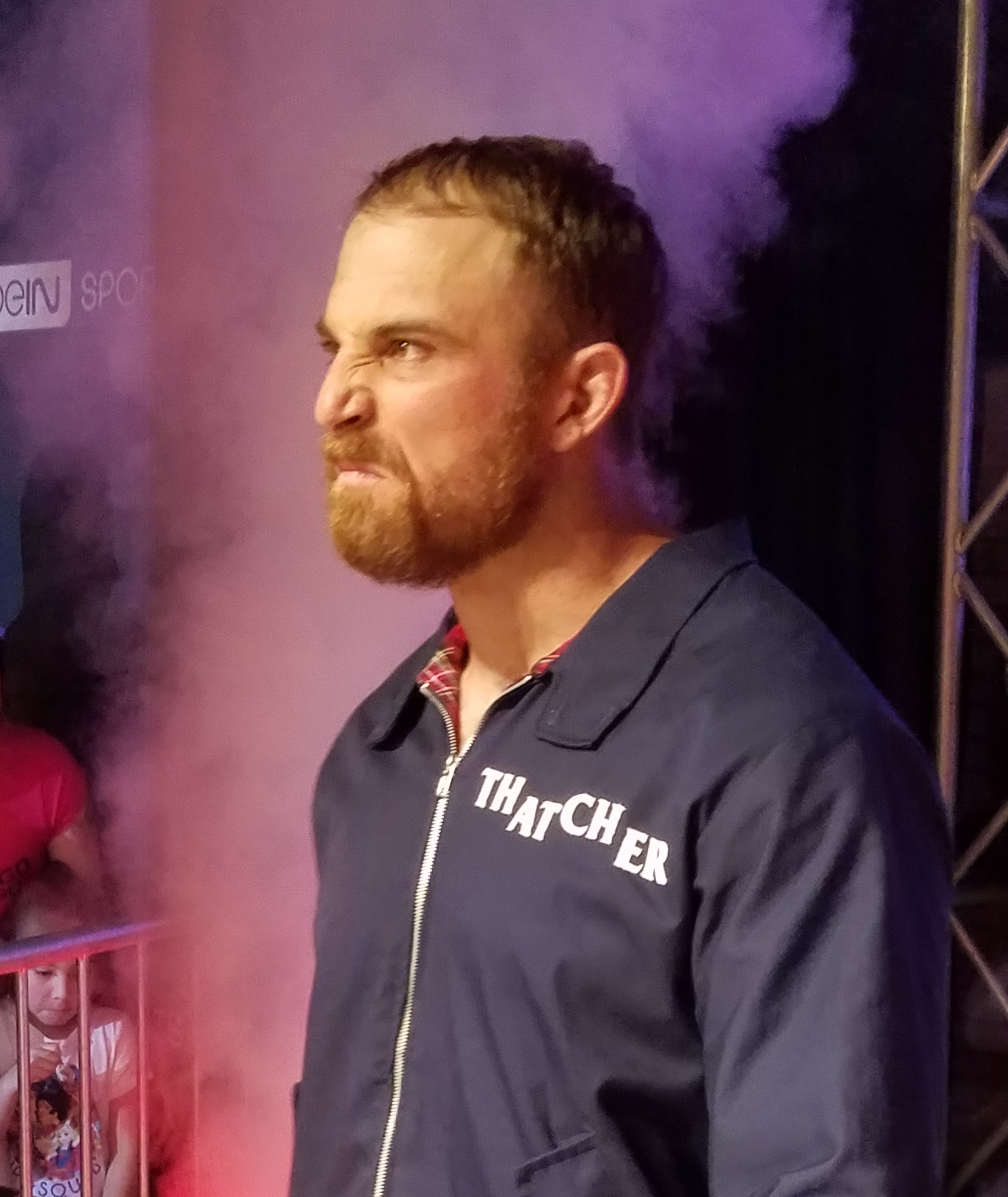
Timothy Thatcher making his entrance to the ring

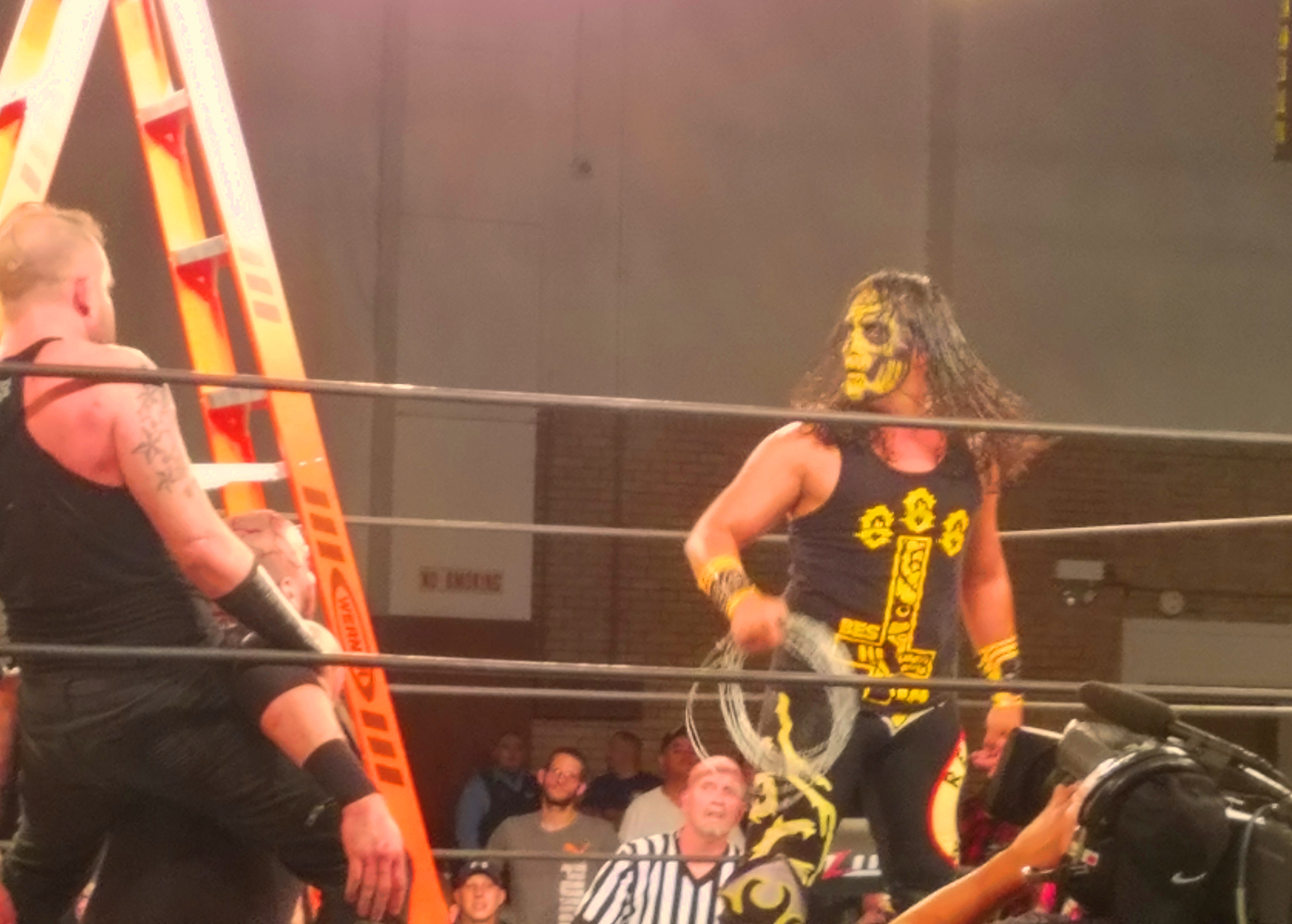
The three-way Stairway to Hell match between Bestia 666, Jimmy Havoc and Mance Warner

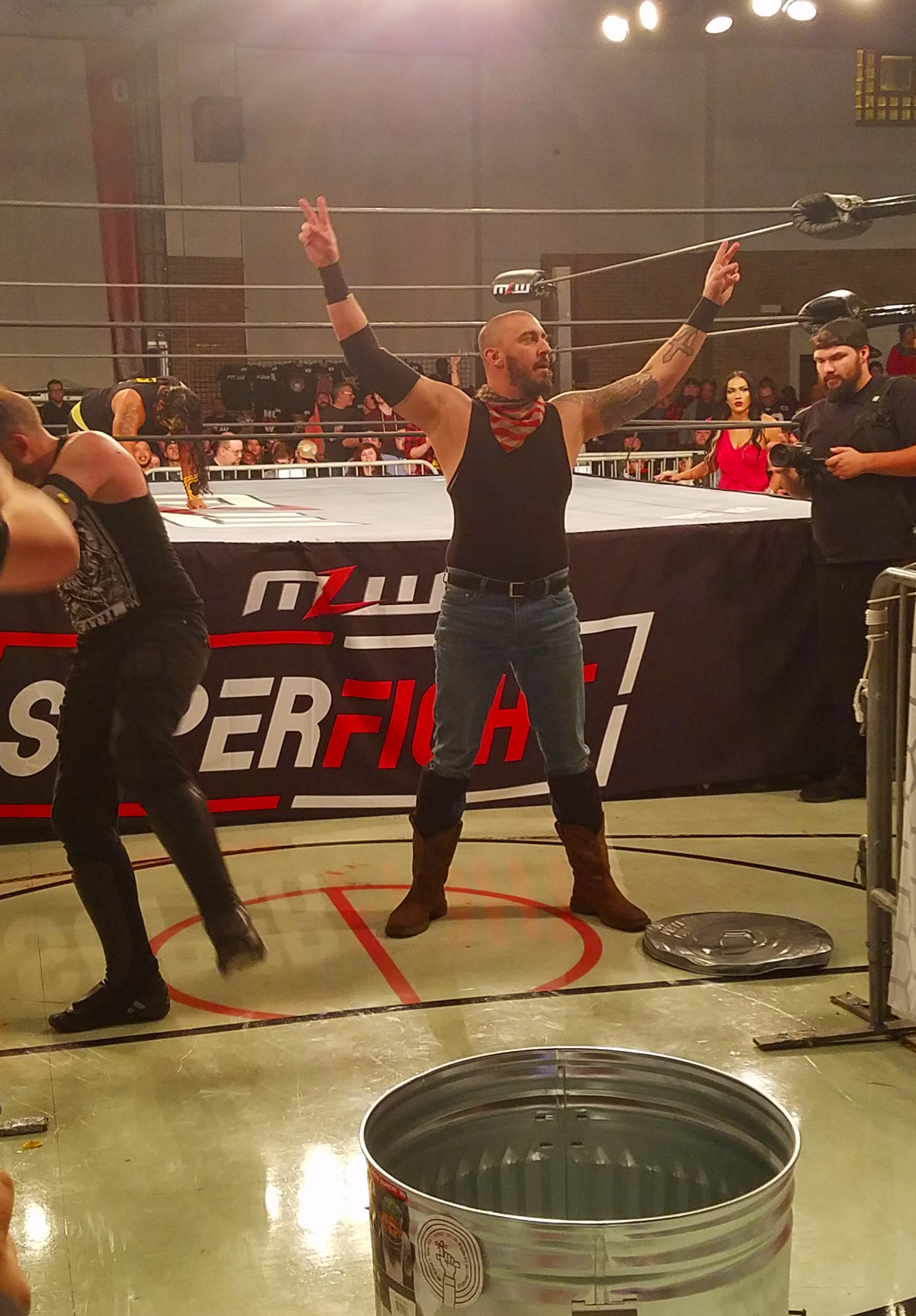
Mance Warner celebrating his victory

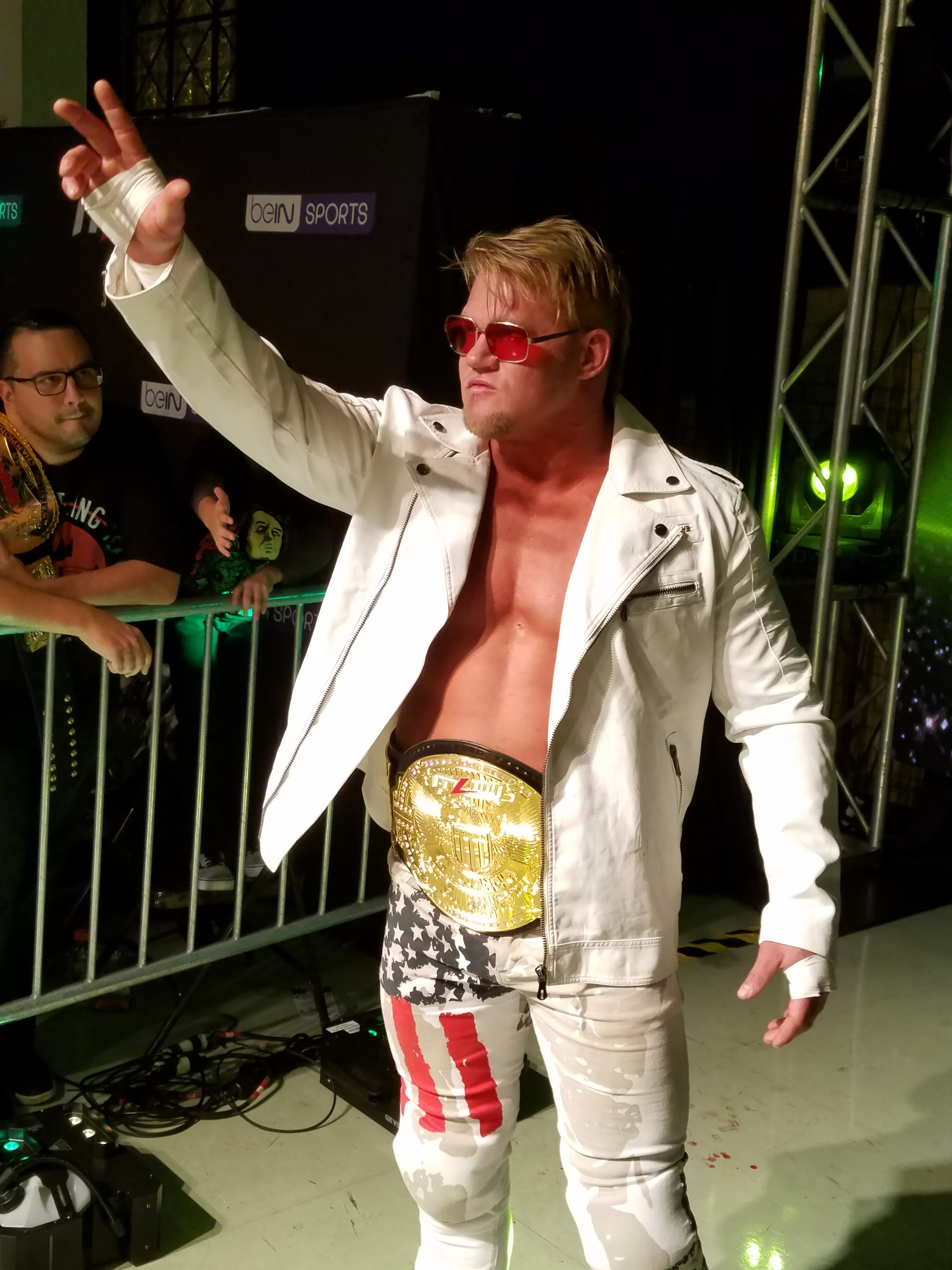
Alexander Hammerstone making his entrance to the ring to defend the MLW National Openweight Championship

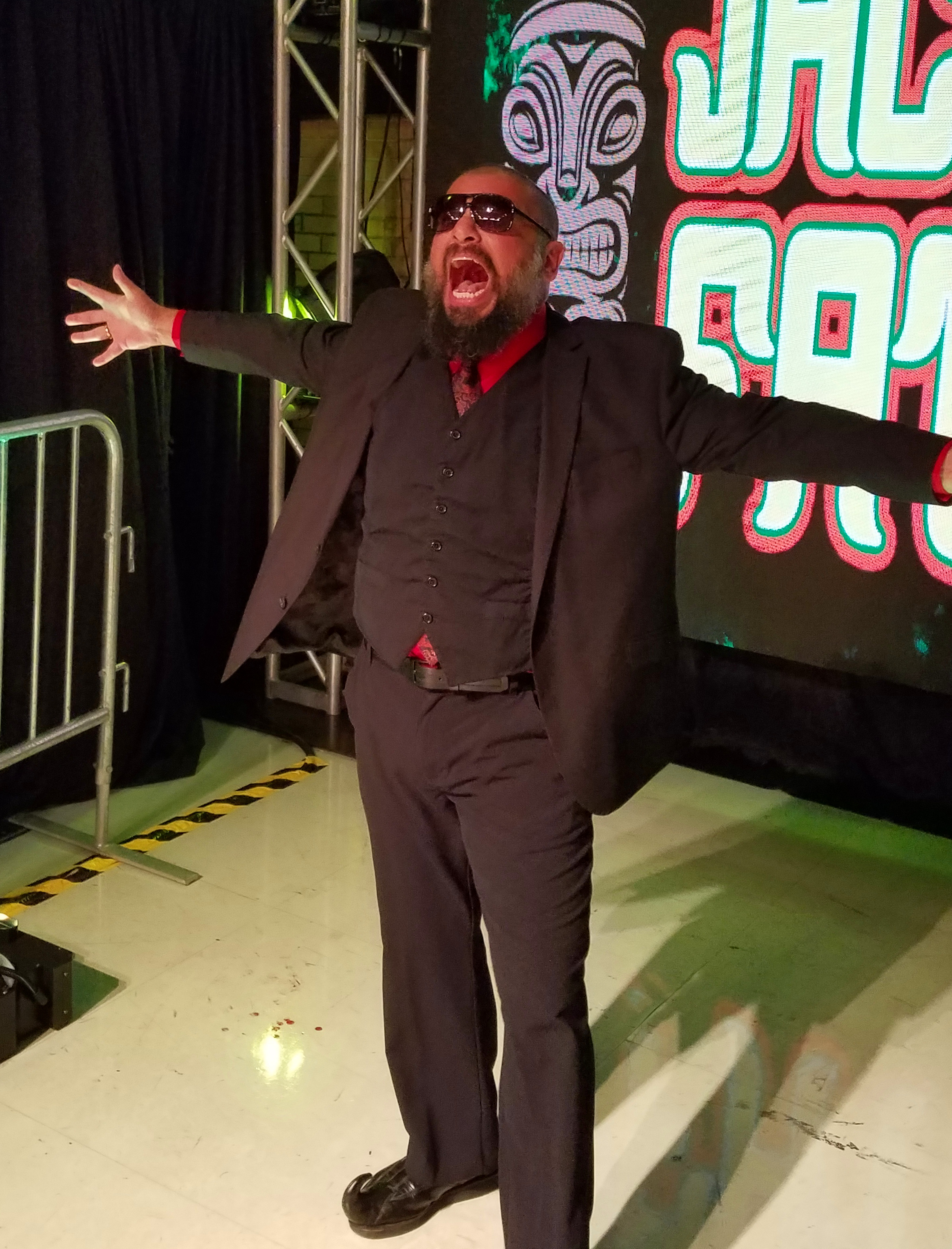
Josef Samael accompanying Jacob Fatu to the ring during his entrance

== See also ==
- 2019 in professional wrestling
