= Alex Kane =

American professional wrestler (born 1993)

Personal information
- Born: October 21, 1993 (age 33) Villa Rica, Georgia, U.S.

Professional wrestling career
- Ring name: Alex Kane
- Billed height: 5 ft 10 in (1.78 m)
- Billed weight: 238 lb (108 kg)
- Billed from: Atlanta, Georgia
- Trained by: AR Fox
- Debut: 2018

Alex Kane (born October 21, 1993) is an American professional wrestler, who currently works on the independent circuit. He is best known for his time in Major League Wrestling (MLW), where is a former one-time MLW World Heavyweight Champion and former one-time MLW National Openweight Champion.

== Professional wrestling career ==
=== Major League Wrestling (2021–2025) ===
On May 27, 2021, it was announced that Kane signed with MLW. He debuted at Battle Riot III, defeating Budd Heavy in the opening match and also entered in the eponymous Battle Riot match. At War Chamber, Kane won the vacant MLW National Openweight Championship in a five way ladder match. He successfully defended title against Aero Star on January 13 and January 21, 2022, respectively at AZTECA and Fusion. On February 26, Special edition of Fusion: Super Fight he retained title in a three-way match against Calvin Tankman and ACH. On June the 23, 2022 Alex Kane lost the MLW National Openweight title to Davey Richards at Battle Riot IV.

On July 8, 2023 at Never Say Never, Kane defeated Alexander Hammerstone for the MLW World Heavyweight Championship. On September 3 at Fury Road, Kane retained the MLW World Heavyweight Championship against Willie Mack. On October 14 at Slaughterhouse, Kane defeated Tom Lawlor retaining the MLW Heavyweight Championship. On November 18 at Fightland, Kane retained his title against Jacob Fatu. On December 7 at One Shot, Kane defeated Matt Cardona retaining the MLW World Heavyweight Championship. After the match, Kane was attacked by a returning Richard Holliday, who aligned himself with World Titan Federation.

On January 6, 2024 at Kings of Colosseum, Kane defeated Holliday retaining the MLW World Heavyweight Championship. On February 3 at SuperFight, Kane lost the MLW World Heavyweight Championship to Satoshi Kojima. On February 29 at Intimidation Games, Kane defeated Bobby Fish via referee stoppage after Fish passed out to a rear-naked choke.

== Personal life ==
Kane became the first openly Bisexual professional wrestling world champion in a major promotion after winning the MLW World Heavyweight Championship on July 8, 2023.

== Championships and accomplishments ==
- Major League Wrestling
  - MLW World Heavyweight Championship (1 time)
  - MLW National Openweight Championship (1 time)
  - Battle Riot (2023)
- ACTION Wrestling
  - ACTION Championship (1 time)
- Paradigm Pro Wrestling
  - PPW Heavy Hitters Championship (1 time)
  - Fighting Spirit Heavyweight Grand Prix (2022)
- Pro Wrestling Illustrated
  - Ranked No. 25 of the top 500 singles wrestlers in the PWI 500 in 2024
- World Wrestling Alliance 4
  - WWA4 Internet Championship (1 time)
- Wrestling United
  - Wrestling United Championship (1 time)
- Dynamic Wrestling Association
  - King Of The South Champion (1 time)
- Renegade Pro Wrestling
  - RIPW Heavy Weight Champion (Current)
