= Salina de la Renta =

Puerto Rican professional wrestler

Personal information
- Born: Natalia Class; February 6, 1997 (age 29) Carolina, Puerto Rico
- Children: 1

Professional wrestling career
- Ring name(s): Mila Naniki; Salina de la Renta
- Billed height: 5 ft 8 in (173 cm)
- Billed weight: 141 lb (64 kg)
- Billed from: Dorado, Puerto Rico
- Trained by: Aaron Epic; Jesús Rodríguez; Santana Garrett
- Debut: September 3, 2016

Natalia Class (born February 6, 1997) is a Puerto Rican professional wrestler, valet and actress better known by her ring name Salina de la Renta. She is currently signed to Major League Wrestling (MLW), where she works on-screen as the Vice President of Wrestler Relations, a member of the House of Duran stable and, behind the scenes as the Creative Director of the Women's Division. As Salina de la Renta she has received several monickers, including “The Empresaria”, “The Puerto Rican Power Broker” and “La Bruja”.

In 2019, Class became the first-ever Latina to serve as executive producer for a professional wrestling show on American national television, being credited for an episode of MLW Fusion. While working for that promotion, she also became the “first Spanish female announcer to call weekly pro wrestling” in that market.

== Personal life ==
Class attended Saint Francis High School and the Colegio Bautista de Carolina in Carolina, Puerto Rico. She moved to Orlando, Florida in 2014, attending Lake Nona High School, where she played volleyball and served as the team captain of the soccer team. Class then enrolled at Valencia College in Orlando, where she studied film and screenwriting. In 2021 de la Renta graduated from Valencia College with an associate degree in Dramatic Arts and shortly after was accepted into Full Sail University in Winter Park Florida where she earned a Master's Degree on Innovation and Entrepreneurship. Class and her boyfriend Jovan Fresco welcomed their first child in November 14, 2024.

Class was an early member of Masked Republic, a company described as “ the player’s association of lucha libre” which offer services for wrestlers to “manage their brand, negotiate their contracts and expand their influence outside the ring”. Her family recipe of Puerto Rican cornbread was included in the book Eat like a Luchador: The Official Cookbook.

== Professional wrestling career ==
=== Independent circuit (2016–2018) ===
Class made her wrestling debut at IBIW's "BELIEVE 127" under the ring name "Mila Naniki", teaming with Thea Trinidad and Raegan Fire in a losing effort to Dominique Fabiano, Raquel & Santana Garrett. She wrestled against at BELIEVE 130 on October 15, this time teaming with Raegan Fire in a tag team match against Courtney Stewart and Kaci Lennox. Three days later on October 18, at Girl Fight Wrestling 12, Naniki won her first singles match by defeating Kaci Lennox. On November 4 at Wrestle Aid Orlando "Redemption", Naniki lost the rematch against Kaci Lennox. At BELIEVE 131 on November 5, Naniki once again teamed with Raegan Fire in a tag match won by Courtney Stewart and Kaci Lennox. Naniki finished her debut year on December 3 at BELIEVE 132 with a victory over Raegan Fire.

On January 13, 2017, Naniki returned to IBIW at BELIEVE 133. At BELIEVE 134, she teamed with former TNA Knockout Raquel in a tag team match against Thea Trinidad & Kaci Lennox. On March 3 at BELIEVE 136, Naniki teamed with Aria Blake to defeat Kaci Lennox and Layne Rosario in a tag team match. On March 17 at BELIEVE 137, she defeated Kaci Lennox in a singles match. The following week on March 22 at American Combat Wrestling's "Proving Ground", Naniki defeated Aspyn Rose. On March 25 at Pro Wrestling 2.0's "Beauties, Beast And Champion", she competed in a mixed tag match against Aria Blake & Trish Adora. She also competed at PW2.0's "Legends And Heroes" on March 28,. The next day, March 29, at ACW "Proving Ground", Naniki wrestled Isla Dawn. She returned to ACW two months later to on June 7 to defeat Aria Blake. On June 11 she made her Massachusetts debut for Big Time Wrestling in a losing effort against Amber Nova. Naniki returned to IBIW at BELIEVE 145 on September 1, teaming with Aria Blake against Kaci Lennox and Miss Hannah.

=== Major League Wrestling (2018–2021) ===
After joining Major League Wrestling (MLW) in 2019, she performed as Salina de la Renta in a managerial and on-screen personality role. Backstage, she served as the executive producer of several episodes of Fusion. As the forewoman and power broker of a group known as Promociones Dorado, a talent agency purportedly headquartered at Dorado, Puerto Rico, which was billed as “a pipeline to the stars of Latin America for sports leagues, TV and film in the United States and abroad”. As “The Empresaria” De la Renta immediately ser her sights on securing “gold” for her agency, targeting titilara such as MLW World Heavyweight Champion Shane Strickland. She managed Low Ki to a win over the latter, keeping his charge during the subsequent reign. De la Renta also managed the Lucha Brothers (Pentagón Jr. and Fénix), when they won the MLW World Tag Team Championship. Other members of Promociones Dorado included Maxx Stardom, L.A. Park, El Hijo de L.A. Park and Bestia 666, with Cristóbal Culebra as Head of Security. Those that failed to further the agenda of Promociones Dorado were fired, as was the case with Sammy Guevara and Low Ki.

De la Renta led the faction as the main villainous group in 2018, being supplanted in the role by Contra Unit during 2019, and was placed in direct opposition to Konnan and became involved in feuds with other talents including Sami Callihan and Mance Warner. During this timeframe she brought IWA Caribbean Heavyweight Champion Savio Vega to Promociones Dorado (which he later left by ripping his contract). De la Renta managed L.A. Park when he won the Golden Ticket price at 2019 Battle Riot. Promociones Dorado then feuded with Mancer, who stole the prize and retrieved her iPhone, which he handed over to Konnan with the “sensitive information” stored within. Martínez failed to defeat him, while he terrorized the group with a chainsaw. She was written off programming for six months after receiving an accidental impact while managing L.A. Park (who cashed in the recovered Golden Ticket) in a titular match against Jacob Fatu at Saturday Night SuperFight. Her absence was explained as a “a blow up with Court Bauer”.

Following her initial contract with MLW, Class resigned in 2020 and resumed her appearances, now said to have acquired “promoting and managing licenses”. During her second run with MLW, she was presented as acting on behalf of a shady businessman (known for months simply as “El Jefe”) that had acquired Promociones Dorado. Her feud with Konnan resumed, when he revealed that Promociones Dorado was struggling economically and that De la Renta had aided Contra Unit in their agenda against MLW. This led to disciplinary sanctions against her and postpone the airing of a special that she was scheduled to executive produce. De la Renta was cleared to proceed and traveled to Mexico, later promising to reveal a “bombshell” about Konnan. She was later blamed for an attack that landed him on MLW's injured list and was accompanied by a prolonged absence from programming.

She made moves to expand “El Jefe’s” interests by, among other things, unsuccessfully bidding to purchase IWA-PR from Vega. When this failed, De la Renta summoned Mil Muertes in the beginning of a storyline that saw the arrival of several Lucha Underground characters as part of an organization called Azteca Underground. In January 2021, she managed Los Parks when they won the World Tag Team Championship. When several of her stablemates tested positive for COVID-19, Class revealed that she had likely contracted the virus. During the following months, De la Renta was portrayed as increasingly concerned with the shortcomings of Azteca Underground, as L.A. Park spoke against her on behalf of her longtime clients as they favored “El Jefe”. In May 2021, this narrative came to an end as she was “sacrificed” by the newly arrived Dario Cueto as a way to explain her departure from MLW.

Class participated in a tryout for WWE, where she was asked to perform inside the ring and not to cut a promo, which intrigued her as she only had 95 matches and mostly distinguished herself as a manager. She noted that after Canyon Ceman was released from his role as Senior Director of Talent Development, no further contact was made by the company.

=== Return to MLW (2023–present) ===
On September 3, 2023 at Fury Road, de la Renta returned to MLW as the first guest of "Sessions by Saint Laurent," resurrecting her Promociones Dorado stable. During her appearance, she teased the prospect of a new client, which she promised to reveal at Slaughterhouse. At the event, de la Renta accompanied both Janai Kai and Rocky Romero for their matches. In March 2024, she also became the Creative Director of the Women's Division. On June 9, 2025 it was announced that de la Renta was named as Vice President of Wrestler Relations In MLW.

== Championships and accomplishments ==
- American Combat Wrestling
  - ACW Women's Champion (1 time)
- Lingerie Fighting Championships
  - LFC Booty Camp Champion (1 time)

== Television career ==
Class appeared as a contestant on The Floor she was eliminated in the second episode of the first season.
