= List of current champions in Major League Wrestling =

Current champions in Major League Wrestling

Major League Wrestling (MLW) is an American professional wrestling promotion based in New Rochelle, New York. Title reigns are either determined by professional wrestling matches or are awarded to a wrestler as a result of the culmination of various scripted storylines. There are currently five championships in MLW.

There are three singles, one traditional tag team championship for male wrestlers and one singles championship for female wrestlers.

As of November 12, 2026, five wrestlers officially hold championships. This list includes the number of times the wrestler has held the title, the date and location of the win, and a description of the winning bout.

== Overview ==
The American professional wrestling promotion Major League Wrestling (MLW) promotes several professional wrestling championships for its men's and women's divisions. MLW often broadcasts championship matches on their weekly streaming program while also regularly being featured on online programs. Major championship defenses also occur at MLW’s periodic pay-per-view events.

=== Men ===
At the top of MLW's championship hierarchy for male wrestlers is the MLW World Heavyweight Championship. It is currently held by Josh Bishop who defeated Killer Kross at Saturday Night SuperFight to win the title.

The secondary title for male wrestlers is the MLW National Openweight Championship, which is held by Austin Aries who defeated Blue Panther.

The other secondary title for male wrestlers is the MLW Southern Crown Championship, which is held by Joe Coffey who defeated Trevor Lee.

The MLW World Middleweight Championship is a specialty championship, featuring matches being conducted under the company's "Cruiserweight & Lightweight division". It is currently held by first time champion Kushida who defeated Templario to win the title.

The MLW World Tag Team Championship is MLW's traditional tag team title, being contested by teams of two wrestlers. The current champions are The Good Brothers (Doc Gallows and Karl Anderson) who defeated The Skyscrapers (Donovan Dijak and Josh Bishop). They are in their first reign both as a team and individually.

=== Women ===
MLW has one championship for its women's division. The title is called the MLW World Women's Featherweight Championship, which is held by Shotzi Blackheart for the first time who defeated Shoko Nakajima.

== Current champions ==
As of November 12, 2026.

=== Men's division ===
Singles

Championship	Current champion(s)	Reign	Date won	Days held	Location	Notes	Ref.
MLW World Heavyweight Championship	Josh Bishop	1	November 7, 2026	5+	Cicero, Illinois	Defeated Killer Kross in a Last Man Standing match at Saturday Night SuperFight.	
MLW National Openweight Championship	Matt Riddle	1	November 8, 2026	4+	Cicero, Illinois	Defeated Austin Aries at Lucha de los Muertos.	
MLW World Middleweight Championship	Templario	2	May 1, 2026	195+	Mexico City, Mexico	Defeated Kushida on CMLL Viernes Espectacular: CMLL vs. MLW	
MLW Southern Crown Championship	LaBron Kozone	1	October 3, 2026	40+	Atlanta, Georgia	Defeated Joe Coffey on Fusion.	

Tag team

Championship	Current champion(s)	Reign	Date won	Days held	Location	Notes	Ref.
MLW World Tag Team Championship	The Good Brothers (Doc Gallows and Karl Anderson)	1	May 9, 2026	187+	Chattanooga, Tennessee	Defeated The Skyscrapers (Donovan Dijak and Bishop Dyer) in a Tennessee Tornado match on Fusion.	

=== Women's division ===
Championship	Current champion(s)	Reign	Date won	Days held	Location	Notes	Ref.
MLW World Women's Featherweight Championship	Masha	1	September 12, 2026	61+	Charleston, South Carolina	Defeated Shotzi Blackheart on Fusion. Will air on tape delay.	

== See also ==
- List of Major League Wrestling personnel
- MLW Underground TV
- MLW Fusion
- MLW Underground Wrestling
