= Fightland (2026) =

2026 Major League Wrestling event

- Promotional poster
- Promotion: Major League Wrestling
- Date: September 12, 2026 (aired September 24, 2026)
- City: Charleston, South Carolina
- Venue: Festival Hall

Event chronology
← Previous; Summer of the Beasts	Next → Slaughterhouse

Fightland chronology
← Previous; 2025	Next → —

Fightland (2026) was a professional wrestling event produced by Major League Wrestling (MLW). It was the eighth Fightland event and took place on September 12, 2026, at Festival Hall in Charleston, South Carolina.

The event was a television taping for MLW Fusion, with the main card airing as a special episode on Tubi and MLW's YouTube channel on September 24, 2026.

== Production ==
=== Background ===
Fightland is a recurring event produced by Major League Wrestling (MLW) that was first held in 2018 as a television taping for MLW's weekly program, MLW Fusion.

On April 13, 2026, MLW announced that Fightland, plus matches being taped for Fusion, would take place on September 12 at Festival Hall in Charleston, South Carolina.

On September 19, 2026, MLW announced that they had signed a distribution deal with Tubi to bring new episodes of Fusion to the service. Fightland would be the second episode of Fusion to air on Tubi.

=== Storylines ===
The card consisted of matches that result from scripted storylines, where wrestlers portrayed villains, heroes, or less distinguishable characters in scripted events that built tension and culminate in a wrestling match or series of matches, with results predetermined by MLW, NJPW, and CMLL's writers. Storylines were played out on MLW's weekly show MLW Fusion.

On September 1, MLW announced that Tessa Blanchard had signed with the promotion, and would make her debut at Fightland. Just days later, however, MLW removed all references to Blanchard, including her roster page and promotional material, from their website without explanation. CMLL, a partner of MLW's and Blanchard's home promotion, claimed that Blanchard had nothing beyond a "one-date agreement" with the two promotions concerning her MLW appearance. Blanchard was later announced to compete on a CMLL show the same night as Fightland. It was eventually clarified that Blanchard's appearance at Fightland was meant to be a one-off and that she would not sign a long-term contract with MLW.

== Results ==
No.	Results	Stipulations	Times
1	Templario defeated Black Tiger by pinfall	Singles match	9:02
2	Masha (with Josef Samael) defeated Lady Frost by pinfall	Singles match	8:10
3	Josh Bishop and Killer Kross defeated Austin Aries and Mistico by submission	Taboo Tangle tag team match	10:27
4^{FT}	Jazzy Yang (with Corinne Joy) defeated Clara Carter by pinfall	Singles match	—
5^{FT}	Zamaya defeated Jazzy Yang and Corinne Joy by pinfall	Handicap match	—
6^{FT}	Joe Coffey (c) defeated CJ Gallows by pinfall	Singles match for the MLW Southern Crown Championship	—
7^{FT}	Donovan Dijak vs. Josh Bishop ended in a no contest	Singles match	—
8^{FT}	LaBron Kozone defeated Trevor Lee, Diego Hill, and Terry Sampolla	Four-way match	—
9^{FT}	Contra Unit (4 TBA) defeated Andrew Everett, Chase Emery, Terry Yaki, and TBA	Eight-man tag team match	—
10^{FT}	Jumbo defeated The Beastman by pinfall	Singles match	—
11^{FT}	Paul Walter Hauser defeated Cody Fluffman by pinfall	Singles match	—
12^{FT}	The Good Brothers (Doc Gallows and Karl Anderson) (c) defeated Glasgow Boys On Top (Joe Coffey and Wolfgang) by pinfall)	Tag team match for the MLW World Tag Team Championship	—
13^{FT}	Masha (with Josef Samael) defeated Shotzi (c) by pinfall	Singles match for the MLW World Women's Featherweight Championship	—
14^{FT}	Austin Aries defeated Matt Riddle by pinfall	2026 Opera Cup Finals	—
(c) / – the champion(s) heading into the match; FT / – the match was taped for a future broadcast of Fusion

=== Opera Cup tournament brackets (2026) ===
First round Fusion (June 11); Summer of the Beasts (June 12)
Matt Riddle	Pin
Mark Coffey	7:45
Ikuro Kwon	Pin
Andrew Everett	7:07
Big Damo	Pin
Wolfgang	6:09
Oddyssey	Pin
Okumura	2:44
Austin Aries	Pin
Tracy Williams	8:35
Místico	14:52
Trevor Lee	Countout
LaBron Kozone	Pin
Joe Coffey	8:16
Diego Hill	Pin
Anthony Greene	6:34

Quarterfinals; Summer of the Beasts (June 12); Fusion (June 13)
Matt Riddle	Pin
Ikuro Kwon	4:22
Big Damo	Countout
Oddyssey	9:19
Austin Aries	Pin
Trevor Lee	12:35
LaBron Kozone	Pin
Diego Hill	6:51

Semifinals; Fusion (June 13)
Matt Riddle	Pin
Big Damo
Austin Aries	Pin
LaBron Kozone

Final; Fightland (September 12)
Matt Riddle
Austin Aries	Pin
