= Saturday Night SuperFight (2026) =

2026 Major League Wrestling pay-per-view event

- Promotional poster
- Promotion: Major League Wrestling
- Date: November 7, 2026
- City: Cicero, Illinois
- Venue: Cicero Stadium

Pay-per-view chronology
← Previous; Saturday Night SuperFight (2019)	Next → —

Event chronology
← Previous; Slaughterhouse	Next → Lucha de los Muertos

SuperFight chronology
← Previous; 6	Next → —

Saturday Night SuperFight (2026) was a professional wrestling pay-per-view event produced by Major League Wrestling (MLW) that took place on November 7, 2026, at Cicero Stadium in Cicero, Illinois and was streamed live on Veeps. It was the seventh event under the SuperFight chronology, and MLW's second-ever pay-per-view event following the previous Saturday Night SuperFight event from 2019. It featured wrestlers from partner promotions New Japan Pro-Wrestling (NJPW) and Consejo Mundial de Lucha Libre (CMLL).

== Production ==
=== Background ===
SuperFight is an annual professional wrestling supercard event produced by Major League Wrestling. The first event was broadcast as a special live episode of the promotion's weekly series, MLW Fusion, that aired on February 2, 2019. inaugural Superfight was the second live special in the show's history. On November 2, 2019, MLW held its first pay-per-view event titled Saturday Night Superfight which aired on traditional pay-per-view outlets and was streamed on FITE TV.

During MLW x Don Gato Tequila: Lucha de los Muertos on November 20, 2025, it was announced that Fusion would return in 2026. In addition to streaming on the promotion's YouTube channel, MLW announced on May 26 that the new season of Fusion would stream on Live Nation Entertainment's Veeps. On September 30, 2026, MLW announced that they would be holding their second-ever pay-per-view event, Saturday Night Superfight, and that it would be streamed live on Veeps. On October 6, 2026, MLW announced that tickets for Saturday Night SuperFight had been sold out.

=== Storylines ===
Saturday Night SuperFight consisted of matches that result from scripted storylines, where wrestlers portrayed villains, heroes, or less distinguishable characters in scripted events that built tension and culminate in a wrestling match or series of matches, with results predetermined by MLW, NJPW, and CMLL's writers. Storylines were played out on MLW's weekly show MLW Fusion.

==== Cross-promotional debuts ====
Two days after announcing Saturday Night SuperFight, MLW revealed that Tessa Blanchard, originally set to debut for the promotion earlier in 2026, would compete at the event. On October 16, it was revealed that IWGP Heavyweight Champion Yota Tsuji would also appear at the event.

==== Championship matches ====
Since the August 22 episode of Fusion, MLW World Heavyweight Champion Killer Kross engaged in a feud with The Skyscrapers (Donovan Dijak, Bishop Dyer, and Josh Bishop). Kross had called out for new competition when he was confronted by The Skyscrapers, leading to a physical altercation. Two weeks later at Kings of Colosseum, Kross defeated Bishop in a No Holds Barred match to retain the title. Following this and Dyer leaving MLW to return to WWE, Dijak began to assert more authority in the Skyscrapers, saying that Bishop needed to "follow orders" and refusing to let him speak. At Fightland, Kross and Bishop defeated Místico and MLW National Openweight Champion Austin Aries in a "Taboo Tangle" match. The following week on Fusion, Kross and his wife Scarlett Bordeaux were cutting a promo in the ring when the Skyscrapers interrupted. Kross then poked at the growing tension between Dijak and Bishop, questioning why the latter needed the former's permission to ask for a title opportunity, while Dijak claimed leadership of the team. The week after, The Skyscrapers defeated Kross and Matt Riddle, with Bishop pinning Kross for the first time in MLW in four years. Kross would cut another promo the next week, saying that MLW is a company that doesn't hold back talent. This drew attention from The Skyscrapers, with Dijak again withholding Bishop from talking as he demanded a title shot of his own. MLW commentator Rich Bocchini later announced that Kross would defend the MLW World Heavyweight Championship against Bishop once again at Saturday Night SuperFight, this time in a Last Man Standing match. The week after, following a quick victory by Bishop, he would call Kross out for a title shot, with Dijak admonishing him for speaking out of turn; Bishop would later get into a parking lot brawl with Kross, who formally granted him another opportunity. On the November 5 episode of Fusion, two days before Saturday Night SuperFight, Kross defeated Dijak to remain champion. Bishop would confront Kross afterwards, but after another demeaning comment from Dijak, Bishop would attack and put Dijak through a table, effectively ending the Skyscrapers.

For several months, Glasgow Boys On Top (GBOT) (Joe Coffey, Mark Coffey, and Wolfgang) had been demanding a match for the MLW World Tag Team Championship, held currently by The Good Brothers (Doc Gallows and Karl Anderson). On the October 15 episode of Fusion, attempting to gain the champions' attention, GBOT attacked Gallows' 18-year-old son, CJ Gallows, in the arena parking lot, preventing CJ from having his debut match. The following week, Joe Coffey mockingly dedicated his win over Andrew Everett to CJ, who was hospitalized as a result of GBOT's attack. Later in the night, a furious Gallows and Anderson granted GBOT a title opportunity at Saturday Night SuperFight in a Chicago Street Fight.

During the June 11 and 12 tapings for Fusion, which later aired starting on October 1, Austin Aries claimed in interview that he would be the favorite to win the Opera Cup tournament; he notably singled out Matt Riddle, who was on the opposite side of bracket, saying he was "too fast" for Riddle to handle. The following week, Riddle had an interview of his own which was interrupted by Aries, the two getting into a heated argument as Aries said Riddle would never get an opportunity at his MLW National Openweight Championship. On October 29, Aries and Riddle got into another confrontation as they mutally agreed to a title match at Saturday Night SuperFight. At the Fusion taping held before Fightland, a month before the title match was made official, Aries defeated Riddle in the finals of the Opera Cup.

== Results ==
No.	Results	Stipulations	Times
1	The Good Brothers (Doc Gallows and Karl Anderson) (c) (with CJ Gallows) defeated Glasgow Boys On Top (Joe Coffey and Mark Coffey) (with Wolfgang) by pinfall	Chicago Street Fight for the MLW World Tag Team Championship	11:30
2	Masha (with Josef Samael) defeated Zamaya by pinfall	Singles match	8:33
3	Tessa Blanchard defeated Keyra by pinfall	Singles match	10:31
4	Austin Aries (c) vs. Matt Riddle ended in a time limit draw	Singles match for the MLW National Openweight Championship	30:00
5	Último Guerrero defeated Templario and Titán by pinfall	Three-way match	11:10
6	Yota Tsuji defeated Trevor Lee by pinfall	Singles match	15:13
7	Josh Bishop defeated Killer Kross (c)	Last Man Standing match for the MLW World Heavyweight Championship	17:11
8^{D}	Místico defeated Esfinge by submission	Singles match	—
(c) / – the champion(s) heading into the match; D / – this was a dark match
