= Opera Cup (2026) =

2026 Major League Wrestling tournament

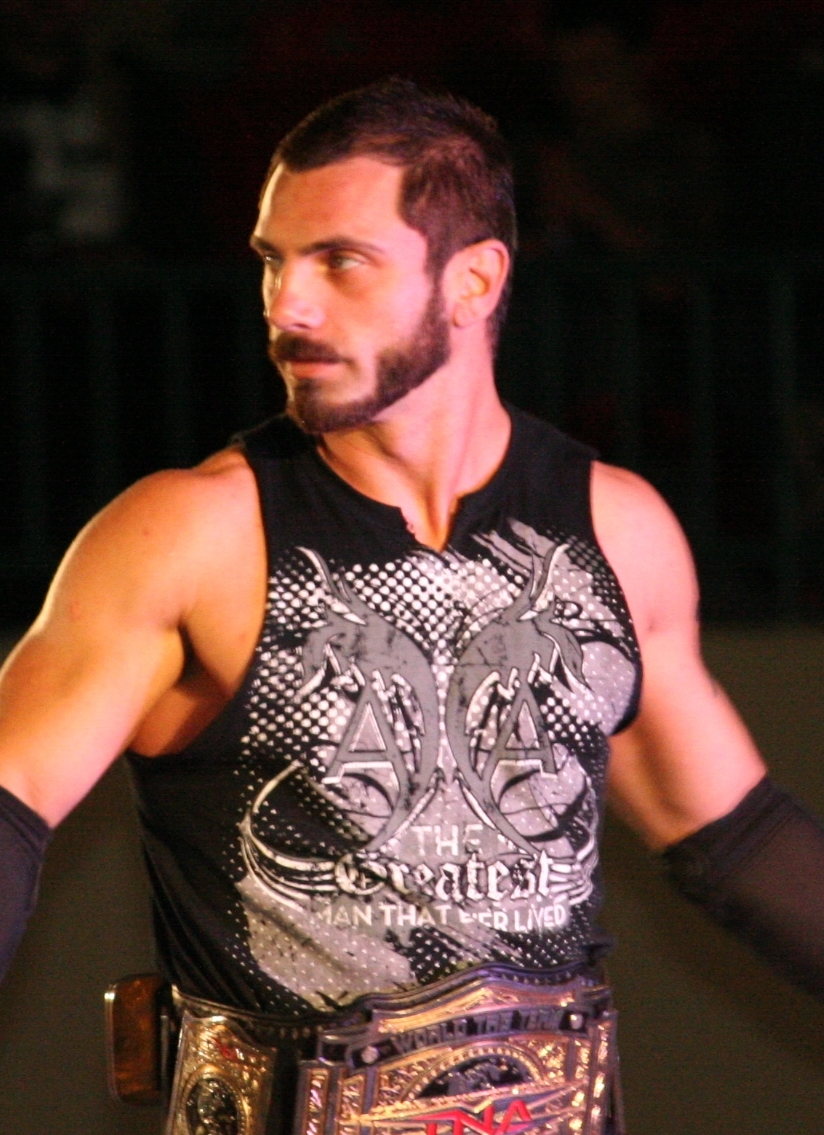
- The 2026 winner Austin Aries
- Venue: First Round: Melrose Ballroom (June 11); 2300 Arena (June 12); Quarterfinals: 2300 Arena (June 12–13); Semifinals: 2300 Arena (June 13); Finals: Festival Hall (September 12)
- Location: First Round: Queens, New York (June 11); Philadelphia, Pennsylvania (June 12); Quarterfinals: Philadelphia, Pennsylvania (June 12–13); Semifinals: Philadelphia, Pennsylvania (June 13); Finals: Charleston, South Carolina (September 12)
- Start date: June 11, 2026
- End date: September 12, 2026
- Competitors: Andrew Everett; Anthony Greene; Big Damo; Diego Hill; Ikuro Kwon; Joe Coffey; LaBron Kozone; Mark Coffey; Matt Riddle; Místico; Oddyssey; Okumura; Tracy Williams; Trevor Lee; Wolfgang

Champion
- Austin Aries

Opera Cup (2026) was the sixth Opera Cup professional wrestling tournament produced by Major League Wrestling (MLW). The first round began on June 11, 2026, at the Melrose Ballroom in Queens, New York. The final first round match, as well as the quarterfinals and semifinals, continued the following two days between June 12–13, at the 2300 Arena in Philadelphia, Pennsylvania. The tournament concluded with the finals on September 12, at Festival Hall in Charleston, South Carolina. The tournament would air on tape delay on MLW's weekly series, MLW Fusion, on Tubi and YouTube.

== Production ==
=== Background ===
The Opera House Cup was annually held as a professional wrestling tournament for nearly fifty years in various cities in the United States until its discontinuation in 1948. Stu Hart won the final tournament and kept possession of the Opera Cup trophy since then. On July 21, 2019, Major League Wrestling announced that it would be holding an event on December 5 at the Melrose Ballroom in Queens, New York City, New York which would be a set of television tapings of MLW's television program Fusion. On July 24, it was reported that Stu Hart's grandson and MLW wrestler Teddy Hart would be donating an inherited "family heirloom" to MLW. On July 30, MLW.com announced that the family heirloom was Stu Hart's Opera Cup trophy and MLW would be bringing back the Opera Cup tournament on the December 5 supercard, naming it Opera Cup.

=== Storylines ===
The tournament consists of matches that result from scripted storylines, where wrestlers portray villains, heroes, or less distinguishable characters in scripted events that build tension and culminated in a wrestling match or series of matches, with results predetermined by MLW's writers. Storylines were played out on MLW's weekly television program Fusion, and MLW's social media channels.

== Results ==
First round (June 11)
No.	Results	Stipulations	Times
1	LaBron Kozone defeated Joe Coffey (with Wolfgang and Mark Coffey) by pinfall	Singles match	8:16
2	Diego Hill defeated Anthony Greene by pinfall	Singles match	6:34
3	Austin Aries defeated Tracy Williams by pinfall	Singles match	8:35
4	Oddyssey defeated Okumura (with Ikuro Kwon) by pinfall	Singles match	2:44
5	Trevor Lee defeated Místico by countout	Singles match	14:52
6	Ikuro Kwon (with Josef Samael) defeated Andrew Everett by pinfall	Singles match	7:07
7	Big Damo (with Josef Samael) defeated Wolfgang by pinfall	Singles match	6:09

First round (June 12)
No.	Results	Stipulations	Times
1	Matt Riddle defeated Mark Coffey (with Joe Coffey and Wolfgang) by pinfall	Singles match	7:45

Quarterfinals (June 12)
No.	Results	Stipulations	Times
1	Austin Aries defeated Trevor Lee by pinfall	Singles match	12:35
2	LaBron Kozone defeated Diego Hill by pinfall	Singles match	6:51
3	Big Damo (with Josef Samael) defeated Oddyssey by countout	Singles match	9:19

Quarterfinals (June 13)
No.	Results	Stipulations	Times
1	Matt Riddle defeated Ikuro Kwon by pinfall	Singles match	4:22

Semifinals (June 13)
No.	Results	Stipulations	Times
1	Austin Aries defeated LaBron Kozone by pinfall	Singles match	10:19
2	Matt Riddle defeated Big Damo by pinfall	Singles match	—

Finals (September 12)
No.	Results	Stipulations
1	Austin Aries defeated Matt Riddle by pinfall	Singles match

== Tournament brackets ==
First round Fusion (June 11); Summer of the Beasts (June 12)
Matt Riddle	Pin
Mark Coffey	7:45
Ikuro Kwon	Pin
Andrew Everett	7:07
Big Damo	Pin
Wolfgang	6:09
Oddyssey	Pin
Okumura	2:44
Austin Aries	Pin
Tracy Williams	8:35
Místico	14:52
Trevor Lee	Countout
LaBron Kozone	Pin
Joe Coffey	8:16
Diego Hill	Pin
Anthony Greene	6:34

Quarterfinals; Summer of the Beasts (June 12); Fusion (June 13)
Matt Riddle	Pin
Ikuro Kwon	4:22
Big Damo	Countout
Oddyssey	9:19
Austin Aries	Pin
Trevor Lee	12:35
LaBron Kozone	Pin
Diego Hill	6:51

Semifinals; Fusion (June 13)
Matt Riddle	Pin
Big Damo
Austin Aries	Pin
LaBron Kozone	10:19

Final; Fightland (September 12)
Matt Riddle
Austin Aries	Pin
