= Summer of the Beasts (2026) =

2026 Major League Wrestling event

- Promotion: Major League Wrestling
- Date: June 12, 2026 (aired October 22‒November 5, 2026)
- City: Philadelphia, Pennsylvania
- Venue: 2300 Arena

Event chronology
← Previous; Kings of Colosseum	Next → Fightland

Summer of the Beasts chronology
← Previous; 2025	Next → —

Summer of the Beasts (2026) was a professional wrestling event produced by Major League Wrestling (MLW). It took place on June 12, 2026, at the 2300 Arena in Philadelphia, Pennsylvania. It was the third event in the Summer of the Beasts chronology and served as a television taping for MLW's weekly series, MLW Fusion.

== Production ==
=== Background ===
Summer of the Beasts is a professional wrestling supercard event produced by Major League Wrestling. The first event was broadcast on August 29, 2024.

On February 17, 2026, MLW announced two events to be held at the 2300 Arena in Philadelphia, Pennsylvania between June 12–13, with Summer of the Beasts taking place on the former date.

=== Storylines ===
The card consisted of matches that result from scripted storylines, where wrestlers portrayed villains, heroes, or less distinguishable characters in scripted events that built tension and culminate in a wrestling match or series of matches, with results predetermined by MLW's writers. Storylines were played out at MLW events, and across the league's social media platforms.

== Results ==
No.	Results	Stipulations	Times
1	Okumura (with Ikuro Kwon) defeated Love, Doug by submission	Lightning match (Fusion – October 15)	1:58
2	Zamaya defeated Tiara James by pinfall	Singles match (Fusion – October 15)	0:10
3	Matt Riddle defeated Mark Coffey (with Joe Coffey and Wolfgang) by pinfall	2026 Opera Cup tournament first round match (Fusion – October 15)	7:45
4	Shotzi (c) defeated Rina by pinfall	Singles match for the MLW World Women's Featherweight Championship (Fusion – October 15)	9:33
5	Joe Coffey (with Mark Coffey and Wolfgang) defeated Andrew Everett by pinfall	Singles match (Fusion – October 22)	6:36
6	Saya Kamitani (with Rina) defeated Lady Frost by pinfall	Singles match (Fusion – October 22)	7:45
7	Austin Aries defeated Trevor Lee by pinfall	2026 Opera Cup tournament quarterfinal match (Fusion – October 22)	12:35
8	Josh Bishop (with Donovan Dijak) defeated Rich Moya by pinfall	Singles match (Fusion – October 22)	1:40
9	Wolfgang (with Mark Coffey) defeated The Beastman (with Kimchee by pinfall	Singles match (Fusion – October 29)	5:22
10	LaBron Kozone defeated Diego Hill by pinfall	2026 Opera Cup tournament quarterfinal match (Fusion – October 29)	6:51
11	Templario defeated Ikuro Kwon (with Okumura) and Soberano Jr. by pinfall	Three-way match (Fusion – November 5)	7:58
12	Brick Savage (with Josef Samael) defeated Trevor Lee by pinfall	Singles match	—
13	Big Damo (with Josef Samael) defeated Oddyssey by pinfall	2026 Opera Cup tournament quarterfinal match (Fusion – November 5)	9:19
14	Jumbo defeated Breaux Kelly and Joey Martinez	Handicap match (Fusion – November 5)	1:01
15	Killer Kross (c) (with Scarlett Bordeaux) defeated Donovan Dijak by submission	Singles match for the MLW World Heavyweight Championship (Fusion – November 5)	12:36
(c) / – the champion(s) heading into the match
