= MLW Fightland =

Fightland
- Promotions: Major League Wrestling
- First event: Fightland (2018)

MLW Fightland is an annual professional wrestling supercard event produced by Major League Wrestling (MLW) that was first held in 2018.

The 2018, 2020, and 2022 events were television tapings for MLW Fusion; while other matches from the 2022 event aired as part of MLW Underground Wrestling. The third event aired as a standalone special on October 7, 2021 on Vice TV, with additional matches taped for the MLW Fusion: Alpha miniseries.

== Dates and venues ==
Aired Live

#	Event	Date	City	Venue	Main Event	Ref
1	Fightland (2018)	November 8, 2018	Cicero, Illinois	Cicero Stadium	The Lucha Brothers (Pentagon Jr. and Rey Fénix) (c) vs. El Hijo de LA Park and LA Park for the MLW World Tag Team Championship	
2	Fightland (2020)	February 1, 2020	Philadelphia, Pennsylvania	2300 Arena	Jacob Fatu (c) vs. Cima for the MLW World Heavyweight Championship	
3	Fightland (2021)	October 2, 2021	Philadelphia, Pennsylvania	2300 Arena	Jacob Fatu (c-World) vs. Alexander Hammerstone (c-National) in a Title vs. Title No Disqualification match for the MLW World Heavyweight Championship and the MLW National Openweight Championship	
4	Fightland (2022)	October 30, 2022	Philadelphia, Pennsylvania	2300 Arena	Jacob Fatu vs. Lio Rush	
5	Fightland (2023)	November 18, 2023	Philadelphia, Pennsylvania	2300 Arena	Alex Kane (c) vs. Jacob Fatu for the MLW World Heavyweight Championship	
6	Fightland (2024)	September 14, 2024	Atlanta, Georgia	Center Stage	Mistico vs. Kenta in the 2024 Opera Cup tournament finals	
7	Fightland (2025)	September 13, 2025	North Richland Hills, Texas	NYTEX Sports Centre	Matt Riddle (c) vs. Donovan Dijak vs. Mads Krule Krügger for the MLW World Heavyweight Championship	
7	Fightland (2026)	September 12, 2026	Charleston, South Carolina	Festival Hall	Killer Kross and Josh Bishop vs. Austin Aries and Místico	
