= Slaughterhouse (2026) =

2026 Major League Wrestling event

- Promotion: Major League Wrestling
- Date: October 4, 2026
- City: Atlanta, Georgia
- Venue: Center Stage

Event chronology
← Previous; Fightland	Next → Saturday Night SuperFight

Slaughterhouse chronology
← Previous; 2025	Next → —

Slaughterhouse (2026) was a professional wrestling event produced by Major League Wrestling (MLW). It took place on October 4, 2026, at Center Stage in Atlanta, Georgia. It was the fourth event in the Slaughterhouse chronology and served as a taping for MLW's weekly series, MLW Fusion.

== Production ==
=== Background ===
Slaugherhouse is an event produced by Major League Wrestling (MLW) that was first held in 2023. Its name originated from a 2019 special episode of the promotion's television series, MLW Fusion, called "Jimmy Havoc's Slaughterhouse".

On June 15, 2026, MLW originally announced that Slaughterhouse would take place on October 4, 2026, at the 2300 Arena in Philadelphia, Pennsylvania. However, on August 4, due to what MLW claimed was a "breach of agreement," it was announced that Slaughterhouse would instead be held at Center Stage in Atlanta, Georgia.

=== Storylines ===
The card consisted of matches that result from scripted storylines, where wrestlers portray villains, heroes, or less distinguishable characters in scripted events that built tension and culminate in a wrestling match or series of matches, with results predetermined by MLW's writers. Storylines are played out at MLW events and across the league's social media platforms.

== Results ==
No.	Results	Stipulations
1	Killer Kross (c) vs. Místico ended in a no contest	Singles match for the MLW World Heavyweight Championship
2	Trevor Lee defeated Black Tiger	Singles match
3	Glasgow Boys On Top (Joe Coffey, Mark Coffey, and Wolfgang) defeated The Good Brothers (Doc Gallows and Karl Anderson) and CJ Gallows	Six-man tag team match
4	Josh Bishop defeated Donovan Dijak	Falls Count Anywhere match
5	Contra Unit (Big Damo and Brick Savage) defeated Diego Hill and Terry Yaki	Tag team match
6	Zamaya defeated Jazzy Yang and Corinne Joy	Handicap match
7	LaBron Kozone defeated Joe Coffey (c)	Singles match for the MLW Southern Crown Championship
8	Masha (c) defeated Shotzi	Weapons of Mass Destruction match for the MLW World Women's Featherweight Championship
9	Paul Walter Hauser defeated Andrew Everett	Singles match
10	J–Rod defeated Lady Frost	Singles match
11	Matt Riddle defeated Austin Aries	Singles match
12	Jumbo won by last eliminating TBD	Battle royal
(c) / – the champion(s) heading into the match
