= List of Major League Wrestling personnel =

Personnel of Major League Wrestling

Major League Wrestling (MLW) is an American professional wrestling promotion based in Charleston, South Carolina.

Active wrestlers and on-screen talent appear on MLW Fusion and at live events. Personnel is organized below by their role in MLW. Their ring name is on the left, and their real name is on the right. MLW refers to its in-ring performers as "Fighters" as opposed to the traditional nomenclature "wrestlers" to separate itself from other promotions, along with referring to the traditional position of manager/valet as "promoter."

MLW has international promotional partnerships with Consejo Mundial de Lucha Libre (CMLL), Revolution Pro Wrestling (RPW), Tokyo Joshi Pro-Wrestling (TJPW), and New Japan Pro-Wrestling (NJPW). Wrestlers from those promotions may make occasional appearances on MLW events and programming.

== Roster ==
=== Wrestlers ===
Matt Riddle

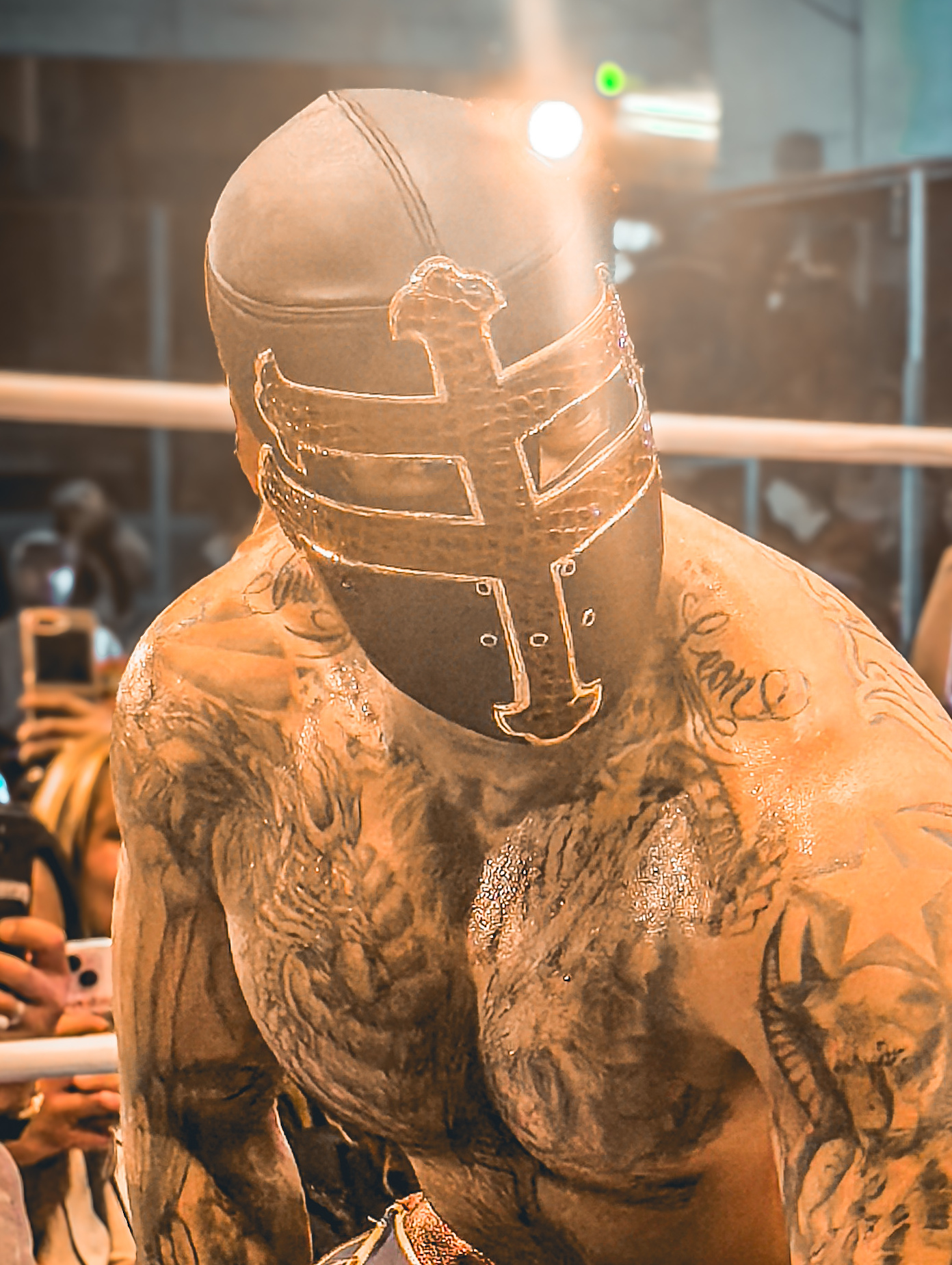
Templario

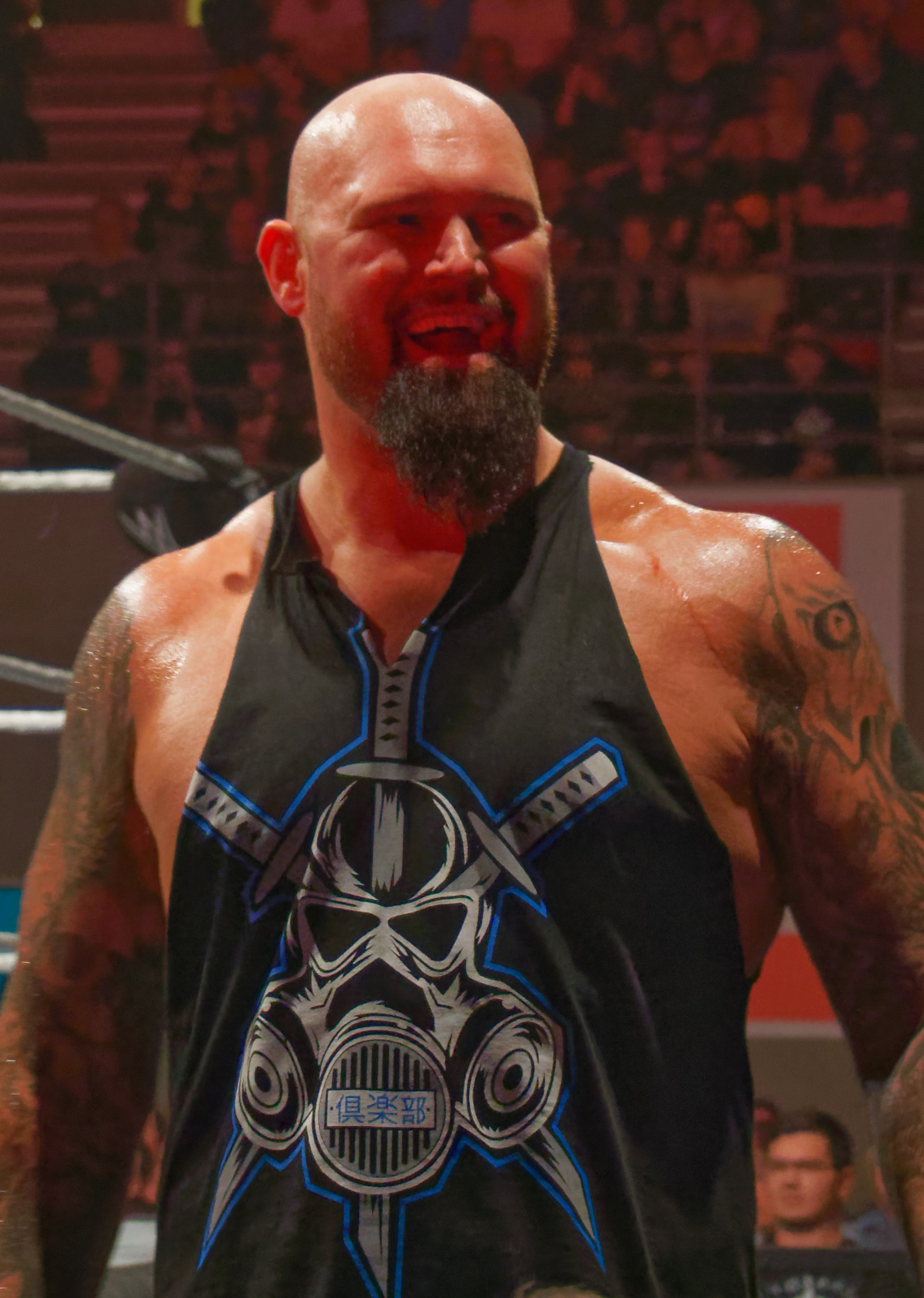
Doc Gallows

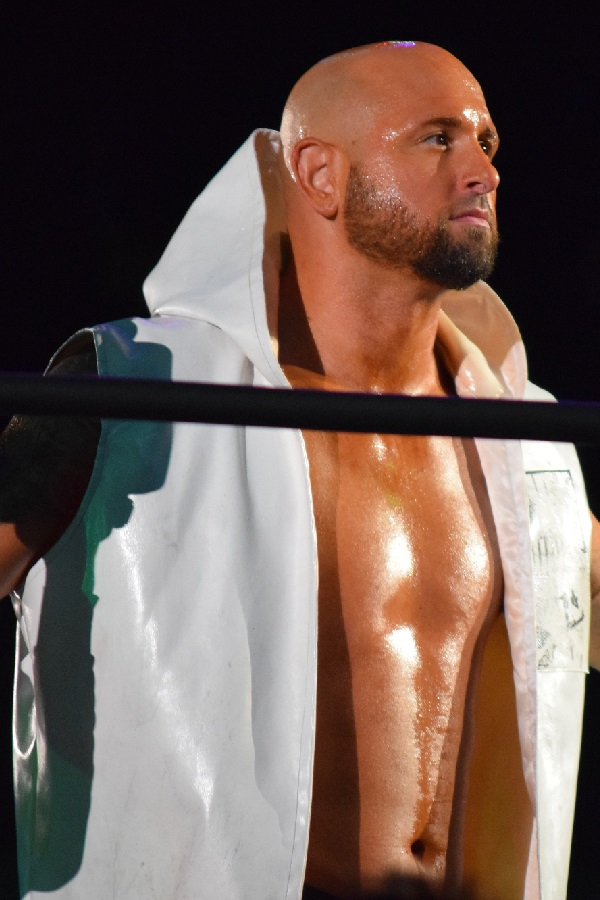
Karl Anderson

==== Men's division ====
Ring name	Real name	Notes
Andrew Everett	Drew Wenkel	
Austin Aries	Daniel Solwold Jr.	Opera Cup holder
Beastman	George Fetty	
Big Damo	Damian Mackle	
Black Tiger	Unknown	Signed to Consejo Mundial de Lucha Libre
Brick Savage	Unknown	
CJ Gallows	CJ Hankinson	
Diego Hill	Diego Hill	
Doc Gallows	Andrew Hankinson	World Tag Team Champion
Don Gato	Unknown	
Ikuro Kwon	Tristen Thai	
Jesus Rodriguez	Jesus Rodriguez	
Joe Coffey	Joe Coffey	
Josh Bishop	Joshua Bishop	Freelancer; World Heavyweight Champion
Jumbo	Unknown	
Karl Anderson	Chad Allegra	World Tag Team Champion
Killer Kross	Kevin Kesar	Freelancer
LaBron Kozone	LaBron Kozone	Southern Crown Champion
Mark Coffey	Mark Coffey	
Matt Riddle	Matthew Riddle	National Openweight Champion
Místico	Luis Urive Alvirde	Signed to All Elite Wrestling and Consejo Mundial de Lucha Libre
Okumura	Shigeo Okumura	Signed to Consejo Mundial de Lucha Libre
Templario	Unknown	World Middleweight Champion; Signed to Consejo Mundial de Lucha Libre
Titán	Unknown	Signed to Consejo Mundial de Lucha Libre
Trevor Lee	Trevor Caddell	
Último Guerrero	José Gutiérrez Hernández	Signed to Consejo Mundial de Lucha Libre
Wolfgang	Barry Young	

==== Women's division ====
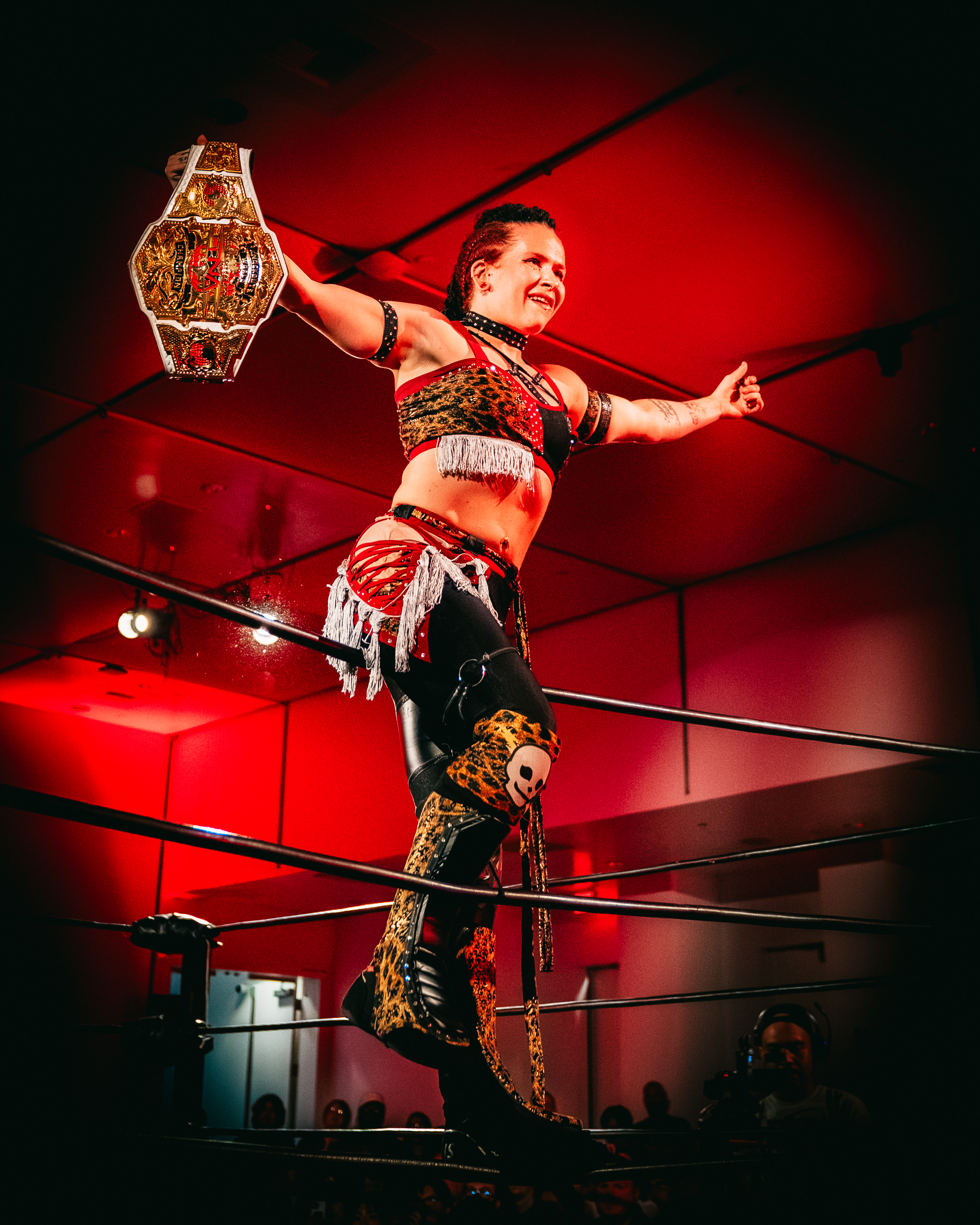
Masha

Ring name	Real name	Notes
Masha	Anna Kozina	World Women's Featherweight Champion
Scarlett Bordeaux	Elizabeth Chihaia-Kesar	
Tessa Blanchard	Tessa Blanchard	Signed to Consejo Mundial de Lucha Libre
Zamaya	Unknown	

=== Other on-air personnel ===
Ring name	Real name	Notes
Cesar Duran	Luis Fernandez-Gil	President
Joe Dombrowski	Joe Dombrowski	Play-by-play commentator
Josef Samael	Joseph Cabibbo	Head of Talent Relations; Manager of Contra Unit
Kimchee	Steven Lombardi	Manager of Beastman; Occasional wrestler
Lissy Almeida	Lissy Almeida	Ring announcer
Rich Bocchini	Rich Bocchini	Broadcaster ("MLW Insider"); Assistant Head of Talent Relations
Salina de la Renta	Natalia Class	Vice President of Wrestler Relations; Creative Director of the Women’s Division
"Filthy" Tom Lawlor	Tom Lawlor	Color commentator

== Backstage personnel ==
Ring name	Real name	Notes
Alex Greenfield	Alex Greenfield	Producer; Creative staff
Court Bauer	Court Bauer	Founder and owner CEO; President; Executive Producer; Head of Creative
Nick Bonnano	Nick Bonnano	Producer; Creative staff
