= Fightland (2023) =

2023 Major League Wrestling event

- Promotional poster of the event
- Promotion: Major League Wrestling
- Date: November 18, 2023
- City: Philadelphia, Pennsylvania
- Venue: 2300 Arena
- Attendance: 1,100-1,300

Event chronology
← Previous; Slaughterhouse	Next → One Shot

Fightland chronology
← Previous; 2022	Next → 2024

Fightland (2023) was a professional wrestling event produced by Major League Wrestling (MLW). It took place on November 18, 2023, at the 2300 Arena in Philadelphia, Pennsylvania, and was the fifth event under the Fightland chronology. The event streamed live on FITE, with additional matches taped for future episodes of MLW Fusion.

== Production ==
=== Background ===
Other on-screen personnel
Role:	Name:
Commentators	Joe Dombrowski
Commentators	Matt Striker
Commentators	Mr. Thomas

MLW Fightland was first held in 2018 as a television taping for MLW's weekly program, MLW Fusion. On May 2, 2023, a new partnership between MLW and FITE was announced, in which the promotion would produce live events for FITE+ subscribers. MLW would subsequently announce four upcoming FITE+ specials on July 8, 2023, with Fightland announced to be taking place on November 18, at the 2300 Arena in Philadelphia, Pennsylvania; making it the first edition to air live.

=== Storylines ===
The card will consist of matches that result from scripted storylines, where wrestlers portray villains, heroes, or less distinguishable characters in scripted events that built tension and culminate in a wrestling match or series of matches, with results predetermined by MLW's writers. Storylines are played out on MLW Fusion, and the league's social media platforms.

On the October 26 episode of Fusion, Salina de la Renta, who served as executive producer of the show that night, announced that Alex Kane will defend the MLW World Heavyweight Championship against Jacob Fatu. Additionally, she also announced a "Lucha Rules" tag team match in conjunction with Consejo Mundial de Lucha Libre (CMLL), where MLW World Middleweight Champion Rocky Romero will team with Bárbaro Cavernario to face potential middleweight contender Ichiban and Máscara Dorada.

For the past several months, The Second Gear Crew (Mance Warner, Matthew Justice, and 1 Called Manders) have been feuding with Mister Saint Laurent's World Titan Federation, ever since MSL betrayed his former client Microman and aligned with Davey Boy Smith Jr.. At Fury Road, Warner faced MSL's newest client Matt Cardona in a No Holds Barred Kiss My Foot match in a losing effort. He was then forced to kiss MSL's foot rather than Cardona's, but instead bit the foot of MSL in retaliation. On November 1, MLW announced a rematch between Warner and Cardona, this time in a Loser Leaves MLW match.

The World Titan Federation also recently began a feud with Alex Kane's Bomaye Fight Club, stemming from Slaughterhouse where Matt Cardona interrupted Kane after he had retained over Tom Lawlor (a substitute for Davey Boy Smith Jr. who was pulled from the show for emergency surgery). Lawlor then attacked Kane and his BFC teammates Mr. Thomas and O'Shay Edwards, before confirming his alignment with the WTF. On October 31, MLW announced a tag team match for the Fusion taping, where Thomas and Edwards will face Lawlor and a new mystery member of the WTF.

In the ongoing feud between the Second Gear Crew and The Calling, The SGC's Matthew Justice and 1 Called Manders challenged The Calling's Akira and Rickey Shane Page for the MLW World Tag Team Championship in a tables match. The match ended in a no contest when Justice and Akira went through a stack of tables at the same time. The two teams continued to brawl afterward, with Mance Warner and the rest of The Calling joining in. The SGC would challenge The Calling to a ladder match for the titles at Fightland, which was accepted and made official by MLW on November 6.

== Results ==
No.	Results	Stipulations	Times
1^{FT}	Wasted Youth (Dylan McKay and Marcus Mathers) defeated Lucky 13 and Austin Luke, and The Mane Event (Jay Lyon and Midas Black)	Three-way tag team match	5:01
2^{FT}	Zayda Steel defeated Gia Scott	Singles match	3:31
3^{FT}	Tony Deppen (with The Dirty Ass Bastards (TJ Crawford and Griffin McCoy)) defeated Nolo Kitano	Singles match	5:51
4^{FT}	Jimmy Lloyd defeated Talon	Thumbtacks Pit of Deathmatch	7:28
5^{FT}	Kevin Blackwood defeated TJ Crawford (with Griffin McCoy)	Singles match	3:27
6^{FT}	Josh Bishop won by last eliminating Matthew Justice (Note: Other participants in the match: Brett Ryan Gosselin, Griffin McCoy, Ichiban, Kevin Blackwood, Love, Doug, Good Brother #3, Mr. Thomas, Nolo Kitano, O'Shay Edwards, TJ Crawford, Tom Lawlor, Tony Deppen, and Yoscifer El.)	Battle royal	11:01
7^{FT}	Janai Kai (c) (with Salina de la Renta) defeated Tiara James and Delmi Exo	Three-way match for the MLW World Women's Featherweight Championship	4:58
8^{FT}	Rickey Shane Page (c) defeated Akira	Singles match for the MLW National Openweight Championship	4:22
9^{FT}	World Titan Federation (Alexander Hammerstone, Josh Bishop and Tom Lawlor) (with Mister Saint Laurent) defeated The Bomaye Fight Club (J Boujii, Mr. Thomas and O'Shay Edwards) (with Alex Kane)	Six-man tag team match	8:00
10	The Second Gear Crew (Matthew Justice and 1 Called Manders) defeated The Calling (Akira and Rickey Shane Page) (c)	Ladder match for the MLW World Tag Team Championship	12:20
11	Matt Cardona (with Mister Saint Laurent) defeated Mance Warner by pinfall	Loser Leaves MLW match	8:09
12	Ichiban and Máscara Dorada defeated Bárbaro Cavernario and Rocky Romero (with Salina de la Renta) by pinfall	Lucha Rules tag team match	11:56
13	Alex Kane (c) (with Mr. Thomas) defeated Jacob Fatu by submission	Singles match for the MLW World Heavyweight Championship	48:00
(c) / – the champion(s) heading into the match; FT / – the match was taped for a future broadcast of Fusion
