= Daniel Vidot =

Australian wrestler, Samoa & US international rugby league footballer (born 1990)

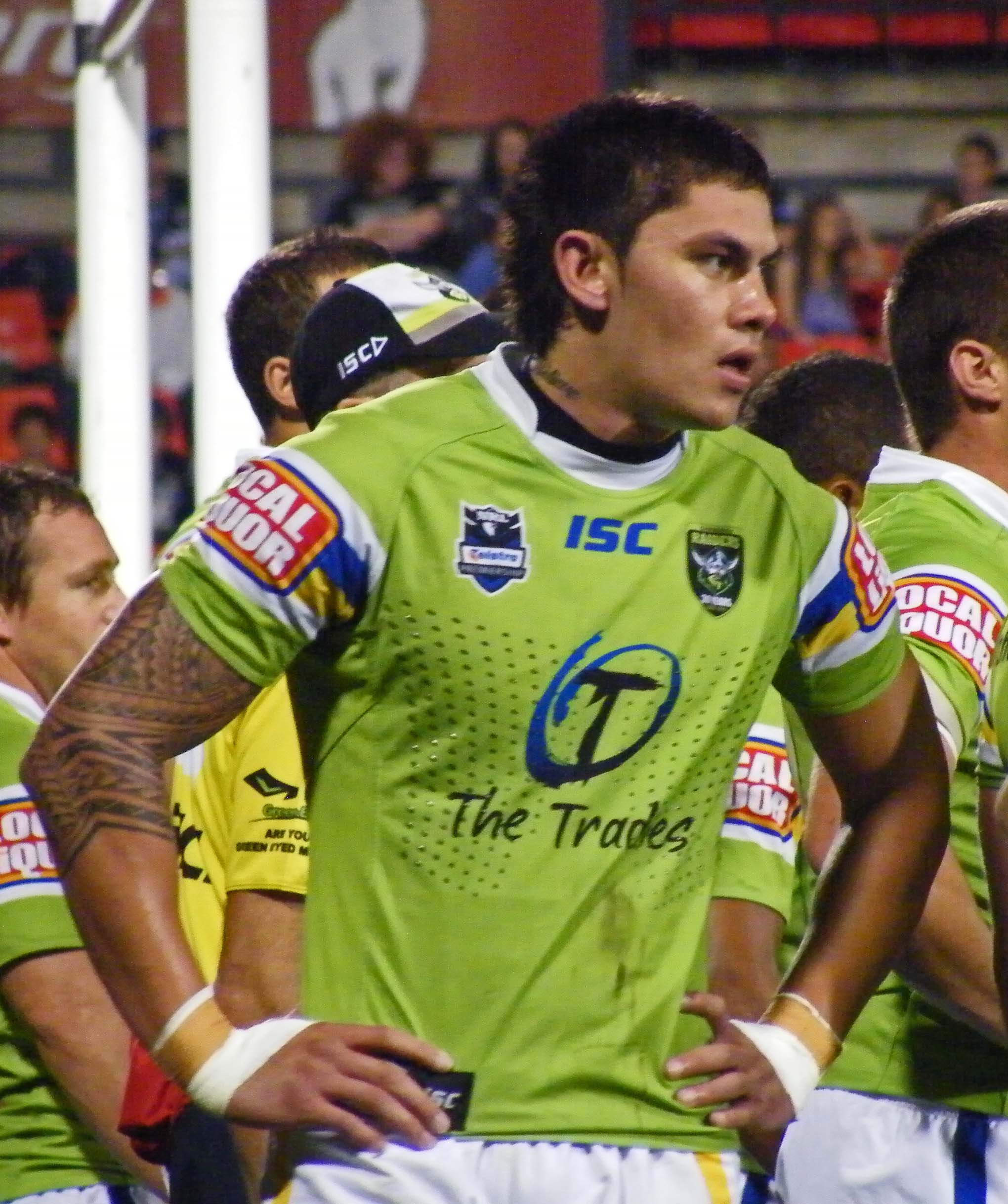
- Vidot in 2009
- Born: Daniel Sean Vidot; 8 February 1990 (age 36); Brisbane, Queensland, Australia
- Professional wrestling career
- Ring names: Daniel Vidot; Ghost Vin Quade; Xyon Quinn; Xyon
- Billed height: 6 ft 2 in (1.88 m)
- Billed weight: 246 lb (112 kg)
- Trained by: WWE Performance Center; Chris Hero
- Debut: 29 November 2018
- Rugby league career

Personal information
- Height: 188 cm (6 ft 2 in)
- Weight: 112 kg (247 lb; 17 st 9 lb)

Playing information
- Position: Wing
Club
Years	Team	Pld	T	G	FG	P
2009–11	Canberra Raiders	45	27	0	0	108
2012–13	St. George Illawarra Dragons	35	14	0	0	56
2014–15	Brisbane Broncos	31	12	0	0	48
2016	Salford Red Devils	10	6	0	0	24
2017	Gold Coast Titans	3	2	0	0	8
2024	DC Cavalry	1	4	0	0	0
	Total	125	65	0	0	244
Representative
Years	Team	Pld	T	G	FG	P
2013–15	Samoa	10	6	0	0	24
2024–26	United States	4	5	0	0	20
- Source: As of 20 November 2026

Daniel Sean Vidot (/vɪdoʊ/; born 8 February 1990) is an Australian-born professional wrestler and rugby league footballer of Samoan descent. He is currently performing on the All Japan Pro Wrestling under the ring name Xyon, where he is a former World Tag Team Champion alongside Oddyssey as part of the HAVOC stable. He is best known for his tenure in WWE, where he performed under the ring name Xyon Quinn. Born in Australia, he played for the Samoa national rugby league team.

During his time in rugby league, he previously played as a winger in the NRL for the Canberra Raiders, St. George Illawarra Dragons, Brisbane Broncos and the Gold Coast Titans. He also played for the Salford Red Devils in the Super League, and represented Samoa and now the USA at international level, where he often plays as a second-row.

== Early life ==
Born in Brisbane, Queensland, Vidot is of Samoan and Irish descent.

Vidot played his junior football at Souths Acacia Ridge, and attended Sunnybank State High School and St Thomas More College, Sunnybank before being signed the Canberra Raiders. In 2007, Vidot played the Queensland Under 17's team. Vidot played for the Canberra Raiders NYC team in 2008–2009 including playing in the Raiders team at centre that won the 2008 inaugural Toyota Cup Grand Final against the Brisbane Broncos NYC team 28–24.

== Rugby league career ==
=== 2009 ===
In Round 18 of the 2009 NRL season, Vidot was called on to make his first grade NRL debut for the Canberra Raiders against the Newcastle Knights on the wing in the Raiders 23–4 loss at Hunter Stadium. In Round 18 against the Penrith Panthers, Vidot scored his first NRL career try in the Raiders 27–14 loss at Penrith Stadium. In Round 25 against the Newcastle Knights at Canberra Stadium, Vidot was sin binned during the match after being in a fight with the Knight's Ben Rogers, the Raiders won the game 30–14 and Vidot scored a try. Vidot finished his debut year in the NRL with him playing in 8 matches and scoring 6 tries for the Raiders in the 2009 NRL season.

=== 2010 ===
Vidot finished the 2010 NRL season as the Raiders highest try scorer with 16 tries in 25 matches. Vidot was selected in the Samoan train on squad in 2010 to play New Zealand but withdrew so he would remain eligible to play for Queensland.

=== 2011 ===
On 30 August 2011, Vidot signed with the St George Illawarra Dragons starting in the 2012 season on a 3-year deal after falling out of favour with the Raiders spending most of the year in the Queensland Cup playing for the Souths Logan Magpies. Vidot finished the 2011 NRL season with him playing in 12 matches and scoring 5 tries for the Raiders.

=== 2012 ===
In Round 3 of the 2012 NRL season, Vidot made his club debut for the St George Illawarra Dragons against the Wests Tigers on the wing, scoring a try in the Dragons 36–12 win at Jubilee Oval. Vidot finished the year with him playing in 20 matches and scoring 5 tries for the Dragons.

=== 2013 ===
On 20 April 2013, Vidot played in the 2013 Polynesian Cup against Tonga, scoring the Samoan's only try in the 36–4 defeat at Penrith Stadium. Vidot played in 15 matches scored 9 tries for the Dragons in the 2013 NRL season. On 15 October, Daniel Vidot signed a 2-year deal with the Brisbane Broncos. Vidot appeared in all four of Samoa's World Cup games and scored one try against France in their 22–6 win at Stade Gilbert Brutus.

=== 2014 ===
In Round 1 of the season, Vidot made his club debut for the Brisbane Broncos against the Canterbury-Bankstown Bulldogs on the wing, scoring a try in the Broncos 18–12 win at ANZ Stadium. On 3 May 2014, Vidot was selected to play for Samoa in the 2014 Pacific Test against Fiji on the wing and scored a try in the 32–16 win at Penrith Stadium. On 18 July 2014, Vidot was demoted to the Queensland Cup along with Jack Reed and Corey Oates after they breached the club mid-week anti-alcohol policies, missing the Broncos match against the New Zealand Warriors at Suncorp Stadium. Vidot late returned for the Broncos in Round 21 against the Manly-Warringah Sea Eagles in the Broncos 16–4 loss at Brookvale Oval. In Round 24 against the Newcastle Knights, Vidot played his 100th NRL career match, scoring a try in the Broncos 48–6 win at Suncorp Stadium. Vidot finished off his first season with the Broncos with him playing in 23 matches and scoring 8 tries.

Vidot played in all of Samoa's 3 matches in the 2014 Four Nations series, scoring 1 try.

=== 2015 ===
Vidot started the 2015 NRL season in the Queensland Cup playing for the Ipswich Jets at prop when coach Wayne Bennett axed him due to his error riddled World Cup Series match against Wigan. On 25 March 2015, Vidot was granted compassionate leave from his Broncos contract after a deal with the South Sydney Rabbitohs fell through. Vidot later earned his recall to Broncos NRL team in Round 5 against the Gold Coast Titans in the Broncos 26–16 win at Robina Stadium. On 2 May 2015, Vidot played for Samoa against Tonga in the 2015 Polynesian Cup, playing on the wing and scored a try in Samoa's 18–16 win at Cbus Super Stadium. Vidot finished the 2015 NRL season with him playing in 8 matches and scoring 4 tries for the Broncos.

=== 2016 ===
On 11 November 2015, it was announced that Vidot had signed a 2-year contract with English Super League club, the Salford Red Devils, starting in 2016. Injuries prevented Vidot from making an immediate impact with the Red Devils, and he subsequently made his debut for Salford on 7 May in the Challenge Cup on the wing. However, he failed to score a try in the 32–18 loss. Vidot scored his first two tries for the Red Devils in an 18–12 victory over the Widnes Vikings in Round 15 of the regular season.

In addition to his move to the Super League, Vidot took part in a trial for WWE, as he got the attention of wrestling talent scouts from the US because of his size, acting background, and perceived status as an elite athlete. He revealed in an interview that he initially received an offer for a trial from the company in 2015, but turned it down due to good form with the Broncos. He also stated he was a wrestling fan growing up, and would often imitate The Undertaker.

Vidot ended his debut year in the Super League playing in 10 matches, and scoring 6 tries for Salford. At the end of the season, Vidot was released from his contract with Salford on compassionate grounds, citing a desire to return to Australia.

=== 2017 ===
It was announced in late 2016 that the Gold Coast Titans were interested in bringing Vidot back to the NRL. Vidot signed a one-year deal with the Titans, and was named in their Auckland Nines squad. Vidot played out the Titans 30–18 victory over the Parramatta Eels in the Alice Springs pre-season trial match, and made his club debut in Round 4, scoring a try in the 32–26 defeat against the North Queensland Cowboys. As the Titans favoured using Dale Copley and Anthony Don on the wings, Vidot was mainly relegated to the Burleigh Bears, the Titans' affiliate club in the Queensland Cup competition. Vidot appeared for the Titans in three games in 2017, scoring two tries, before retiring from rugby league at the end of the season to pursue a professional wrestling career with WWE.

=== 2024 ===
On 5 Nov 2024 it was reported that he has been included in the United States squad for the forthcoming tour of South Africa after turning out for DC Cavalry in the USARL.

=== 2025 ===
On 28 February 2025 he played for the United States in a 46-10 loss to Greece.

=== 2026 ===
On 27 February 2026 it was reported that he has been included in the United States squad for the forthcoming fixture against Scotland in Las Vegas.

Vidot started at second-row, where he scored a try in the 37th minute of the match, in a 28-20 victory for the USA over Scotland.

== Professional wrestling career ==
=== WWE (2018–2024) ===
==== NXT (2018–2023) ====
In May 2018, Vidot signed a developmental contract with WWE.

On 20 October 2020, Vidot's ring name Xyon Quinn was trademarked by WWE. He debuted on NXT on 24 August 2021 in an upset victory over Boa. On 3 September, Quinn defeated Andre Chase in his 205 Live debut

On 9 November episode of NXT, he garnered the attention of Elektra Lopez and Legado Del Fantasma, leading into a feud with the group's leader, Santos Escobar. Quinn was defeated by Escobar on the 7 December edition of NXT, before the feud ended on 12 January, with Quinn once again failing to defeat Escobar. On 10 May 2022 episode of NXT, Quinn turned heel after confronting and attacking Nathan Frazer. Quinn found little success as a heel, losing feuds to Wes Lee and Quincy Elliot. On 23 March 2023 episode of NXT, Quinn made his final appearance in NXT, competed in a 20-man battle royal to claim a spot in the fatal-five-way NXT North American Championship match at Stand & Deliver, being eliminated by Oro Mensah.

==== Main roster (2023–2024) ====
On 24 April 2020, Vidot made his on screen debut on an episode of SmackDown losing to Sheamus. Quinn also wrestled a dark match in July 2021 on Smackdown.

In the WWE Draft in April 2023, Quinn was revealed as a free agent. Quinn only made two appearances on the main roster in 2023 and 2024; competing in a 20-man Battle Royal to determine the number one contender for the WWE Intercontinental Championship on an episode of Raw and losing to Bron Breakker in six seconds on Smackdown. On 19 April, Quinn was released from WWE, ending his 6 year stint with the promotion.

=== Total Nonstop Action Wrestling (2024) ===
On 9 August 2024, Vidot made his debut in Total Nonstop Action Wrestling (TNA) under the ring name Xyon, facing Steve Maclin at Xplosion in a losing effort. He returned on 23 August episode of Xplosion, losing to Sami Callihan.

=== All Japan Pro Wrestling (2025–present) ===
On 9 February 2025, Xyon was announced as one of the competitors for All Japan Pro Wrestling's Champion Carnival. In August, he formed a stable, "HAVOC", with Oddyssey and Shotaro Ashino. On 23 September, at Giant Dream 2025, Xyon and Oddyssey defeated Baka No Jidai (Hideki Suzuki and Kengo Mashimo) to win the World Tag Team Championship, making it the first title in Xyon's career. Xyon and Odyssey competed in the 2025 World's Strongest Tag Determination League in November to December 2025, placing top of block B with 10 points, but losing to the Titans of Calamity (Ren Ayabe and Talos) in the finals in Tokyo's Korakuen Hall.

On January 2, 2026, in Korakuen Hall, Oddyssey and Xyon lost the AJPW World Tag Team Championship to the Titans of Calamity. Throughout early 2026, HAVOC faced tag teams and stables including Baka No Jidai, Hokuto-gun, and the Saito Brothers.

== Personal life ==
In August 2018, Vidot proposed to fellow wrestler Danielle Glanville, better known as Harley Cameron, during their last night in Australia before migrating to America. The couple split in 2024.

== Championships and accomplishments ==
- All Japan Pro Wrestling
  - World Tag Team Championship (1 time) – with Odyssey
- Impact Pro Wrestling
  - IPW Tag Team Championship (1 time, current) – with Toa
