= Odyssey Jones =

American professional wrestler (born 1994)

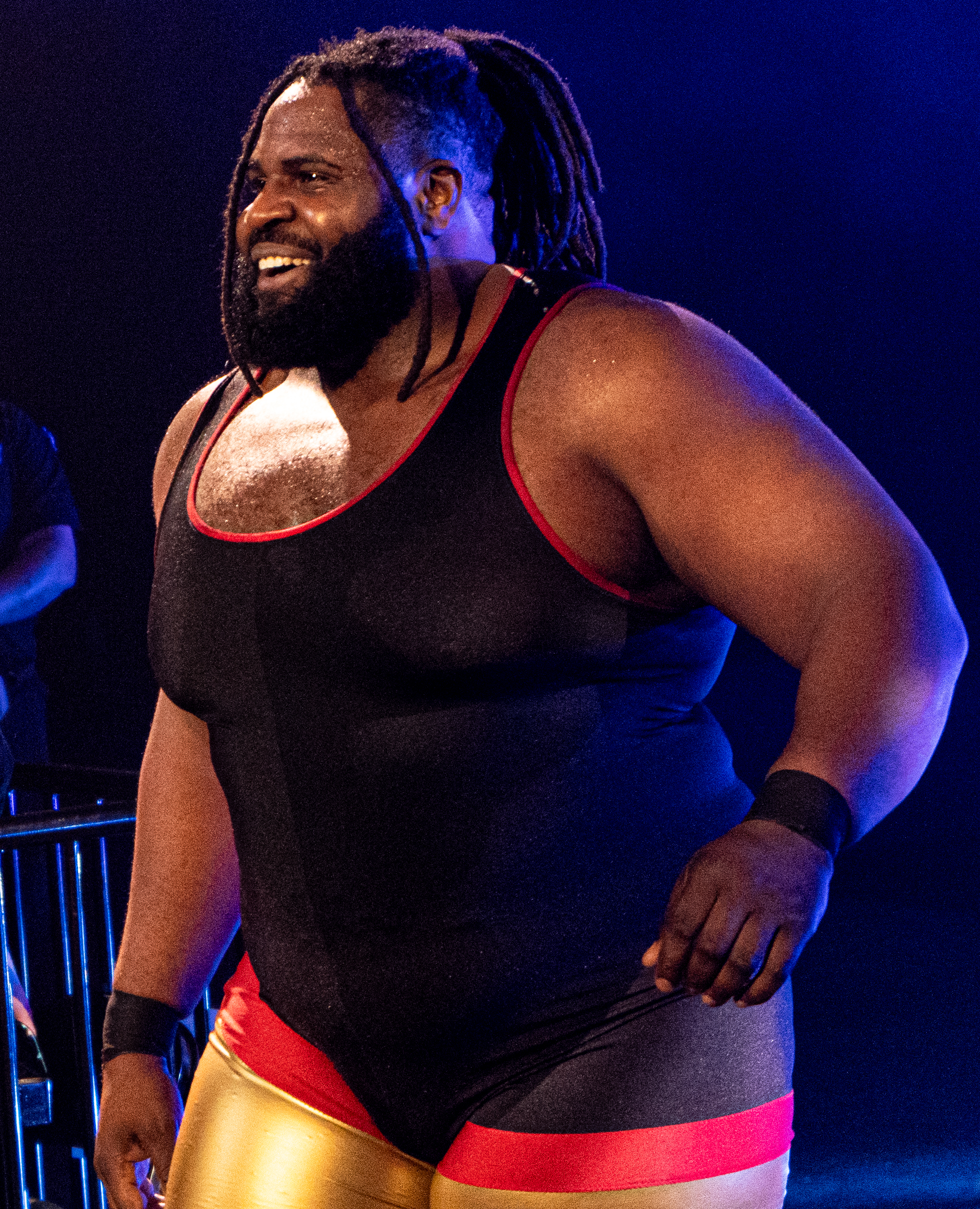
- Jones in 2024

Personal information
- Born: Omari Jahi Palmer; May 17, 1994 (age 32) Brooklyn, New York, U.S.
- Education: Syracuse University

Professional wrestling career
- Ring name(s): Oddyssey; Odyssey Jones; Omari Palmer
- Billed height: 6 ft 5 in (196 cm)
- Billed weight: 405 lb (184 kg)
- Trained by: WWE Performance Center
- Debut: November 7, 2019

Omari Jahi Palmer (born May 17, 1994) is an American professional wrestler. He is primarily performing for All Japan Pro Wrestling under the ring name Oddyssey, where he is the Gaora TV Champion, a former World Tag Team Champion, and a member of the HAVOC stable alongside Shotaro Ashino and Xyon. He is also known for his time in WWE, where he performed under the ring name Odyssey Jones.

== Early life ==
Palmer was born in Brooklyn, New York and grew up in Coram, New York. He attended Longwood High School, where he competed in football, basketball, lacrosse, and wrestling. In 2012, Palmer attended Syracuse University, majoring in sociology. He joined the roster of the Syracuse Orange football team, playing 36 games for the team as an offensive guard until suffering a lower leg injury during his senior year in 2016.

== Professional wrestling career ==
=== WWE (2019–2024) ===
In June 2018, Palmer attended a try-out with the professional wrestling promotion WWE. In February 2019, he was hired by WWE and assigned to the WWE Performance Center in Orlando, Florida for training. In May 2019, Palmer set an 800 lb (363 kg) trap bar deadlift record at the WWE Performance Center Combine, beating the previous record of 775 lb (352 kg) held by Otis. He wrestled his first match on November 7, 2019, losing to Dexter Lumis at a house show in Ocala, Florida under his birth name. He wrestled a handful of matches in late-2019 and early-2020 before going on hiatus for over a year.

Palmer returned to the ring in July 2021 under the new ring name of "Odyssey Jones", wrestling dark matches at WWE SmackDown tapings. He wrestled his first televised match on the July 6 episode of WWE 205 Live, defeating Grayson Waller. On July 20, he wrestled his first televised WWE NXT match, defeating Andre Chase in the first round of the WWE NXT Breakout Tournament. He defeated Trey Baxter in the semi-finals before losing to Carmelo Hayes in the finals. Jones then spent the rest of the year on NXT engaging in feuds with heels such as Andre Chase and the Diamond Mine. In January 2022, Palmer ruptured his patellar tendon during a match with Saurav Gurjar; he underwent surgery later that month.

Jones returned on the October 25, 2022 show of NXT, inviting Edris Enofé and Malik Blade to a party. The next week, he made his in-ring return defeating Javier Bernal. In the 2023 WWE Draft, Jones was drafted to the Raw brand. In September 2023, he took part in the Superstar Spectacle in Hyderabad, India, losing to Bron Breakker. In the 2024 WWE Draft in April, Jones was once again drafted to the Raw brand; he debuted in August 2024, starting a program with The New Day.

In September 2024, after allegations of domestic abuse were made against him, Jones was abruptly removed from WWE television and subsequently fired by WWE. In January 2025, Palmer stated that he was accepting bookings; in February 2025, he began wrestling on the independent circuit under the ring name "Oddyssey".

=== All Japan Pro Wrestling (2025–present) ===
In August 2025, Oddyssey made his debut for All Japan Pro Wrestling (AJPW) as a participant in the 2025 Ōdō Tournament. Upon debuting, he formed a stable, "HAVOC", with Shotaro Ashino and Xyon. He defeated Hideki Suzuki in the first round of the Ōdō Tournament but lost to Daisuke Sekimoto in the second round.

In September 2025 at AJPW's "Giant Dream" event, Oddyssey and Xyon defeated Baka No Jidai (Hideki Suzuki and Kengo Mashimo) in the Arena Tachikawa Tachihi for the AJPW World Tag Team Championship, making it the first title in Oddyssey's career. In October 2025, Go Shiozaki joined HAVOC. Oddyssey and Xyon competed in the 2025 World's Strongest Tag Determination League in November to December 2025, placing top of block B with 10 points, but losing to the Titans of Calamity (Ren Ayabe and Talos) in the finals in Tokyo's Korakuen Hall. On January 2, 2026, in Korakuen Hall, Oddyssey and Xyon lost the AJPW World Tag Team Championship to the Titans of Calamity.

Throughout early 2026, HAVOC faced tag teams and stables including Baka No Jidai, Hokuto-gun, and the Saito Brothers. In April to May 2026, Oddyssey competed in the Champion Carnival, finishing sixth of eight competitors in block B with six points. In May 2026, Go Shiozaki left HAVOC. In September 2026, Odyssey entered the 2026 Ōdō Tournament, being eliminated by his stablemate Xyon in the first round. On November 3, 2026, Oddyssey defeated Masaaki Mochizuki in Sapporo to win the Gaora TV Championship. In the same month, Oddyssey and Xyon entered the 2026 World's Strongest Tag Determination League.

=== Major League Wrestling (2026) ===
In June 2026, Oddyssey debuted in Major League Wrestling (MLW). He competed in the Opera Cup, but was eliminated by Big Damo.

== Professional wrestling style and persona ==
Jones wrestles in a "powerhouse" style. His finishing moves include a sidewalk slam, a falling powerslam and a diving splash. While in WWE, he wore orange and blue ring attire (a reference to the Syracuse Orange colors) and was nicknamed "the Future Favorite".

== Personal life ==
In September 2024, Palmer was the subject of allegations of domestic abuse from his former partner, which led to him being released from WWE. In January 2025, Palmer stated that he was innocent, and that he had an injunction in place and was pursuing legal action against his accuser. In March 2025, Palmer filed a defamation lawsuit against his former partner. In September 2025, it was reported that Palmer's legal team had subpoenaed WWE seeking Palmer's termination records, the evidence for the allegations made against him, and the files related to WWE's investigation.

== Championships and accomplishments ==
- All Japan Pro Wrestling
  - Gaora TV Championship (1 time, current)
  - World Tag Team Championship (1 time) – with Xyon
- Pro Wrestling Illustrated
  - Ranked No. 344 of the top singles wrestlers in the PWI 500 in 2026
