= MLW Southern Crown Championship =

Men's professional wrestling championship

Details
- Promotion: Major League Wrestling (MLW)
- Date established: March 14, 2026
- Current champion: LaBron Kozone
- Date won: October 3, 2026
Statistics
- First champion: Trevor Lee
- Most reigns: All titleholders (1)
- Longest reign: Joe Coffey (112 days)
- Shortest reign: Trevor Lee (91 days)
- Oldest champion: Joe Coffey (38 years, 22 days)
- Youngest champion: Trevor Lee (32 years, 165 days)
- Heaviest champion: LaBron Kozone (245 lb (111 kg))
- Lightest champion: Trevor Lee (220 lb (100 kg))

The MLW Southern Crown Championship is a men's professional wrestling championship created and promoted by the American professional wrestling company Major League Wrestling (MLW). The inaugural champion is Trevor Lee. The current champion is LaBron Kozone, who is in his first reign. He won the title by defeating Joe Coffey at Slaughterhouse in Atlanta, Georgia, on October 3, 2026.

== History ==
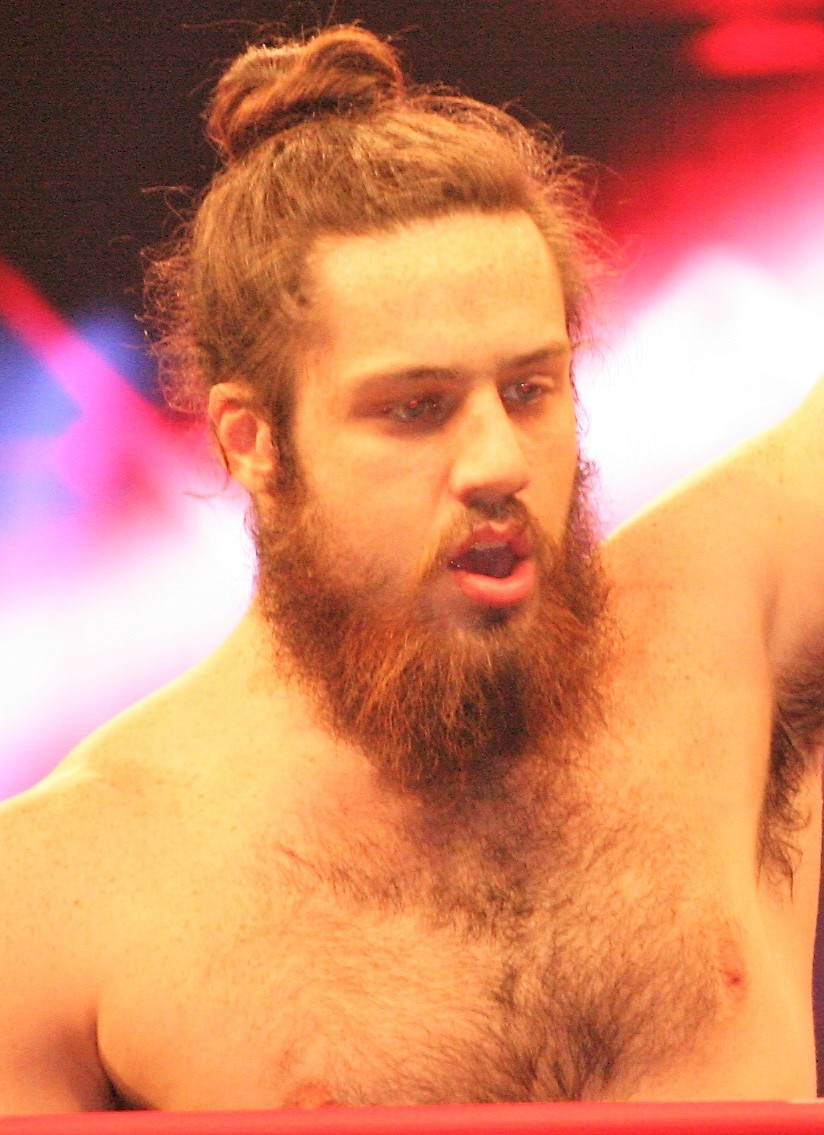
Inaugural champion Trevor Lee.

On March 14, 2026 on a episode of MLW Fusion, Trevor Lee became the inaugural MLW Southern Crown Championship by defeating Andrew Everett, Diego Hill, Festus, Ikuro Kwon, Jesús Rodriguez, Josh Bishop, Matthew Justice, Paul Walter Hauser and Beastman in a MLW Southern Crown Championship Bunkhouse Stampede match.

== Reigns ==
As of October 15, 2026.

Key
No.	Overall reign number
Reign	Reign number for the specific champion
Days	Number of days held
+	Current reign is changing daily

No.	Champion	Championship change			Reign statistics		Notes	Ref.
No.	Champion	Date	Event	Location	Reign	Days	Notes	Ref.
1	Trevor Lee	March 14, 2026	Fusion	Atlanta, Georgia	1	91	Defeated Andrew Everett, Diego Hill, Festus, Ikuro Kwon, Jesús Rodriguez, Josh Bishop, Matthew Justice, Paul Walter Hauser and Beastman in a MLW Southern Crown Championship Bunkhouse Stampede match to become the inaugural champion. Aired on tape delay on July 4, 2026.	
2	Joe Coffey	June 13, 2026	Fusion	Philadelphia, Pennsylvania	1	112		
3	LaBron Kozone	October 3, 2026	Slaughterhouse	Atlanta, Georgia	1	12+		
