= Memminger Auditorium =

Historic building in Charleston, South Carolina

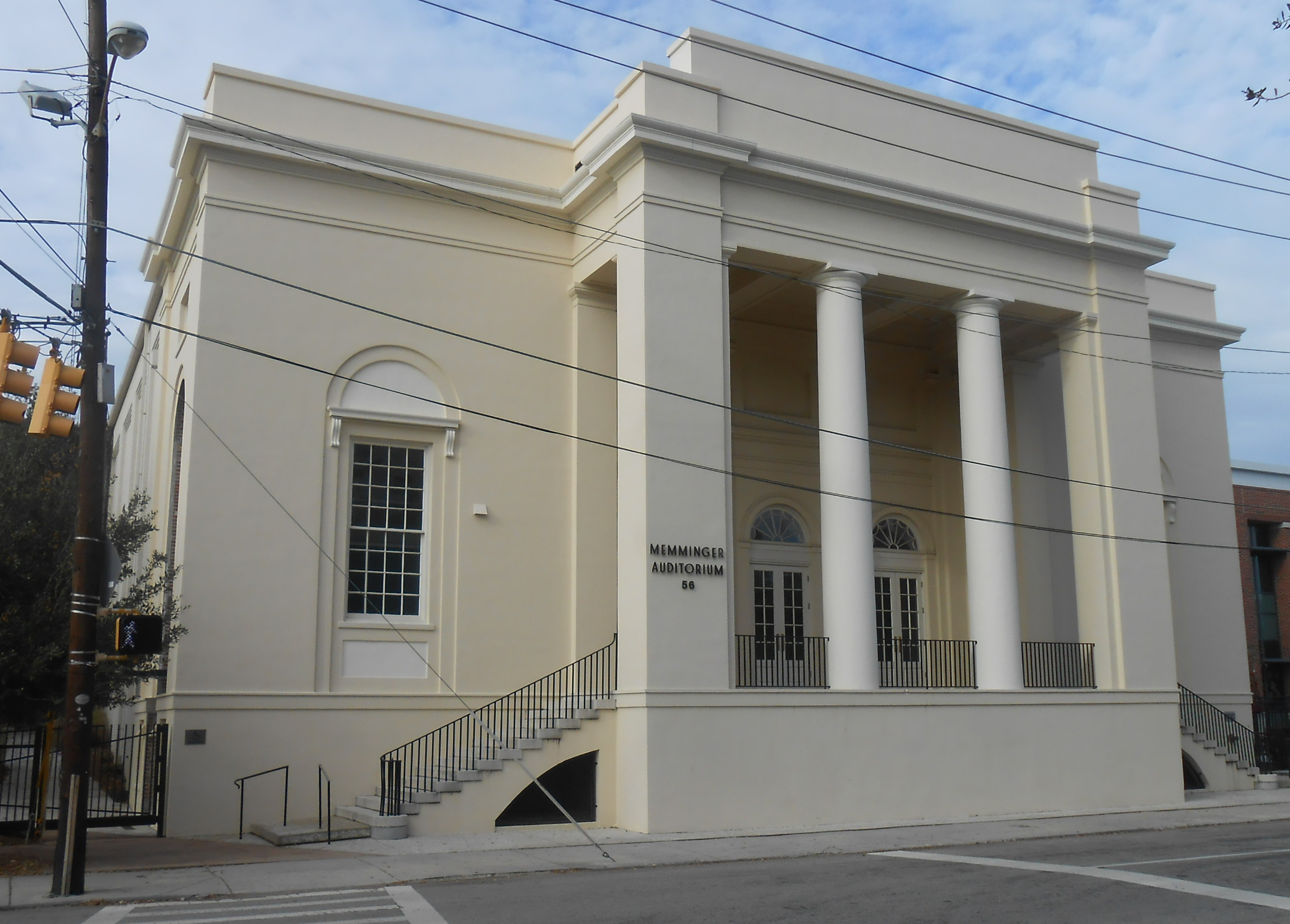
- Memminger Auditorium was built in 1939 for the adjacent school.
- Alternative names: Festival Hall

General information
- Location: 56 Beaufain St., Charleston, South Carolina, U.S.
- Coordinates: 32°46′50″N 79°56′11″W
- Groundbreaking: 1938
- Opening: September 21, 1939

Design and construction
- Architects: Simons and Lapham
- Main contractor: Artley Construction Co.

Memminger Auditorium (also known as Festival Hall) is a live performance and special events venue in Charleston, South Carolina.

== PWA funding ==
Local school officials had wanted to add an auditorium to the then-Memminger High School by the mid-1930s. During the Depression, funding was tight, and building an auditorium designed by Simons & Lapham, was expected to cost $93,000. Despite pushing the project, it was relegated to B status by the federal agency. The county joined forces with the school district to continue the push for the auditorium; not only could it be used by other schools, it could be used for desirable community center uses too.

By May 1937, funding had not been granted yet. A request to the Public Works Administration for $42,300 had been made by the city board of school commissioners for an auditorium. The PWA request included money for the future Rivers School, Memminger Auditorium, and the gym at the College of Charleston. Between the two put up by the city board of school commissioners, the auditorium was the more desirable.

In August 1937, FDR approved a PWA grant for $126,818 for a junior high school building on Race St. (The school would ultimately be the Rivers School on King St.) The school board was expected to fund the remaining $160,000. M. Rutledge Rivers, chairman of the city board of school commissioners, said that the money would be used for the new school, but only if specifically earmarked for that purpose; otherwise, “the money [would] be used for a much-needed auditorium-gymnasium building on the Memminger high school campus. That is the most pressing need right now.” When the funding was likely to include only the future junior high school or the auditorium, but not both, the mayor chose to push for the funding for the junior high school; the project would bring in more money and provide for more jobs.

Whether by squeezing more money from the PWA or by reallocating the August 1937 grant, funding was secured for the auditorium. The City Council agreed to convey land next to Memminger School. The school board approved plans by Simons & Lapham for a gymnasium-auditorium building at Memminger. The building would be a PWA project and would cost $113,000. The PWA awarded $50,850 for the auditorium project. The school board funded its 60% share of the cost with bonds. The work was done on a contract basis, which distinguished the PWA projects from WPA projects.

== School auditorium ==
The property used was already the site of large, 19th century house and other buildings, all of which were demolished for the project. In total, five buildings were wrecked for the auditorium. The construction was proceeding in January 1939 with an opening expected by June. A photo showed the building under construction in April 1939.

The new facility was set to be opened by the opening of school on September 5, 1939. The school board accepted the building, built by Artley Construction Co. of Savannah, Georgia, on August 25, 1939. It was opened for inspection by the public on September 21, 1939.

The auditorium was certainly impressive. It had the second largest stage in the South. The facility was not just an auditorium, but also a gymnasium; the stage was actually a basketball court with retractable lighting when not being used for physical activities.

The keys were handed over in a ceremony (repeated twice) on September 21, 1939. “In accepting the keys, Mr. [George C.] Rogers [the principal of Memminger High School] dedicated the auditorium to the young women of the city.” Later that month, the building got its first use when the new student body officers were sworn in there.

== Neglect and restoration ==
Despite having nearly thirty years in the spotlight as the premiere venue in Charleston, the facility became neglected after the opening of the Gailliard Center in 1968. By 1985, its windows were boarded up, and it stopped being used when Hurricane Hugo tore its roof off. The auditorium had asbestos removed and its roof repaired after Hurricane Hugo, but it was used only for storage.

However, its fortunes brightened with the rebirth of King St.; the opening the Saks on King St. prompted interest in a restoration of the facility. Nothing came of the interest in the building though until the City offered $1 million toward the restoration of the auditorium as part of a proposal to move the Academic Magnet High School to the peninsula. Eventually, City Council narrowly approved a $2.7 million plan (with $1 million for Memminger Auditorium) to restore the Murray Vocational School.

Again, progress came to a sudden halt. The school district hired LS3P as the architects for the restoration of the auditorium, and things were looking up. The school district suddenly changed course and decided to leave the Academic Magnet High School in North Charleston, and the City withdrew its commitment to a $2.7 million donation.

The future of the building looked grim, but ironically, its poor condition ended up being one of the things that saved it. The stripped out, industrial look was the perfect setting for “Surrogate Cities,” a musical composition by Heiner Goebbels, which was produced as part of Spoleto Festival USA in 2000. The large production was the first chance the public had had to visit the building in more than a decade. The concert generated talk of restoring the auditorium.

The school district considered restoring the building, but funding remained a problem (as well as inaction by the district). Mayor Joseph P. Riley offered $500,000 toward the restoration costs, but the school district never acted on it, and the City used the money elsewhere. Improvements were piecemeal. Spoleto continued using the space and installed a $60,000 air conditioning system in 2002. Each year, Spoleto performances used the space, and each year reviewers commented about how the decrepit status of the building actually contributed to whatever production was being staged.

Finally, a deal was struck in 2006 with the City leasing the building for free for 50 years if Spoleto would restore it. The City agreed to insure the building and provide parking for school workers while the restoration was done. Spoleto expected to spend about $6 million on restoring the auditorium and building and storage building and garden in the side property.

The building was under restoration for two years. Among other things, handicap access was installed during the work. The area around the building was also improved with a garden. The garden was dedicated to Countess Alicia Spaulding Paolozzi, the philanthropist and businesswoman who helped attract Spoleto Festival USA to Charleston. Huff + Gooden was the architecture firm behind the restoration. The first show in the restored building was the 2008 Spoleto production of “Amistad.”

== Naming controversy ==
Yet another instance of drama occurred on April 14, 2022, when the conservative American Heritage Association sued the city, the school district, Spoleto, and the South Carolina attorney general over the “renaming” of the building as Festival Hall. The group claimed that its traditional moniker was a tribute to Christopher Memminger, the Confederacy's Secretary of the Treasury, and that the South Carolina Heritage Act forbade “renaming” it. (The law states: “No . . . structure . . . of the State or any of its political subdivisions dedicated in memory of or named for any historic figure or historic event may be renamed or rededicated.”) The City explained that it had not renamed the hall at all since it does not even own the building. Rather, the new name had been used in marketing the spot.
