= Joe Coffey (wrestler) =

Scottish professional wrestler

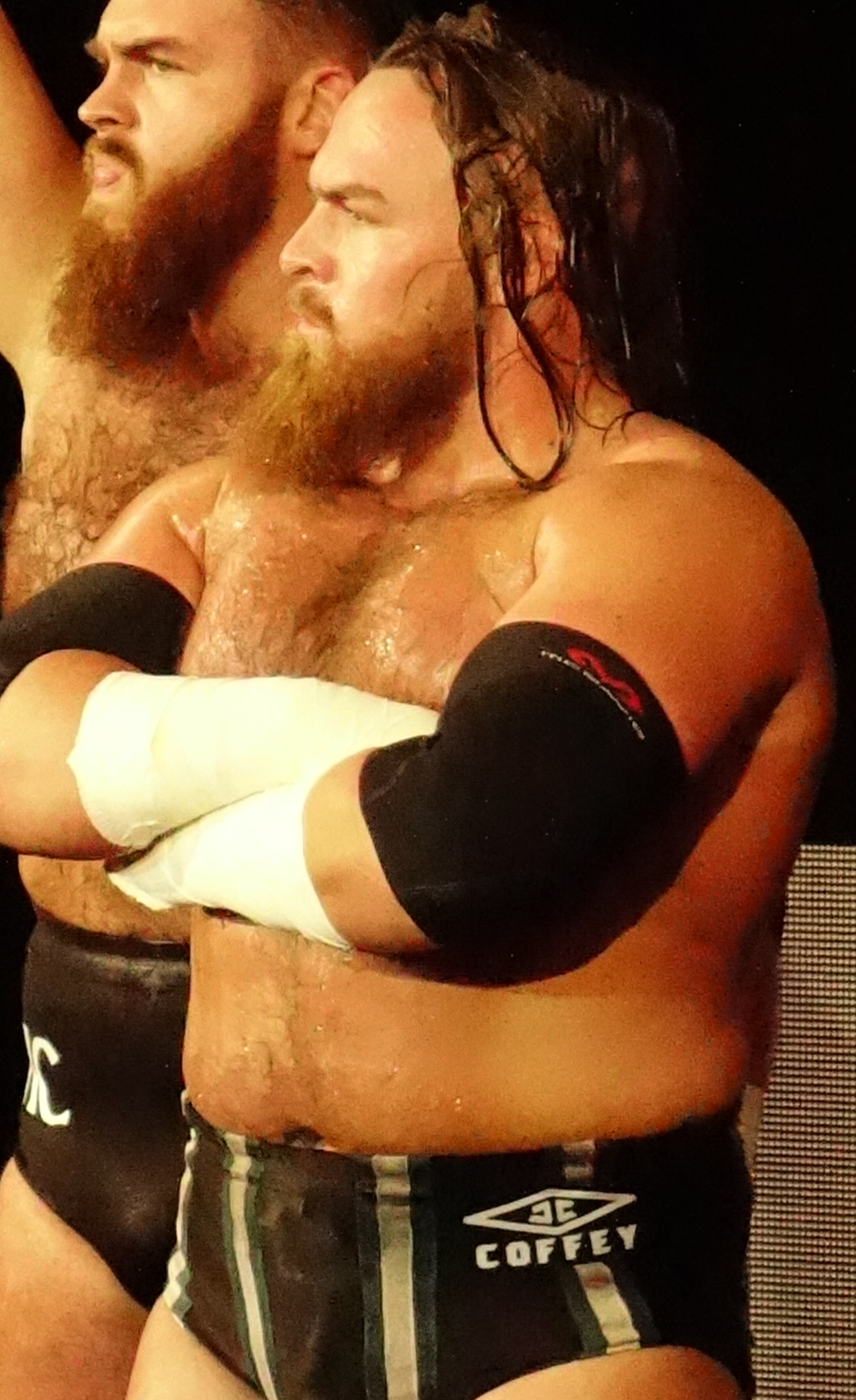
- Coffey in 2019

Personal information
- Born: Joseph Coffey; 22 May 1988 (age 38) Glasgow, Scotland
- Relative: Mark Coffey (brother)

Professional wrestling career
- Ring name: Joe Coffey
- Billed height: 5 ft 11 in (1.80 m)
- Billed weight: 242 lb (110 kg)
- Billed from: Glasgow, Scotland
- Trained by: Killian Dain; Finn Bálor; Johnny Moss
- Debut: 30 May 2009

Joseph Coffey (born 22 May 1988) is a Scottish professional wrestler. He is signed to Major League Wrestling (MLW), where he is the leader of Glasgow Boys On Top and former one-time MLW Southern Crown Champion. He also makes appearances on the British independent wrestling circuit. He is best known for his time in WWE, where he performed on the NXT brand.

Coffey is also known for his work in Insane Championship Wrestling (ICW), where he is a former two-time ICW World Heavyweight Champion and a former ICW Zero-G Champion.

== Professional wrestling career ==
=== Insane Championship Wrestling (2011–2018) ===
On 6 February 2011 Coffey made his Insane Championship Wrestling (ICW) debut at The Notorious ICW, in a match where he teamed with Rob Terry in a defeat against tezzaboi46 (lost a frame boy) and Viktor Boloshov (FBI informant). On 3 April, at Nightmare on Renfrew Street Coffey was unsuccessful at winning the ICW Zero-G Championship in a Six-Way Championship Scramble match won by Noam Dar. On 6 May 2012 at Up In Smoke! Coffey teamed with his brother Mark Coffey to defeat Andy Wild and Noam Dar in the First Round match of the ICW Tag Team Championship tournament. On 1 July at Insane In The Membrane The Coffey Brothers were defeated in the Semi Final match of the tournament.

On 31 July 2016, Coffey defeated Big Damo to win the ICW World Heavyweight Championship, only for Wolfgang to cash in his Square Go contract to win the title. On 16 April 2017 at BarraMania 3, Coffey defeated Trent Seven to become the ICW World Heavyweight Champion for the second time. After the match he aligned himself with Red Lightning after attacking Mark Dallas, turning heel in the process. At Shug's Hoose Party 4, he retained the title against Jack Jester in a steel cage match. Coffey would have a number of successful title defences of the championship over the next few months against the likes of Jack Jester, Pete Dunne, NXT's Kassius Ohno, and others. At Fear and Loathing X at the SSE Hydro, in front of ICW's biggest crowd to date Joe lost the ICW World Heavyweight Championship against BT Gunn in his second consecutive main event of that event. The following day via Twitter, Joe announced his departure from ICW after 6 years.

On 29 April 2018 at Barramania 4, Joe returned to the company and challenged brother Mark to an ICW Zero-G Championship match at Shugs Hoose Party 5, which was later rescheduled for Fear and Loathing XI due to a clash with WWE NXT UK tapings. At Fear and Loathing XI, he defeated Mark to win the championship.

=== WWE (2018–2025) ===
==== NXT UK (2018–2022) ====
Coffey's debut was made during the second night of the 2018 NXT At Download live event in Donington Park, Leicestershire, England where he eliminated Tucker in the first round of the NXT United Kingdom Championship Tournament. He advanced to the semi-finals held on the opening night of the 2018 WWE UK Championship Tournament but was eliminated by Travis Banks. Coffey joined the inaugural run of NXT UK on the October 17 episode during which he defeated Mark Andrews. On the November 7 episode of NXT UK, he reunited with his longtime tag team partner Mark Coffey and debuted in NXT UK as The Coffey Brothers.

On the January 9 episode of NXT UK, Joe and Mark Coffey debuted their new stable name Gallus after joining forces with Wolfgang. They defeated team British Strong Style in a six-man tag match during this episode. On January 12 at NXT UK TakeOver: Blackpool, Coffey had a title match for the NXT UK Championship against Pete Dunne, where he lost. After the match, Coffey was hit by a Big Boot by a debuting Walter. On the May 8 episode of NXT UK, Coffey won a title shot qualifier for the NXT UK Championship after defeating Flash Morgan Webster. He advanced to the June 5 episode of NXT UK where he competed in a Number One Contender Fatal Four Way Match against Travis Banks, Dave Mastiff, and Jordan Devlin. At NXT UK TakeOver: Blackpool II, Coffey lost a NXT UK title match against Walter.

On 30 June 2020, Coffey was suspended by WWE following sexual misconduct allegations that were made public as part of the #SpeakingOut movement. He returned to WWE later in 2020.

==== NXT (2022–2025) ====
At NXT Heatwave, Coffey and the rest of Gallus made their NXT debuts, attacking Diamond Mine. Gallus was suspended in September for attacking officials. Coffey returned at NXT Stand & Deliver, helping Gallus retain the NXT Tag Team Championship against Creed Brothers and The Family.

In April 2024, ESPN reported that Gallus help trained The Rock for his tag team match with Undisputed WWE Universal Champion Roman Reigns against Cody Rhodes and World Heavyweight Champion Seth "Freakin" Rollins at Night 1 of WrestleMania XL. On the May 14, 2024 episode of NXT, and as the show was going off the air, the cameras went backstage, showing Wes Lee, Josh Briggs and Ivar assaulted backstage. The attackers were revealed to be Gallus, making their first televised appearance on NXT since the February 13, 2024 episode of NXT. Later, NXT General Manager Ava announced that Joe would replace Ivar on the triple threat match. The following week, both Coffey and Lee pinned Briggs, and the two men were considered the winner. Later that night, NXT General Manager Ava set up a triple threat match between Coffey, Lee and Oba Femi for the NXT North American Championship, where Femi successfully retained his title on June 9 at NXT Battleground. On May 2, 2025, all members of Gallus were released from WWE.

== Personal life ==
Coffey is a supporter of Scottish football team Celtic

== Championships and accomplishments ==
- Discovery Wrestling
  - Y Division Championship (1 time)
  - Discovery Awards (4 times)
    - Wrestler of the Year (2015)
    - Match of the Year (2015) – vs. Chris Hero at Live in Edinburgh
    - Match of the Year (2016) – vs. Jay Lethal at Superkick Party Vol. 2
    - Match of the Year (2018) – vs. Christopher Saynt at Live in Edinburgh
- Insane Championship Wrestling
  - ICW World Heavyweight Championship (2 times)
  - ICW Zero-G Championship (1 time)
  - ICW "Iron Man" (2014, 2015)
  - Wrestler of the Year Award (2014, 2016)
  - Male Wrestler of the Bammy Year Award (2015)
  - Square Go! (2017)
- Major League Wrestling
  - MLW Southern Crown Championship (1 time)
- Pro Wrestling Elite
  - Elite Rumble (2017)
- Pro Wrestling Illustrated
  - Ranked No. 171 of the top 500 singles wrestlers in the PWI 500 in 2019
- Scottish Wrestling Alliance
  - Scottish Heavyweight Championship (2 times)
  - SWA Laird of the Ring Championship (2 times)
  - Battlezone Rumble (2015, 2016)
- Target Wrestling
  - Target Wrestling Championship (1 time)
  - W3L Tag Team Championship (1 time) – with Mark Coffey
- WrestleZone
  - WrestleZone Undisputed Championship (1 time)
