= Scotch-Irish Canadians =

Ethnic group

Scottish-Irish Canadians
Regions with significant populations
- The Maritimes, Ontario, Manitoba, British Columbia

Languages
- Canadian English, Mid-Ulster English, Ulster Scots, Canadian French

Religion
- Predominantly Presbyterian

Related ethnic groups
- Ulster Scots, British Canadians (Scottish Canadians, Cornish Canadians, English Canadians, Welsh Canadians), Irish Canadians, Scottish-Irish Americans

Scottish-Irish Canadians or Scotch-Irish Canadians (French: Canadiens d'origine éccosaise-irlandaise) are those who are Ulster Scots or those who have Ulster Scots ancestry and live in or were born in Canada. Ulster Scots are Lowland Scots people and Northern English people who immigrated to the Irish Province of Ulster from the early 17th century after the accession of James I (James VI as King of Scotland) to the English throne. This was known as the Plantation of Ulster.

Scottish-Irish Canadians, ultimately originating from Scotland, observe many of the same customs and traditions as Scottish Canadians, who had arrived in Canada directly from Scotland. The surnames of Ulster Scots are similar to those of the Scots and many derive from Scottish clans. Many also wear the tartans.

== History ==
After the creation of British North America in 1763, Protestant Irish, both Irish Anglicans and Ulster-Scottish Presbyterians, migrated over the decades to Upper Canada, some as United Empire Loyalists or directly from Ulster.

The first significant number of Canadian settlers to arrive from Ireland were Protestants from predominantly Ulster and largely of Scottish descent who settled in the mainly central Nova Scotia in the 1760s. Many came through the efforts of colonizer Alexander McNutt. Some came directly from Ulster whilst others arrived after via New England.

Ulster-Scottish migration to Western Canada has two distinct components, those who came via eastern Canada or the US, and those who came directly from Ireland. Many who came West were fairly well assimilated, in that they spoke English and understood British customs and law, and tended to be regarded as just a part of English Canada. However, this picture was complicated by the religious division. Many of the original "English" Canadian settlers in the Red River Colony were fervent Irish loyalist Protestants, and members of the Orange Order.

In 1806, The Benevolent Irish Society (BIS) was founded as a philanthropic organization in St. John's, Newfoundland. Membership was open to adult residents of Newfoundland who were of Irish birth or ancestry, regardless of religious persuasion. The BIS was founded as a charitable, fraternal, middle-class social organization, on the principles of "benevolence and philanthropy", and had as its original objective to provide the necessary skills which would enable the poor to better themselves. Today the society is still active in Newfoundland and is the oldest philanthropic organization in North America.

In 1877, a breakthrough in Irish Canadian Protestant-Catholic relations occurred in London, Ontario. This was the founding of the Irish Benevolent Society, a brotherhood of Irishmen and women of both Catholic and Protestant faiths. The society promoted Irish Canadian culture, but it was forbidden for members to speak of Irish politics when meeting. This companionship of Irish people of all faiths quickly tore down the walls of sectarianism in Ontario. Today, the society is still operating.

For years, Prince Edward Island had been divided between Catholics and Protestants. In the latter half of the 20th century, this sectarianism diminished and was ultimately destroyed recently after two events occurred. Firstly, the Catholic and Protestant school boards were merged into one secular institution, and secondly, the practice of electing two MLAs for each provincial riding (one Catholic and one Protestant) was ended.

The Orange Order in Canada is a fraternal organization originating from Ulster. The group's name is a tribute to King William of Orange. Their holiday, The Twelfth, is celebrated by members and Ulster-Scots worldwide commemorating King William's victory of the Catholic King James at the Battle of the Boyne. The Orange Order's members must swear loyalty to the British Monarch and to uphold the teachings of Protestant Christianity. The order for a long time had huge political influence in Canada. By 1844, six of Toronto's ten aldermen were Orangemen, and over the rest of the nineteenth century twenty of twenty-three mayors would be as well. The organization is quite controversial and despised and labeled sectarian by Irish Catholics. A number of riots have ensued due to the Orange Order.

In 1913, the Orange Association of Manitoba volunteered a regiment to fight with the Ulster Volunteers against the new Irish government if Home Rule were to be introduced to Ireland. Orangemen played a big part in suppressing the Upper Canada Rebellion of William Lyon Mackenzie in 1837. Though the rebellion was short-lived, 317 Orangemen were sworn into the local militia by the Mayor of Toronto and then resisted Mackenzie's march down Yonge Street in 1837. They were involved in fighting against the Fenians at Ridgeway, Ontario in 1866. An obelisk there marks the spot where Orangemen died in defending the colony against an attack by members of Clan na Gael (commonly known as Fenians). Orangemen in western Canada helped suppress the rebellions of Louis Riel in 1870 and 1885. The murder of abducted Orangeman Thomas Scott was a turning point in the 1870 Red River Rebellion which caused the Dominion government to launch the Red River Expedition to restore order. The first Orange Warrant in Manitoba and the North West Territories was carried by a member of this expedition. The call to arms by Bro. Sir Sam Hughes, the Canadian Minister for War and member of LOL 557 Lindsay Ontario, resulted in some 80,000 members from Canada volunteering for service during the First World War.

== Notable people ==
- Stephen Boyd, actor (his parents, James Millar and Martha Boyd were Scotch-Irish Canadians)

Four Canadian prime ministers were Orange Order members:

- John A. Macdonald
- John Abbott
- Mackenzie Bowell
- John Diefenbaker

Arthur Meighen, the ninth Prime Minister who served two terms from July 1920 to December 1921 and again from June to September 1926 was born in Ontario, but his grandfather emigrated in 1839 from Bovevagh, near Dungiven, in County Londonderry

The Hart wrestling family through Stu Hart.

- Smith Hart
- Bruce Hart
- Keith Hart
- Wayne Hart
- Dean Hart
- Bret Hart
- Ross Hart
- Diana Hart
- Owen Hart
- Teddy Hart
- Matthew Annis Hart
- David Hart Smith
- Natalie Neidhart
- Matt Hart
