= Ben Bassarab =

Canadian professional wrestler

Personal information
- Born: Benjamin Bassarab; March 3, 1960 (age 66) Calgary, Alberta, Canada
- Spouse: Alison Hart (divorced)
- Children: 2
- Family: Hart

Professional wrestling career
- Ring name(s): Ben Bassarab; Canadian Lewis; Canadian Louis
- Billed height: 5 ft 10 in (1.78 m)
- Billed weight: 211 lb (96 kg; 15.1 st)
- Billed from: Philadelphia, Pennsylvania
- Trained by: Ross Hart; Stu Hart
- Debut: 1983
- Retired: 1992

Benjamin Bassarab (born March 3, 1960) is a Canadian former bodybuilder and professional wrestler, best known for his appearances for Stu Hart's Stampede Wrestling promotion throughout the 1980s. Bassarab is a two time Stampede International Tag Team champion. Wrestling historian Dave Meltzer described Bassarab as a semi-spectacular in-ring performer.

== Early life ==
Born in 1960 he is the son of Betty and Rusty Bassarab. He has two sisters named Whitney and Wendy and a brother, Rusty. Betty died of cancer in the early 80s and his father died in the late 90s. He grew up in Elbow Park, Calgary. Bassarab played hockey and football with the Glencoe Club. He also rode in some rodeos.

== Professional wrestling career ==
Around 1981 Bassarab was encouraged by his future brother-in-law Davey Boy Smith to pursue pro wrestling.

Bassarab was trained by Stu Hart and debuted in Hart's Calgary, Alberta based Stampede Wrestling promotion under his own name in 1983. Bassarab formed a tag team with Phil Lafleur. They faced Danny Davis and Hubert Gallant for the Stampede International Tag Team Championship in early 1984, but the match was ruled a no-contest and the title was vacated.

The acquisition of Stampede by Vince McMahon (owner of the World Wrestling Federation, WWF) in 1985 led to many Stampede wrestlers being signed by the WWF. The British Bulldogs, Jim Neidhart, Owen Hart, and Bret Hart were all hired, but Bassarab was not. Bassarab was active on the Stampede Wrestling roster until 1988. WWF subsequently used Bassarab on Canada shows, and Ben did face WWF wrestler Brutus Beefcake at the Maple Leaf Gardens in Toronto on July 28, 1985. Bassarab substituted for the absent Tony Garea and lost to Beefcake.

Bassarab began pursuing the International Tag Team Championship once more and began teaming with Chris Benoit. On March 1, 1986, in Regina, Saskatchewan, Bassarab and Benoit defeated Wayne Farris, and Rotten Ron Starr for the International Tag Team Championship. They lost the title to Farris and his new partner, The Cuban Assassin, on March 21 in Calgary.

Bassarab then formed a new team with his brother-in-law, Owen Hart. On August 9 in Edmonton, Alberta they defeated Duke Myers and Kerry Brown for the International Tag Team Championship. They held the title until October 3, when they lost to The Viet Cong Express (Hiroshi Hase and Fumihiro Niikura) in Calgary. Bassarab and Owen feuded with the Express throughout Western Canada, on one occasion fighting to a forty-five-minute draw, but were unable to regain the International Tag Team Championship.

Bassarab remained with Stampede for the remainder of his career. During the 80s Bassarab took short tours in Japan, working for Japan Pro-Wrestling, and All Japan Pro Wrestling. In 1987 Bassarab worked for the North American Wrestling Association. He also worked for the WWF when they toured Alberta in the 80s, and retired in 1992.

== Personal life ==
He married Stu Hart's daughter Alison Hart in May 1983. They were married briefly then separated. They have two children.

Bassarab regularly visited B.J's Gym in Calgary, which was owned by his brother-in-law B. J. Annis. He also worked in the juice bar at the gym for some time before becoming a wrestler.

In 1988 Bassarab was stabbed in a barfight, the incident severely damaged his liver.

After divorcing Hart he remarried at some point. He and his new wife attended both of the two funeral services for former brother-in-law Davey Boy Smith held by Smith's girlfriend Andrea Redding, and the other was held by former sister-in-law Diana Hart-Smith.

Bassarab later became the owner operator of a trucking business and, later, a warehouse foreman, before retiring to own a vending machine business and real estate company in Calgary. Ben later sold off the business and moved to the Maritimes.

== Championships and accomplishments ==
- Pro Wrestling This Week
  - Wrestler of the Week (December 1–6, 1986)
- Stampede Wrestling
  - Stampede International Tag Team Championship (2 times) - with Chris Benoit (1), Owen Hart (1)
- Canadian Wrestling Hall of Fame
  - Individually
  - With the Hart family
