= B. J. Annis =

American professional wrestler

Personal information
- Born: Bradley Joseph Annis; 1947 (age 78–79) Boston, Massachusetts, U.S.
- Education: United States Merchant Marine Academy
- Spouse: Georgia Hart (m. 1975)
- Children: 4, including Teddy Hart
- Family: Hart

Professional wrestling career
- Ring name: B. J. Annis
- Billed weight: 238 lb (108 kg)
- Billed from: Boston, Massachusetts
- Trained by: Stu Hart
- Debut: 1986

Bradley Joseph Annis (born 1947) is an American retired bodybuilder, powerlifter, fitness guru, professional wrestler, gym owner and firefighter. Annis is best known for his work for Stampede Wrestling and his ownership and handling of the Calgary gym at which many of the wrestlers trained. Annis is married to Georgia Hart, the daughter of wrestler Stu and wrestling promoter Helen Hart.

== Early life ==
Annis was born in Boston in 1947.

He earned a degree in marine engineering at the Kings Point military academy. He has also served a tour in Vietnam, he was a pilot.

== Career ==
=== Bodybuilding ===
Annis started bodybuilding at the age of 15. He competed mostly in Hawaii, which was also where he opened his first gym.

=== Stampede Wrestling ===
Annis wrestled sporadically for Stampede Wrestling. He had singles matches against wrestlers such as Kerry Brown, Mike Hammer, Cuban Assassin, Vladimir Krupoff, Gama Singh, Johnny Smith, Adolph Barbee, Makhan Singh, Karl Moffat and Drago Thomas among others. Annis participated in several tag teams together with Mr. Hito, Con Kovidis, Rick Patterson, George Skaaland and brothers-in-law Keith and Owen Hart, respectively. During his time wrestling for Stampede Wrestling he also challenged for the Stampede Wrestling International Tag Team Championship with George Skaaland and participated in a Battle Royal in 1986. Annis' favorite catchphrases were exclaiming "Ahhh Christ!" and "What’s good for the goose is good for the gander!"

Annis was the only one of Stu Hart's sons-in-law not to be stretched by him in the Hart family dungeon.

=== B. J's Gym ===
Annis also owned the gym located at 604 7 Ave. S.E. in Calgary where many of the wrestlers of Stampede Wrestling trained, such as Dynamite Kid, The British Bulldog and the McGuire twins, called B.J's Gym. The gym opened in 1972 and stretches 12,500 square-foot and contained with cardio equipment, weights and a juice bar. Bret Hart trained weekly at B.J's gym while recovering from his stroke.

The gym closed in 2011 and Annis has stated that he has no interest in opening a new one, instead enjoying retirement with his family and possibly buying a new house. In November 2011, his daughter Angie Annis staged an art exhibition at the gymnasium prior to the establishment closing its doors. Much of the outer walls of the gym were filled with graffiti, often featuring hearts, as a reference to the Hart family.

== Wrestling related ==
Annis appeared for WWF in 1997 at the PPV In Your House 16: Canadian Stampede, he and his brother-in-law Wayne were punched and thrown over the guard rails by Stone Cold Steve Austin. Annis and his son Edward have held free presentations in Calgary to show the dangers of pro wrestling moves if performed incorrectly, and make people understand that everything that people see in the ring is carefully choreographed. Annis did this mostly because of worry that young children would try to imitate the movies they saw on TV and end up injuring themselves or others. In 2013 Annis participated in promoting a Next Generation Wrestling show in which parts of the profit went to the For the Love of Children Society of Alberta charity.

== Personal life ==
Annis is married to Georgia Hart, seventh child of pro wrestling patriarch Stu Hart, and the sister of Smith, Bruce, Keith, Wayne, Dean, Ellie, Bret, Alison, Ross, Diana and Owen Hart. Annis and Hart did not reveal their marriage to Hart's family for several months after the fact, which caused volatile reception from the Hart family.

Annis had with his wife four children, Edward, better known under his ring name Teddy Hart, Annie, Angela and Matthew Annis. Matthew wished to become a professional wrestler like his brother but died in 1996 at the age of thirteen.

Annis has a grandson, Bradley Matthew Annis, from his son Ted and his ex-girlfriend Kim.

In the late 1970s, he urged his brother-in-law, Keith Hart, to try out for the Calgary firefighter department. Hart passed a test and was accepted into the Calgary firefighter department. As a result, Hart largely reduced his wrestling commitments.

Brother-in-law Davey Boy Smith has stated that due to the fact that Annis's son had died of a staph infection he recognized an infection in both of Smith's legs and informed him that he needed to get antibiotics right away.

Annis lived in the East Village in Calgary from 1972 to 2012.

== Championships and accomplishments ==
=== Bodybuilding ===
- Alberta Canada Masters Bodybuilding Champ (1989)

=== Professional Wrestling ===
- Kocosports Combat Sports Hall of Fame
  - Class of 2012
- Canadian Wrestling Hall of Fame
  - Class of 2016
