= Donald Stewart =

Donald Stewart or Don Stewart may refer to:

== Arts and entertainment ==
- Donald Alexander Stewart (1876–1940), Scottish architect
- Donald Ogden Stewart (1894–1980), American author and screenwriter
- Donald Stewart (actor) (1910–1966), American actor
- Donald Franklin Stewart (1929–1996), American museum curator
- Donald E. Stewart (1930–1999), American screenwriter
- Donald Bruce Stewart (1935–2006), American actor
- Donald Stewart, character from TV show Benidorm

== Law and politics ==
- Donald Stewart (Wisconsin politician) (1825–?), American politician in Wisconsin
- Donald Stewart (North Dakota politician) (born ca. 1832), Scottish-born American politician in North Dakota
- Donald Stewart (Scottish politician) (1920–1992), Scottish National Party politician
- Donald Morton Stewart (1923–1990), Canadian politician in the Northwest Territories
- Donald Stewart (judge) (1928–2016), Australian judge and Royal Commissioner
- H. Donald Stewart (born 1939), American politician in the New Jersey General Assembly
- Donald Stewart (Alabama politician) (born 1940), U.S. Senator from Alabama
- Don Stewart (Newfoundland politician) (born 1946), Canadian politician in Newfoundland
- Don Stewart (Ontario politician), Canadian federal politician in Ontario

== Sports ==
- Donald Stewart (tennis) (1859–1885), British tennis player
- Don Stewart (Australian footballer) (1913–1979), Australian rules footballer
- Don Stewart (rugby league) (born 1967), Western Samoan international rugby league footballer
- Don Stewart (high jumper), winner of the 1957 and 1958 NCAA DI outdoor high jump championship

== Others ==
- Sir Donald Stewart, 1st Baronet (1824–1900), British field marshal
- Donald William Stewart (1860–1905), British military officer
- Don Stewart (Bonaire activist) (1925–2014), American environmental activist
- Donald Lee Stewart (born 1939), American Pentecostal minister and faith healer
- Donald Scott Stewart, American mechanical engineer
- Donald Stewart, legal name of Daaga (died 1837), executed rebel against British authority in Trinidad

== See also ==
- Stewart Donald (born 1970s), businessman and owner of Sunderland A.F.C.
- Donald Stuart (disambiguation)
