= Martha Hart =

Canadian philanthropist (born 1966)

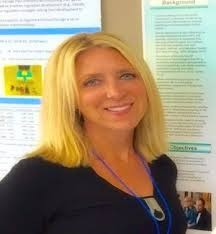
- Hart at the International Attachment Conference in New York City, 2019
- Born: Martha Joan Patterson; October 31, 1966 (age 59); Calgary, Alberta, Canada
- Education: Psychology and sociology
- Alma mater: University of Calgary (B.A.); University of Cambridge (M.A., PhD)
- Occupations: Philanthropist; researcher
- Years active: 2000–present
- Spouse: Owen Hart (m. 1989; died 1999)
- Children: 2
- Family: Hart

Martha Joan Hart (née Patterson; born October 31, 1966) is a Canadian philanthropist and researcher known for her advocacy work following the death of her husband, professional wrestler Owen Hart. After her husband died in an accident at Over the Edge (1999), Hart sued the World Wrestling Federation (now WWE). She later wrote a bestselling book about Owen's life, founded a charity in his name (The Owen Hart Foundation), and has subsequently been involved in several legal cases involving his image.

== Early and personal life ==
Hart was born Martha Joan Patterson on October 31, 1966, the youngest of eleven children. Her mother, Joan, battled breast cancer before Martha and her sister Virginia were born; her father left her mother when Martha was young. She completed two degrees at the University of Calgary in Psychology (with distinction) and Sociology (1st-class honours) before moving to England to complete a master's degree and a PhD in Social and Development Psychology at Cambridge University. She has since worked as a university researcher in the area of pediatrics.

In 1982, she met her husband Owen Hart at the age of 15, while they were both still in high school. She attended a Stampede Wrestling event with a friend, and met Owen after recognizing him as one of the wrestlers who attended her school for a wrestling practice. They married on July 1, 1989, and had two children together: Oje Edward Hart and Athena Christie Hart. Owen died while performing a stunt on May 23, 1999, at the World Wrestling Federation (WWF)'s Over the Edge pay-per-view. As a result of the charitable contributions achieved through the Owen Hart Foundation, Martha was named Individual Philanthropist of the Year in 2004 by the AFP. She was Calgary's 2011 Champions of Learning. Hart was named the 2017 Goodwill Ambassador for the Monaco International Film Festival. Hart has had a long-standing relationship with this non-profit international special interest film festival and is also the Monaco International Film Festival's Vice President of the Angel Film Awards. In her spare time, she writes a popular movie blog, titled, "Movie Meanings – Main Messages" about how to find the meaning of life through the movies we watch.

== Professional career ==
=== Research ===
Hart is a researcher at the University of Calgary/Alberta Children's Hospital. Her present research includes co-creating and pilot testing the Attachment and Child Health (ATTACH) Intervention, which explores links between parental reflective function (RF) and parent/child attachment led by Nicole Letourneau. Hart presented findings on the program at a number International Attachment Related Conferences in New York, London, Miami, Prague; and in Vancouver. The ATTACH Program is funded by Harvard University's Centre for the Developing Child as one of their Frontiers of Innovation projects. In 2019, Hart and Nicole Letourneau launched their ATTACH™ Program online.

Hart completed two degrees at the University of Calgary before moving to England to join the Centre for Family Research at the University of Cambridge where she completed her master's degree and Ph.D. programs in Social & Developmental Psychology under supervisor Claire Hughes. Hart worked as a researcher at the University of Cambridge with Ruth Gaunt for several years researching the division of labor in the family and parents’ child care choices before joining the team at the University of Calgary.

Hart's past research also consisted of working on a University of Cambridge-based longitudinal project investigating the early origins of children's problem behaviour/self-esteem within a diverse sample, and how social correlates predicts such characteristics, while focusing on children's friendship/sibling/teacher relationships, as well as mother's parenting style and mental states (e.g. self-esteem, depression) and the impact on children's social (problem) behaviour and mental states (e.g. self-esteem) and prosocial behaviour in single/non-single mother households.

She has published various peer-reviewed papers, including a top cited article in the 2020–2021 Infant Mental Health Journal on the effect of parental reflective function and has co-edited Development and Adaptation: Seminal Papers on the Dynamic-Maturational Model of Attachment and Adaptation, published by Waterside Press, and she has also co-authored with another book in publication titled Parenting and Child Development.

Hart was trained to administer the PDI at Yale University and the AAI by Howard Steele and Miriam Steele at the New School University New York, as well as Erik Hesse and Mary Main at Berkeley University. Hart is also trained by Howard Steele in RF (PDI), and in Reflective Family Play by Dianne Philip – at The Hincks-Dellcrest Centre Toronto. In addition, Hart trained with Alan Sroufe, and Elizabeth Carlson at the University of Minnesota, and Marinus van IJzendoorn at Cambridge University in the ABCD model of attachment, William Whelan in the MAC attachment measure at University of Virginia, as well as Patricia Crittenden in the DMM; she is a certified reliable coder in various attachment measures, RF measures, as well as a number of other parent/child interaction measures. She is also trained and certified in Suicide Prevention.

Hart is also a past recipient of the University of Calgary's Eyes High Post-Doctoral Award.

=== Owen Hart Foundation ===
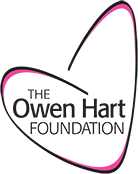
Owen Hart Foundation logo

In December 2000, she announced the opening of the Owen Hart Foundation, a Calgary-based charity that provides university/college scholarships for children in need, as well as housing for low income families. The Owen Hart Foundation also supports a number of other worthwhile charities in the Calgary community and provides "scholarships, housing and various forms of assistance to at-risk communities around the world, including doing food drives, backpack giveaways and Christmas projects".

Every year, as a tribute to Owen Hart, Martha hosts a high-profile fundraising event for the Owen Hart Foundation. The 2000–2003 charity events were in support of YouVille Women's Residence, a shelter for abused women. Starting in 2004, the charity events have included a guest star; guest stars have included, Bob Newhart, 2004; Paul Anka, 2005; Neil Sedaka, 2006; Bill Cosby, 2007; Howie Mandel, 2008; Jerry Seinfeld, 2009–10th Anniversary; Ringo Starr and his All Starr Band, 2010; Russell Brand, 2011; Robin Williams (with special guest David Steinberg), 2012; Steve Martin and Martin Short, 2013; Dane Cook, 2014–15th Anniversary. Seth Meyers performed on October 2 for the 2015 event. Elvis Costello performed on December 10, 2016, for the 17th anniversary of the OHF. In 2017, for Canada's 150th birthday, The Owen Hart Foundation wanted to honor a Canadian artist and therefore featured Sarah McLachlan on December 1, 2017, to mark their 18th anniversary. Famed actor and SNL superstar Alec Baldwin performed for the OHF's 19th anniversary annual event on November 30, 2018. In 2020, comedian Jerry Seinfeld returned as the headliner to commemorate the OHF's 20th Anniversary. In 2021, OHF hosted a sold-out performance featuring the Canadian comedian, Russell Peters.

Hart has stated that she started the Owen Hart Foundation to create a meaningful legacy for Owen and because she knew he would be happy that she was helping people in his name, especially in the area of education which was very important to both of them.

In September 2021, the Owen Hart Foundation announced a partnership with All Elite Wrestling (AEW) to honour Owen Hart's legacy. The partnership will entail AEW hosting an annual tournament called the "Owen Hart Cup" along with the production of Owen Hart-branded merchandise include action figures, apparel, posters, and an appearance in a console video game being developed by AEW. At Double or Nothing in May 2022, Martha Hart appeared at the event to congratulate the Owen Hart Cup's inaugural male and female winners, Adam Cole and Dr. Britt Baker; Martha and her children previously were shown on the May 11, 2022 episode of AEW Dynamite, but did not have a live television appearance.

=== Book ===
In 2002, Martha Hart started writing a book titled Broken Harts: The Life and Death of Owen Hart that was released in 2004, which is about their life together from when they met as teens and the life they created for their two children. Her book was a #1 Best Seller in Canada, and is now published in several countries including the United States and the United Kingdom, with all of her proceeds allocated to charity.

== Lawsuits and disputes ==
=== Owen Hart's death ===
Three weeks after Owen's death, Hart launched a wrongful death lawsuit against the WWF by the help of aviation lawyer Gary C. Robb; she included her children and Owen's parents on the lawsuit, which was settled out of court for approximately $18 million on November 2, 2000. She set aside millions of the settlement to establish the Owen Hart Foundation. She has managed the foundation since 1999. She gave $2 million to Owen Hart's parents. After the lawsuit, Martha separated herself from the majority of the Hart family. She criticized those family members who worked against her with the WWF. In the end she remained friends with only Keith, Wayne and Bret Hart out of Owen's ten living siblings.

=== Diana Hart's Under the Mat ===
There is real-life tension between Martha and her sister-in-law Diana Hart-Smith. Martha sued Diana and claims that Diana's book, Under the Mat: Inside Wrestling's Greatest Family, is both slanderous and libelous, and had it removed from markets everywhere; Martha was issued a public apology by the publishers, who were also required to give an undisclosed amount as a donation to the Owen Hart Foundation as stated in the settlement agreement.

=== Hart family DVD ===
On June 22, 2010, Martha filed another lawsuit against Vince and Linda McMahon, this time for wrongfully using Owen's name and likeness in numerous DVDs under the WWE name, as well as for deceptive business practices, and not paying royalty payments to Owen's estate and his children. On April 4, 2012, Judge Underhill agreed that Martha's claims against the WWE should go forward regarding the use of family/personal photos without her permission – copyright infringement, as well as breach of contract for not paying royalties from money made (and kept) by the WWE from merchandise sold with Owen's likeness since his death in 1999. In April 2013, the lawsuit was settled.

=== Nancy Grace ===
On April 9, 2014, Nancy Grace of CNN/HLN ran a show on the death of The Ultimate Warrior; the segment focused on wrestlers who had died of drug abuse. During the discussion, a list of wrestlers who died 'young' scrolled up in the background, which included Owen Hart's name. Martha Hart wrote to CNN/HLN about the implication, which resulted in Nancy Grace delivering an on-air retraction/apology on April 14, 2014, about the mistake relating specifically to Owen Hart.
