= Pamela Fischer =

Pamela Fischer may refer to:

- Pamela Fischer (lawyer), Canadian lawyer
- Pamela Fischer (synchronized swimmer) (born 1988), Swiss synchronised swimmer
