= CanadaOne =

- Managing editor: Julie King
- Categories: Business magazine
- Frequency: 10 times per year
- Circulation: approx. 60,000–80,000 unique visitors monthly
- Publisher: Biz-Zone Internet Group Inc.
- First issue: March 3, 1998
- Country: Canada
- Language: English
- Website: www.canadaone.com

CanadaOne is a free online business magazine targeting small business owners and micro businesses in Canada. The site was launched on March 3, 1998, and was first represented by Clickthrough (which later became 24/7 Real Media Canada), then joined the Canoe.ca network in March 2009, News stories are published on an ongoing basis and articles are published in 10 issues throughout the year, on the first business day of each publication month. CanadaOne is now a publication of Biz-Zone Internet Group Inc.

In addition to business news and articles, the site also has a business directory that is only open to businesses based in Canada and a Canadian business events calendar. CanadaOne added a Verified Canadian program to its business directory as well as free promotional pages for each business listed.
