= Keith Hart (wrestler) =

Canadian professional wrestler (born 1951)

Personal information
- Born: Keith William Hart; August 21, 1951 (age 74) Great Falls, Montana, U.S.
- Spouses: Leslie duBerger (divorced) Joan Hart (m. 2002)
- Children: 3
- Family: Hart

Professional wrestling career
- Ring name(s): Keith Hart; Keith Stark; Ted Keath
- Billed height: 180 cm (5 ft 11 in)
- Billed weight: 94 kg (207 lb)
- Billed from: Calgary, Alberta
- Trained by: Stu Hart
- Debut: 1973
- Retired: 2000

Keith William Hart (born August 21, 1951) is an American born-Canadian retired professional wrestler and firefighter. He is a member of the Hart wrestling family and the third child of Helen and Stu Hart. He is best known for his work for Stampede Wrestling and several appearances for WWE, often with his siblings Bret, Owen, Bruce and Diana. In Stampede he won several championships and for WWE he participated in the seventh edition of Survivor Series.

== Early life ==
Hart is the third child of wrestling promoter Stu Hart and his wife Helen, thus he is the younger brother of Smith and Bruce and the older brother of Wayne, Dean, Ellie, Georgia, Bret, Alison, Ross, Diana and Owen Hart.

He is of Greek descent through his maternal grandmother and Irish through his maternal grandfather. His father was mainly of Scots-Irish descent but also had Scottish and English ancestry. Hart is a dual citizen of Canada and the United States.

Before becoming a wrestler, Keith Hart earned a degree in teaching.

== Amateur wrestling ==
Hart had a lot of experience in amateur wrestling during his youth, something he did mostly to please his father.

Competing for the University of Saskatchewan, he earned a bronze medal at the west division championships in 1974.

== Professional wrestling career ==
=== Stampede Wrestling (1973–1989) ===
Hart trained under his father and began wrestling on June 1, 1973 in his father's promotion, Stampede Wrestling, facing Lindy Calder in his debut match. He spent much of his career as a tag team wrestler, teaming with wrestlers such as his brother Bret, with whom he won the Stampede International Tag Team Championship four times. He feuded with wrestlers such as Dick Steinborn, Dynamite Kid, Herbert Gallant, K J Anderssen, Mr. Hito, and Mr. Sakurada. As a singles wrestler he held the British Commonwealth Mid Heavyweight title. In addition to wrestling in Canada, Hart performed in Germany, Japan and made infrequent appearances in the United States of America. At one point, Dave Meltzer referred to Hart as one of the best jobbers in wrestling.

=== World Wrestling Federation (1993) ===
As part of the feud between Bret and Jerry Lawler, at the 1993 Survivor Series Bret and his brothers Keith, Bruce and Owen faced Shawn Michaels and his three masked knights. Though Owen was eliminated and Keith's shoulder was injured by a prolonged assault at the hands of Michaels, the Hart brothers were victorious.

=== Return to Stampede Wrestling (1995–2000) ===
In the 1990s, Hart worked as a trainer in the Hart Dungeon (the wrestling training camp located in the basement of the Hart family mansion). He eventually retired in 1995 to become a full-time firefighter, although he briefly came out of retirement in 1999 when Stampede Wrestling was reopened by his brothers Bruce and Ross Hart. Hart became a tag team champion with Chris Benoit.

== After wrestling ==
In the late 1970s, at the urging of his brother-in-law, B. J. Annis, Hart passed a test and was accepted into the Calgary Fire Department. As a result, he largely reduced his wrestling commitments. Hart would work for Annis until 2007, when he retired from firefighting after 26 years and began working as a substitute teacher. He is known to teach in Calgary and Okotoks (just outside Calgary).

In the 1993 Alberta provincial election, Keith was the Liberal Party of Alberta's candidate in the Northeast Calgary riding of Calgary-Cross, coming in 2nd place with 33.12% of the vote.

== Other media ==
Hart has appeared on several wrestling documentaries, including the 1998 documentary Wrestling with Shadows and 2010's Survival of the Hitman which are both about his younger brother Bret. Hart was also present on the stage together with all his living siblings when his father Stu Hart was posthumously inducted into the WWE Hall of Fame.

== Personal life ==
In 1993 Hart and his first wife won $100,000 in a lottery. He spent some of the money on an unsuccessful campaign to get elected to provincial office.

=== Family ===
Hart has three sons with his ex-wife Leslie, Stewart Hart II, Conor Hart and Brock Hart. The couple divorced in 1995. Conor pursued amateur wrestling at the University of Calgary and coaches a local high school team. His other son Stewart has also pursued amateur wrestling and has won a medal in his school championship but does not wish to work with pro wrestling.

In 2002 Keith married for the second time to his long-time girlfriend Joan.

=== Wrestling related ===
Following the death of Stu Hart on October 16, 2003, the Hart family sold the Hart mansion. On August 14, 2004 Hart organised a fundraiser, held within the mansion, for the Stu Hart Amateur Sport Foundation (which supports amateur wrestling in the Calgary area).

== Championships and accomplishments ==
- Canadian Wrestling Hall of Fame
  - Class of 2001
- Can Am Wrestling Federation
  - CAWF Tag Team Championship (1 time) - with Vinnie Fever
- Pro Wrestling Illustrated
  - PWI ranked him #341 of the 500 best singles wrestlers in the PWI 500 in 1995 and 1996
- Polynesian Pacific Wrestling
  - PPW Tag Team Championship (1 time) - with Bruce Hart
- Prairie Wrestling Alliance
  - Prairie Wrestling Alliance Hall of Fame (Class of 2010)
- Ring Wrestling Magazine
  - Rookie of the Year (1973)
- Stampede Wrestling
  - NWA International Tag Team Championship (Calgary version) (8 times) - with Leo Burke (2), Hubert Gallant (1) and Bret Hart (5)
  - Stampede British Commonwealth Mid-Heavyweight Championship (2 times)
  - Stampede International Tag Team Championship (1 time) - with Chris Benoit
  - Stampede World Mid-Heavyweight Championship (1 time)
  - Stampede Wrestling Hall of Fame (Class of 1995)
