= Hart wrestling family =

Canadian wrestling family

Hart
- Current region: Calgary, Alberta
- Earlier spellings: Hardt
- Etymology: German meaning Hard. Spoken with Irish Ulster Scots dialects.
- Origin: Canada
- Members: Stu Hart; Smith Hart; Wayne Hart; Bruce Hart; Keith Hart; Dean Hart; Bret Hart; Ross Hart; Diana Hart; Owen Hart; Teddy Hart; Natalya Neidhart; Davey Boy Smith Jr.; Mike Hart; Kristen Hart; Lara Hart; Matt Hart
- Connected members: Helen Hart Martha Hart B. J. Annis Ben Bassarab Davey Boy Smith Jim Neidhart Tom Billington Tyson Kidd Pete Wilson Roddy Piper Teal Piper Harry Smith Donald Stewart
- Connected families: Billington family, Toombs family
- Distinctions: Wrestling family
- Traditions: Professional wrestling Sunday dinner
- Estate: Hart House

The Hart wrestling family, sometimes known as the Hart dynasty, is a mainly Canadian family with a significant history within professional wrestling. The patriarch of the family was wrestling legend Stu Hart (1915–2003). An amateur and professional wrestling performer, promoter and trainer, Stu owned and operated his own wrestling promotion, Stampede Wrestling. He also trained some of the most well known stars in wrestling history including "Superstar" Billy Graham, Fritz Von Erich, Chris Benoit, and his own sons Bret Hart and Owen Hart.

All of Stu's eight sons were wrestlers and two of them, Bret and Owen, achieved considerable fame and success in the World Wrestling Federation (WWF, now WWE), with many of the WWF's biggest storylines in the mid-1990s being built around Bret and Owen and their brothers-in-law. The family is closely associated with Canada in the North American wrestling landscape and its Canadian heritage has often been emphasized in wrestling storylines, even to the point of overt opposition to American culture, but most of its members also have American citizenship through the family's American matriarch, Helen Hart.

As of 2026, the only Hart actively wrestling in WWE is Stu's granddaughter Natalie "Natalya" Neidhart, but Bret makes occasional guest appearances while WWE employs Dungeon graduate Tyson Kidd (also Neidhart's husband) as a producer.

== Members ==
=== Patriarch and matriarch ===
- Stewart Edward "Stu" Hart (May 3, 1915 – October 16, 2003), patriarch of the Hart family, wrestler, dungeon trainer and founder of Stampede Wrestling.
- Helen Louise Smith Hart (February 16, 1924 – November 4, 2001), matriarch of the Hart family. Was married to Stu Hart from December 31, 1947, until her death. Stu and Helen had 12 children, born from 1948 to 1965, as listed below. Helen had initially been told by doctors that she might not be able to bear children at all because she was born prematurely. This turned out to be incorrect and Helen originally wanted to have 15 children but could not for medical reasons.

=== Direct descendants ===
==== Sons and daughters of Stu and Helen ====
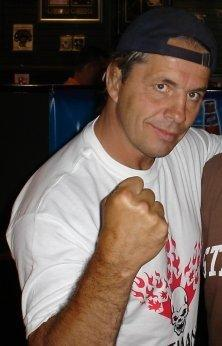
Bret Hart

- Smith Stewart (November 28, 1948 – July 2, 2017), professional wrestler, promoter and booker.
- Bruce Ambrose Edwardious, (born January 13, 1950), retired professional wrestler and booker.
- Keith William (born August 21, 1951), retired professional wrestler.
- Wayne Curtis Michael (born November 19, 1952), wrestled briefly but was mainly a referee.
- Dean Harry Anthony (January 3, 1954 – November 21, 1990), professional wrestler and referee.
- Elizabeth "Ellie" Patricia (born February 4, 1955), has made several appearances on WWF/WWE television, including Total Divas.
- Georgia Louise (born May 21, 1956), made several appearances on WWF television.
- Bret Sergeant (born July 2, 1957), retired professional wrestler.
- Alison Joan (born July 18, 1958), made several appearances on WWF television.
- Ross Lindsay (born January 3, 1960), retired professional wrestler, trainer, booker and promoter.
- Diana Joyce (born October 8, 1963), was involved in WWF storylines in the 90s and has written several wrestling related books.
- Owen James (May 7, 1965 – May 23, 1999), professional wrestler.

==== In-laws and grandchildren ====
Smith had six children, four of which are his biologically, daughters Tobi McIvor with a woman named Marla Josephson, and Satania "Tania" Hart (6 March 1985 – 14 March 2022) with his wife Maria Rosado Hart, a son Matt Hart with Liane Reiger Herweg and son Chad Pointen with "Zoe" Zo Amber Lee Beattie,

Bruce has five children in total, daughters Brit, and Lara as well as sons Bruce Jr, Torrin and Rhett Hart with his ex-wife Andrea Reding Hart. From 2000 to 2002, while Bruce was still legally married to Andrea, Andrea was in a relationship with Diana Hart's ex-husband Davey Boy Smith, until Smith's death from a heart attack in May 2002. On December 27, 2019, Andrea died at the age of 52.

Keith has three children with his ex-wife Leslie duBerger Hart, Stewart Hart II, Conor Hart and Brock Hart. After his divorce Keith would remarry with another woman named Joan in 2002.

Wayne is married to Lynn.

Dean had one child with his girlfriend Tammy, a daughter by the name of Farrah Hart, born in April 1990.

Ellie had three daughters with her husband, wrestler Jim Neidhart. Jennifer Neidhart, Natalie Neidhart (better known as Natalya), and Kristen Culbreth. Ellie and Jim divorced in 2001, but remarried to each other in 2010.

Georgia had four children with her husband, bodybuilder, gym owner, fitness guru and part-time wrestler Bradley Joseph "BJ" Annis. Edward, better known as Teddy Hart, Matthew, Annie and Angela Annis. On July 4, 1996, Matthew fell ill and was diagnosed with the flesh eating disease Necrotizing fasciitis. On July 16, 1996, Matthew died at the age of 13.

Bret and his first wife Julie Smadu Hart have four children, Jade Lambros, Dallas Hart, Alexandra Sabina "Beans" Hart and Blade Hart. Bret and Julie divorced in 2002. Bret married his second wife Cinzia Rota in 2004, but they divorced in 2007. Bret married his third wife Stephanie Washington in 2010.

Alison Hart has two children with her ex-husband, wrestler Ben Bassarab, Lindsay and Brooke B Hart. After their divorce Bassarab remarried to another woman.

Diana married wrestler Davey Boy Smith and had two children with him, Harry and Georgia Smith. Diana and Davey divorced in 2000. Diana has also dated pro wrestler James Trimble, who has worked for Ross and Bruce's incarnation of Stampede Wrestling.

Owen and his wife Martha had one son, Oje and one daughter, Athena. The name Oje is a derivative of Owen's first and middle name Owen and James, it was also Owen's nickname when he was younger. At the time of Owen's death in May 1999, he and Martha were planning on having a third child.

Tom Billington and Michelle Smadu Billington's three children, one son named Marek, and two daughters named Bronwyne Jewel and Amaris Jayne, are counted among the Hart grandchildren, since their parents were considered part of the Hart family, largely due to Tom's big role in Stampede Wrestling, Michelle being a sister of Bret Hart's first wife, Julie, as well as Tom being the cousin of Davey Boy Smith. After her divorce from Tom in 1991, Michelle would later on marry another man and have two twin children, Trey Liam Burbank and Trinity Eve Burbank.

==== Great-grandchildren and in-laws ====
Tobi McIvor has three daughters, Jessica and Amanda Steed born in 1995 and 1996 respectively, and Isabella McIvor, born in 2006. Tobi is married to a man named Mike McIvor.

Edward Annis (Teddy Hart) has a son, Bradley Annis, with his ex-girlfriend Kim, born in 2001. Hart has also married a woman named Fay. She has been involved in his wrestling career. Annis and his wife have divorced.

Jade Hart Lambros has a daughter named Kyra Beans (born June 2010) with her husband Steve Lambros.

Alexandra Sabina Hart has a son, Grayson Knight Cassidy (born June 20, 2015, at 1:25 am).

Dallas Hart has a daughter named Vylet Louise Hart.

Kristen Culbreth has two sons with her husband: Lachlan, (pronounced Lock-lin) and Maddox Culbreth.

Natalie Neidhart (Natalya) is married to fellow wrestler TJ Wilson (Tyson Kidd).

Brooke Hart is married to Peter Minnema better known under his ring name "Pistol" Pete Wilson.

Conor Hart is married to a woman named Inka Foster Hart.

Farrah Hart has one daughter named Bria.

Brock Patrick Hart is married to a woman named Melissa Johnson Hart.

Brit is married to a man by the name Jamie Harling, who works with her at the Rouge restaurant in Calgary.

Georgia Smith was engaged to British musician Adam Barry, the singer of the band Merrymouth.

==== Descendants of Stu and Helen Hart ====
1. Smith Stewart Hart
  1. Tobi Louise McIvor
    1. Amanda Steed
    2. Jessica Steed
    3. Isabella McIvor
  2. Satania Ecstasy Atlantis "Tania" Hart
  3. Matthew Aryan Dean "Matt" Herweg
    1. Ezrah Herweg
  4. Chad Dean Pointen
2. Bruce Ambrose Edwardious Hart,
  1. Brittany "Brit" Hart
  2. Bruce Hart Jr.
  3. Torrin Rex Hart
  4. Rhettger Hart
  5. Lara Helen Hart
3. Keith William Hart
  1. Stewart Hart II
  2. Conor Hart
  3. Brock Patrick Hart
4. Wayne Curtis Michael Hart
5. Dean Harry Anthony "Bizz" Hart
  1. Farrah "Fara" Hart
6. Elizabeth "Ellie" Patricia Hart-Neidhart
  1. Jennifer "Jenni" Neidhart
  2. Natalie Katherine "Nattie" Neidhart
  3. Kristen "Muffy" Neidhart-Culbreth
    1. Lachlan Culbreth
    2. Maddox Culbreth
7. Georgia Louise Hart-Annis
  1. Edward Ellsworth "Teddy" Annis
    1. Bradley Matthew Annis
  2. Matthew David Annis
  3. Angela "Angie"Annis
  4. Annie Annis
8. Bret Sergeant Hart
  1. Jade Michelle Koo Hart Lambros
    1. Kyra Beans Lambros
    2. Bo Lambrose
  2. Dallas Jeffery "Dal" Hart
    1. Vylet Louise Hart
  3. Alexandra Sabina "Beans" Hart
    1. Grayson Knight Cassidy
    2. River Reign Rambaransingh
  4. Blade Colton Hart
    1. Poppy Jade Hart
9. Alison Joan Hart-Bassarab
  1. Lindsay Bassarab Hart
  2. Brooke Bassarab Hart-Minnema
10. Ross Lindsay Hart
11. Diana Joyce Hart-Smith
  1. Harry Francis Smith
  2. Georgia Smith
12. Owen James Hart
  1. Oje Edward Hart
  2. Athena Christie Hart

=== Other ===
In his autobiography, wrestler Roddy Piper (father of wrestler Teal Piper) states that he is a cousin of the Hart family he also made this statement in an interview on TNA. This fact was used as a trivia question on Raw once. Bret Hart has also stated that Piper was the only wrestler to visit him in the hospital after his stroke and that they were as close as brothers.

3rd nephew of Owen Hart, Kevin Hart-Payne was arrested on cocaine charges in Orillia, Ontario on March 31st of 2021.

==== Close associates ====
Wrestling promoter Jack Pfefer was a very close friend of Stu Hart who asked him to be the godfather of Hart's tenth child and seventh son, Ross.

Brian Pillman was another very close wrestler to the family and the only person who wasn't related to the Harts through either blood or marriage to wrestle as a member of the Hart Foundation. He has stated that he considered Bret and Owen as brothers to him and that he would have done anything for them. Pillman's son Brian Pillman Jr. also works with and is close to the family.

Chris Benoit was also very close to the Hart family. Bret Hart referred to him as like a family member.

==== Storyline relatives ====
In the late 80s the Stampede storylines also included a fictional brother of Davey Boy Smith by the name of Johnny Smith who feuded with Davey and Owen, the storyline also involved Diana Hart, who was worried over how Johnny's behaviour would affect their family.

== History ==
=== Amateur wrestling ===
Stu Hart was an experienced grappler who held many national championships. Several of his sons, including Keith, Dean, Bret and Owen had experience in amateur wrestling. With Bret and Owen being considered outstanding as young men. Conor and Stewart Hart, two of Keith's sons pursued amateur wrestling, Conor did so at the University of Calgary and Stewart won a medal in his school championship.

=== Professional wrestling ===
The Hart family is one of the most well-known professional wrestling families in history. The patriarch of the family, Stu Hart was a professional wrestler and a trainer as well as the owner of Stampede Wrestling. Many of his children became professional wrestlers. He became involved with wrestling after retiring from his career with the Edmonton Eskimos of the Canadian Football League. Stu began promoting wrestling in 1948 and operated Stampede Wrestling until selling it to Vince McMahon in 1984. In 1985, however, he decided to revive the promotion, which remained in operation until December 1989. It was brought back again in 1999 by Bruce and Ross Hart and remains active today. Stu Hart has been noted from training some of North America's most famous wrestlers, including André the Giant, the "British Bulldog" Davey Boy Smith, Dynamite Kid, Junkyard Dog, and dozens more in addition to his own sons.

Bret Hart has won the most wrestling championships of anyone in the family. He won his first title belt in the World Wrestling Federation while teaming with brother-in-law Jim Neidhart (Ellie Hart's husband) to form The Hart Foundation tag team. They had a feud with The British Bulldogs (Diana Hart's husband Davey Boy Smith and Bret Hart's sister-in-law's husband Dynamite Kid, who were first cousins in real life). On January 26, 1987, Hart and Neidhart defeated the Bulldogs to win the WWF Tag Team Championship. After the Hart Foundation split up, Owen Hart began teaming with Neidhart as The New Foundation. Bret went on to have a successful career as a singles wrestler, holding the WWF World Heavyweight Championship five times.

The family connection played a role in two major WWF storylines. Four of the Hart brothers (Bret, Owen, Keith, and Bruce) formed a team at Survivor Series 1993. Animosity began to build between Bret and Owen, and Owen turned on Bret at Royal Rumble 1994. This led to a feud between the two brothers; Neidhart later became involved on Owen's side, while Smith sided with Bret. The feud culminated with Owen costing Bret the WWF World Heavyweight Championship. While Bret was defending the title against Bob Backlund at Survivor Series 1994, Owen tricked his mother Helen into throwing a towel into the ring to signify that Bret conceded defeat.

Several years later, the Hart Foundation was formed again, this time as a stable of anti-American wrestlers. Bret and Owen reconciled, and they were joined by Neidhart, Smith, and Brian Pillman (Pillman was not related, but had trained with the Hart family and was a friend of the family). At the In Your House: Canadian Stampede pay-per-view in Calgary on July 6, 1997, the Hart Foundation won a five-on-five match against "Stone Cold" Steve Austin, Ken Shamrock, Goldust, and the Legion of Doom (Hawk and Animal). Bret Hart left the WWF in 1997 after what has come to be known as the Montreal Screwjob, while Owen died as the result of a failed stunt during his ring entrance at the Over the Edge 1999 pay-per-view. Bret would eventually return to the renamed WWE in 2010 after settling his differences with the promotion.

Three of Stu and Helen Hart's grandchildren have begun careers in professional wrestling. Nattie Neidhart, daughter of Ellie and Jim, trained in Calgary and now wrestles for World Wrestling Entertainment (formerly the WWF) under the ring name Natalya. She was the first female from the Hart family to win a championship gold, when she won the Divas Championship at Survivor Series 2010. Natalya would go on to have one of the most prolific careers of any female in WWE history, having the most matches of any female in WWE history, along with an on-going 15-year tenure, the longest of any active female wrestler in WWE. Harry Smith, son of Diana and Davey Boy Smith, currently uses the name Davey Boy Smith Jr. and also wrestled for WWE, under the name David Hart Smith. Teddy Hart, son of Georgia Hart and B. J. Annis, has also competed in WWE, but was released by the company.

In the mid and late 90s Harry Smith, T.J. Wilson, Teddy and his brother Matthew were all training together. Matthew would later wrestle shortly together with Wilson, Smith and his brother before dying of a flesh eating disease in 1996.

Two of Bruce Hart's sons Bruce Jr and Torrin have been involved in pro wrestling. Torrin began wrestling when he was 17 years old.

Two of Smith Hart's sons, Mike and Matt Herweg have started a career in wrestling. They perform under the names Matt Hart and Mike Hart, using their father's surname. Matt gained his first championship on December 15, 2017, for the Real Canadian Wrestling promotion.

Both of Alison's daughters, Lindsay and Brooke have had relationships with wrestlers, Lindsay with Randy Myers and Brooke with Peter Minnema better known under his ring name "Pistol" Pete Wilson. Brooke and Peter Minnema are now married since 2014. Minnema was trained in by the Hart family and has appeared for the Hart Legacy promotion.

Alexandra Sabina "Beans" Hart was at one point training to become a wrestler, hoping to eventually join her cousin Natalya as a WWE Diva.

== Outside wrestling ==
Helen Smith Hart was the daughter of noted marathoner and sprinter Harry J. Smith, finished 17th in the 1912 Olympic marathon and married a Greek woman, Elizabeth "Ellie" Poulis Smith

In December 2011, Jade Hart, the eldest child of Bret Hart, launched a clothing line called Jade Hart Kimonos. Based out of Calgary the clothing line consisted of handmade kimono made from Canadian silks and other fabrics. The business suspended operations in 2013.

Georgia Hart Annis is an employee at the Cookbook Co. in Calgary. She at one point helped her niece Jennifer Neidhart to get a job there too and Neidhart is now manager of catering for the Cookbook Co.

Brit and her husband Jamie are also involved in the restaurant business, they both work for the Rouge restaurant in Calgary.

Georgia Smith is a model and voice over actress and her fiancé Adam Barry is a musician.

Farrah Hart is a clothes designer.

=== Wrestling related ===
B. J. Annis, husband of Georgia Hart and father of Teddy Hart has operated BJ's Gym in Downtown East Village, Calgary since constructing it in 1971. The gym was a place for Stampede Wrestling's workers to train. In November 2011, his daughter Angie Annis staged an art exhibition at the gymnasium prior to the establishment closing its doors.

Lindsay Hart, named after her maternal uncle Ross Lindsay, is daughter of Alison Hart and Ben Bassarab, works as a make up artist and has worked on her cousin Natalie Neidhart on the reality show Total Divas, as well as working backstage for Elite Canadian Championship Wrestling. Natalya and her husband Tyson Kidd are featured heavily on Total Divas. Family members including Bret, his wife Stephanie, Ellie, Jim and Jennifer Neidhart as well as Kristen, Lachlan and Maddox Culbreth have all appeared on occasion.

== DVD ==
Hart & Soul: The Hart Family Anthology is a documentary produced and released by WWE Home Video in collaboration with Hart family members. The DVD chronicles the lineage of the Hart family beginning with the biography of patriarch Stu Hart. It gives a brief accounting of the lives of all twelve Hart children as well as parents Stu and Helen growing up in Calgary. It describes the deaths of Stu, Helen, Dean, Matthew, Owen, Brian Pillman, and Davey Boy Smith with recollections from their loved ones. The DVD concludes with a feature on the Hart Dynasty and their future in WWE. The bonus discs feature matches from Stampede Wrestling and WWF/WWE as well as candid home footage and interviews from the Hart family.

== Family tree ==
Stewart Hart^{†} | Helen Smith^{†}
Bruce Hart | Ellie Hart | Bret Hart | Dean Hart^{†} | Diana Hart | Owen Hart^{†}
Andrea Hart^{†} | James Neidhart^{†} | Julie Smadu (Divorced) | David Smith (Davey Boy Smith)^{†} (Divorced) | Martha Hart
Jennifer Neidhart | Jade Hart | Harry Smith (Davey Boy Smith Jr.) | Oje Hart
Kristen Neidhart | Dallas Hart | Georgia Smith | Athena Hart
Natalie Neidhart (Natalya) | Alexandra Hart
Theodore Wilson (Tyson Kidd) | Blade Hart
Smith Hart^{†} | Keith Hart | Wayne Hart | Georgia Hart | Alison Hart | Ross Hart
Bradley Annis (B. J. Annis) | Benjamin Bassarab (Divorced)
Edward Annis (Teddy Hart) | Matthew Annis^{†} | Annie Annis | Angela Annis | Lindsay Hart | Brooke Hart
Bradley Annis

^{†} = deceased

== Accolades and honours ==
- Calgary Awards (Signature Award, 1999)

== Championships and accomplishments ==
As a family

- Canadian Wrestling Hall of Fame
  - Class of 2001
- Prairie Wrestling Alliance Hall of Fame
  - Class of 2010
- KocoSports Combat Sports Hall of Fame
  - Class of 2012

Individual

- Stu Hart
  - Championships and accomplishments
- Smith Hart
  - Championships and accomplishments
- Bruce Hart
  - Championships and accomplishments
- Keith Hart
  - Championships and accomplishments
- Dean Hart
  - Championships and accomplishments
- Bret Hart
  - Championships and accomplishments
- Ross Hart
  - Championships and accomplishments
- Diana Hart
  - Championships and accomplishments
- Owen Hart
  - Championships and accomplishments
- Teddy Hart
  - Championships and accomplishments
- Natalya Neidhart
  - Championships and accomplishments
- Davey Boy Smith Jr.
  - Championships and accomplishments
- Matt Hart
  - Championships and accomplishments

== See also ==
- List of family relations in professional wrestling

== Sources ==
- McCoy, Heath (2007). Pain and Passion: The History of Stampede Wrestling. ECWPress. ISBN 978-1-55490-299-6. ISBN 978-1-55022-787-1
- Davies, Ross (2001). Bret Hart. Rosen Publishing Group. ISBN 0-8239-3494-2.
- Erb, Marsha (2002). Stu Hart: Lord of the ring. ECWPress. ISBN 1-55022-508-1.
