= Donald Stuart =

Donald Stuart may refer to:

- Donald Stuart (minister) (1819–1894), New Zealand Presbyterian minister and educationalist
- Donald Stuart (Australian author) (1913–1983), Australian novelist
- Donald Stuart, pen name of English author Gerald Verner (1897–1980)

== See also ==
- Don A. Stuart, pen name of American author John W. Campbell (1910–1971)
- Donald Stewart (disambiguation)
