= Dean Hart =

Canadian professional wrestler, amateur wrestler and referee (1954-1990)

Personal information
- Born: Dean Harry Anthony Hart; January 3, 1954 Calgary, Alberta, Canada
- Died: November 21, 1990 (aged 36) Calgary, Alberta, Canada
- Children: 1
- Family: Hart

Professional wrestling career
- Billed height: 6 ft 0 in (1.83 m)
- Billed weight: 190 lb (86 kg)
- Billed from: Calgary, Alberta, Canada
- Trained by: Stu Hart
- Debut: 1973
- Retired: 1989

Dean Harry Anthony Hart (January 3, 1954 – November 21, 1990) was a Canadian–American amateur wrestler, professional wrestler, referee, wrestling as well as music promoter and member of the Hart family who wrestled in Canadian regional promotions during the 1970s and 1980s, most notably in the Calgary-based Stampede Wrestling.

He was the son of Stu and Helen Hart and the younger brother of Smith, Bruce, Keith and Wayne, as well as older brother of Ellie, Georgia, Bret, Alison, Ross, Diana and Owen Hart. Dean was widely regarded as the most handsome of the Hart brothers. He died at the age of 36 in 1990, from a heart attack induced by kidney failure.

== Early life ==
He was of Greek descent through his maternal grandmother and Irish through his maternal grandfather. His father was mainly of Scots-Irish descent but also had Scottish and English ancestry. Hart was a dual citizen of Canada and the United States thanks to his mother Helen, who was born in New York.

He was nicknamed Bizz (or Biz) by his siblings. His sister Diana has claimed that it was because he was always so busy with working on something, but his brother Bret said in his autobiography that it was because he was always up to some mischievous business. As a child he once accidentally started a fire in the Hart House while playing in the top floor.

Hart was the first of his siblings to win an amateur wrestling championship at high school.

== Professional wrestling career ==
=== Stampede Wrestling and Amarillo ===
Born to Stu and Helen Hart, Dean Hart began wrestling in his father's Stampede Wrestling promotion along with younger brothers Bret and Owen Hart during the 1970s. Dean was widely regarded as the most handsome of Stu Hart's sons. He also helped out behind the scenes for Stampede later on but remained mostly preoccupied with other endeavours in the 80s. Hart worked together with his brothers Bret and Bruce in Dory Funk's Amarillo wrestling promotion in Texas in the very early 70s.

They were invited to travel to Amarillo due to the fact that they and Funk had become very good friends. The three of them traveled there alone and Bruce Hart described the journey as something akin to Stand By Me as they ran into several misadventures along the way, including getting chased by people who mistook them for hippies due to their long hair.

Dean regularly filled in as a referee for his older brother Wayne when Wayne was sick. Dean portrayed his character as a less traditional sympathetic light than Wayne, being more a competent, strict and fair judge as opposed to a heroic one, to differentiate their characters more, as Wayne was Stampede's main "babyface" referee.

On one occasion in 1988, Hart was forced to judge a match alone without a partner, as Jurgen Hermann, who was meant to be the main referee of the match, was absent from the show for unknown reasons, and Wayne was out with a knee injury. It was a Stampede British Commonwealth Mid-Heavyweight Championship match between Chris Benoit and Johnny Smith. Hart ended up accidentally botching the finish of the match, leading to Benoit regaining the title from Smith. This was not meant to happen as Dean was supposed to notice that Benoit's manager had thrown in an object for him to use in the ring to cheat, but Hart did not know this part of the match as he had not been told about it so he failed to disqualify him, and Benoit won the title. This resulted in the promotion having to issue a rematch on 6/24 in Calgary.

=== National Wrestling Alliance, Hawaii ===
Hart vacationed many times and lived in Hawaii for lengthy times and befriended many wrestlers there, among them Prince Sui who later worked for his Stampede Wrestling on recommendation from Hart. Hart was also later associated with Lia Maivia and Peter Maivia's Hawaii promotion, which was under the National Wrestling Alliance. While in Hawaii he became close to Maivia's grandson Dwayne Johnson (later known under the ringname The Rock). Despite this he remained one of the Hart children with the least involvement with the wrestling business.

== Music promoting ==
Hart began promoting music shows at a very young age and held the first ever outdoors concert in Calgary when he was nineteen years old; the event was called Fantasy Park and featured people such as Charlie Rich and comedian Billie Holiday as well as model Barbi Benton as a special guest.

Hart regularly promoted music concerts in Clearwater Beach, which was owned by his father. He booked musical acts such as The Doors and Joe Cocker. Some time during the 80s he and his brother Bruce booked the band Iron Butterfly to perform on the beach this proved lead to difficulties when some of the band members got intoxicated.

Some of Hart's rock concerts on the beach ended up being mismanaged and did not turn a profit. This led to payment issues and resulted in the area being burned down.

== Personal life ==
At some point in the early 1980s Hart, perhaps unwittingly, got involved in the "Samoan mafia", he helped transport some boxes which contained weapons. Later, the gangsters threatened Hart's life since they believed that he would testify against them in court when they were facing murder charges. Hart had a child with his girlfriend Tammy.

== Death ==
Hart suffered serious injuries in 1978 when struck by a city bus. The accident severely damaged his kidneys. He told his family very little of the accident. Diagnosed with Bright's disease during the late 1980s, he died of a heart attack on November 21, 1990, at the Hart family mansion. He was cremated.

Dean's death had a severe effect on his brother Bret, making him extremely distraught as he felt that they had grown apart too much in their later years. He was unsatisfied with how their last interactions had ended up, leaving him feeling like their relationship never got to recover like he wanted, and that in difference from their younger brother Owen, who died in 1999, affected things between them that could have been said and sorted out, but never were. Bret was also never offered time off by WWF or Vince McMahon, and he wrestled the next day.

Family friend and fellow wrestler Dory Funk Jr. was also very affected, stating that he felt like he had lost one of his own children since their families had always been so close.

Dean was the first of the Hart family to suffer an early death. Dean's death shook the family's feeling of aplomb and the sense of invincibility that they had developed as a tight knit group, semi-isolated from mainstream society outside of the wrestling business. His sister, Diana Hart, stated in her book that had any members of the Hart family been tested as a compatible donor, a kidney transplant might have saved his life. However, this option was never properly discussed by the family. His brother Bret has stated that the family was aware of the possibility of a transplant but that Dean had not been following the doctor's instruction about his diet and not done his daily dialysis as he had been told. This resulted in Dean dying unexpectedly at home before he could be taken to the hospital by their father.

== Legacy ==
His death was the day before the WWF Survivor Series that year, and commentator Roddy Piper stated that Bret dedicated his match to Dean. Bret stated in a 2015 Sports Illustrated interview that the match felt important to him despite him losing it.

I lost to [Ted] DiBiase at the end, but we had a nice little sequence there before we went into the finish and he beat me. I remember that being a salute to my brother Dean, a tribute to him. That match always had meaning to me.

Hart's older brother Smith named two of his sons (Chad and Matt) Dean in middle name in honour of him. His sister Diana dedicated a chapter in her book Under the Mat, named "Dean", to him. There is also a tribute video to Hart in his brother Bret's DVD documentary Bret "Hit Man" Hart: The Best There Is, the Best There Was, the Best There Ever Will Be. A segment on the Hart family DVD Hart & Soul: The Hart Family Anthology released by WWE is called "A letter from Dean" and focuses on his life and death.

== Championships and accomplishments ==
=== Amateur wrestling ===
- Ernest Manning High School amateur wrestling championship.

=== Professional wrestling ===
- NWA Mid-Pacific Promotions
  - NWA Hawaii Tag Team Championship (1 time) - with Steve Strong
- Stampede Wrestling
  - Stampede British Commonwealth Heavyweight Championship (2 times)
- Canadian Wrestling Hall of Fame
  - Class of 2001
- Prairie Wrestling Alliance
  - Prairie Wrestling Alliance Hall of Fame (Class of 2010)

== See also ==
- List of premature professional wrestling deaths
