= Owen Hart =

Canadian-American wrestler (1965–1999)

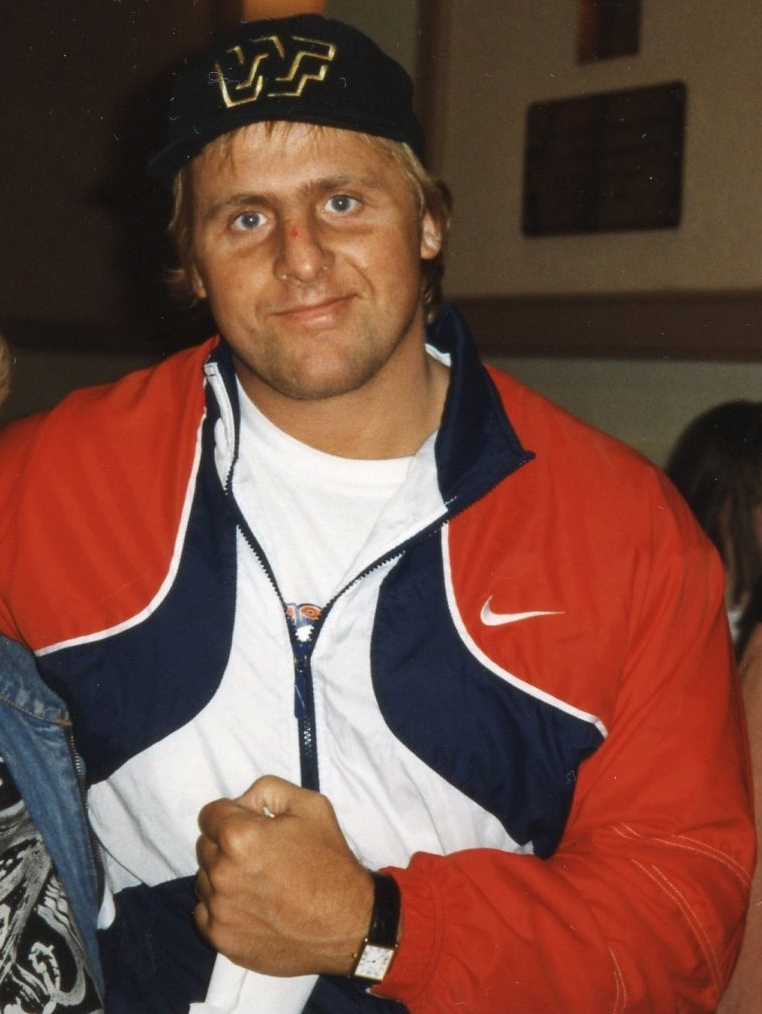
- Hart in 1998

Personal information
- Born: Owen James Hart; May 7, 1965 Calgary, Alberta, Canada
- Died: May 23, 1999 (aged 34) Kemper Arena, Kansas City, Missouri, U.S.
- Cause of death: Internal bleeding from traumatic aortic rupture caused by blunt force trauma sustained from a high fall
- Spouse: Martha Hart (née Patterson) (m. 1989)
- Children: 2
- Family: Hart

Professional wrestling career
- Ring name(s): The Rocket; The Blue Angel; The Blue Blazer; Owen Hart; Owen James; The Avenger
- Billed height: 5 ft 10 in (178 cm)
- Billed weight: 227 lb (103 kg)
- Billed from: Calgary, Alberta, Canada
- Trained by: Stu Hart
- Debut: January 8, 1983

Owen James Hart (May 7, 1965 – May 23, 1999) was a Canadian-American professional wrestler who worked for several promotions including Stampede Wrestling, New Japan Pro-Wrestling (NJPW), World Championship Wrestling (WCW), and the World Wrestling Federation (WWF). He received most of his success in the WWF, where he wrestled under both his own name and the ring names The Blue Angel and The Blue Blazer.

A member of the Hart wrestling family, he was born in Calgary, Alberta, the youngest of twelve children of Stampede Wrestling promoters Stu Hart and Helen Hart. Among other accolades, Hart was a one-time USWA Unified World Heavyweight Champion, a two-time WWF Intercontinental Champion, a one-time WWF European Champion, and a four-time WWF World Tag Team Champion, as well as the 1994 King of the Ring. He headlined three pay-per-view events for the WWF.

Hart died on May 23, 1999, during WWF's Over the Edge pay-per-view. During his entrance from the rafters of Kemper Arena in Kansas City, Missouri, United States, the equipment that was lowering him to the ring malfunctioned and he fell to his death in front of a live audience.

== Early life ==
Owen was born on May 7, 1965, in Calgary, Alberta the youngest of 12 children to Canadian-born father Stu and American-born mother Helen Hart of the Hart wrestling family. His siblings included Smith, Bruce, Keith, Dean, Bret, Ross and Diana.

Hart's family background was Greek descent through his maternal grandmother and Irish through his maternal grandfather. His father was mainly of Scots-Irish descent, but also had Scottish and German ancestry.

Hart maintained dual American-Canadian citizenship.

== Professional wrestling career ==
=== Early career (1983–1987) ===
Hart first gained wrestling experience in the amateur wrestling division at high school, through which he met his wife, Martha. Hart continued amateur wrestling for the Dinos at the University of Calgary. He placed 4th at the 1984 Canada West championships in the 76 kg weight class. Wrestling was not Hart's first choice for a career; as Martha explained in her book Broken Harts, Owen tried numerous times to find a profitable living outside of wrestling. Owen is quoted as saying, in the WWE Home Video "Owen Hart of Gold" that "during his time in the University, he wrestled incognito (under a mask) as the original British Bulldog. Then, after he graduated from the University, he wrestled as "Bronco" Owen Hart at Royal Albert Hall in London, England. As those attempts were unsuccessful, Hart was trained in his father's Hart Dungeon and worked for his father's federation, Stampede Wrestling and wrestled in England for Max Crabtree's Joint Promotions in matches that got broadcast on ITV's World of Sport and the later standalone wrestling program including a 1987 loss to former champion Marty Jones for the vacant World Mid-Heavyweight Championship.

In August 1986, Hart teamed with his brother-in-law, Ben Bassarab, to win his first title, the Stampede Wrestling International Tag Team Championship, from the Masters of Disaster (Duke Myers and Kerry Brown). They held the titles until October 1986, when they lost to the Viet Cong Express. In October 1986, Hart defeated Les Thornton for the British Commonwealth Mid-Heavyweight Championship. In January 1987, Hart briefly became a double champion by defeating Makhan Singh for the Stampede Wrestling North American Heavyweight Championship; he lost the title back to Singh later that month. In April 1987, Hart won the title back from Singh; he lost it back to Singh the following month. In August 1987, Hart lost his British Commonwealth Mid-Heavyweight Championship to Gama Singh. Hart received Pro Wrestling Illustrated's Rookie of the Year Award for 1987.

=== New Japan Pro-Wrestling (1987–1988) ===
Hart had worked with Japanese wrestler Hiroshi Hase during Hase's foray to Stampede Wrestling in 1986-1987, leading to Hart receiving publicity from the Japan wrestling media. Following lobbying from Hase, in August-September 1987, Hart made his first appearances in Japan for New Japan Pro-Wrestling (NJPW) as part of its "Sengoku Battle Series". In his debut bout, he and Mark Rocco lost to Keiichi Yamada and Keiji Muto in Tokyo's Korakuen Hall. During the tour, he primarily teamed with Rocco or Dick Murdoch. On September 17, he unsuccessfully challenged IWGP Junior Heavyweight Champion Kuniaki Kobayashi. Unlike many other gaijin wrestlers, Hart exclusively wrestled as a babyface in NJPW.

Hart returned to NJPW in January-February 1988 to compete in the inaugural Top of the Super Juniors round-robin tournament during its "New Year Golden Series". He placed fourth out of 12 wrestlers with 39 points. In May-June 1988, he returned to NJPW to take part in the "IWGP Champion Series". On May 27, 1988, he defeated Hiroshi Hase in Sendai to win the IWGP Junior Heavyweight Championship; the win made him the first non-Japanese wrestler to win the title. Following a single successful defence against Keiichi Yamada, he lost the title to Shiro Koshinaka on June 24 in Osaka Prefectural Gymnasium. In his final match of the tour, he defeated Yamada by disqualification in the Nagoya Rainbow Hall in front of more than 10,000 spectators.

=== World Wrestling Federation (1988–1989) ===
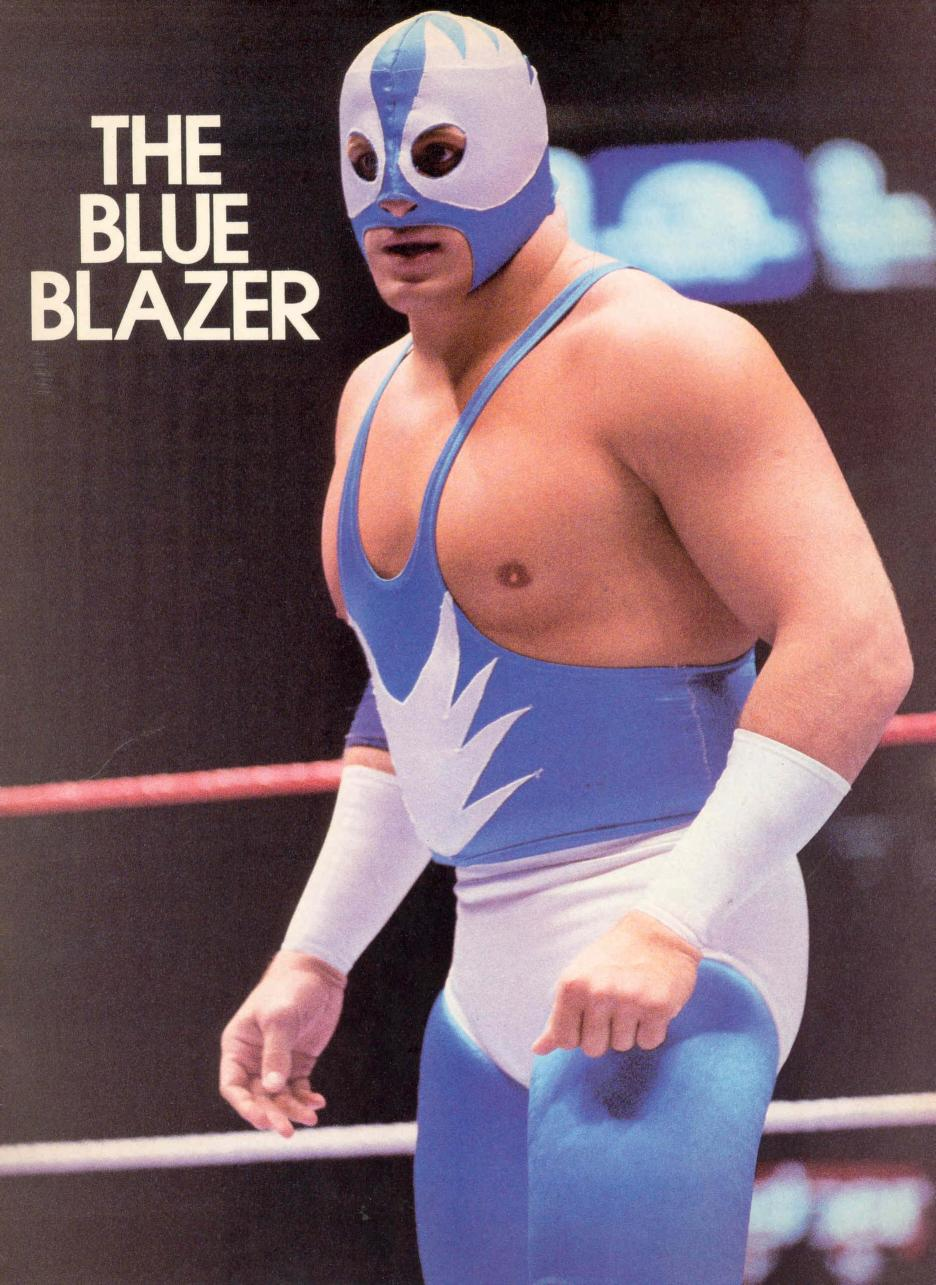
Hart as the Blue Blazer in 1989

Hart's success in New Japan Pro-Wrestling and Stampede Wrestling's working relationship with the World Wrestling Federation led to Hart signing with the company in the summer of 1988, following a pair of dark matches in March 1988. Instead of promoting Owen as Bret Hart's younger brother, the WWF decided to create a masked "superhero" type gimmick for him which played to his high-flying style. In July 1988, he began wrestling for the WWF as "the Blue Angel", with his early appearances seeing him defeat the likes of Terry Gibbs, Steve Lombardi, and Barry Horowitz. In August 1988, his ring name was tweaked to "the Blue Blazer".

The Blue Blazer made his pay-per-view debut at Survivor Series '88, teaming with Ultimate Warrior, Brutus Beefcake, Jim Brunzell, and Sam Houston against The Honky Tonk Man, Greg Valentine, Outlaw Ron Bass, Bad News Brown, and Dangerous Danny Davis. The Blazer was eliminated by Valentine, but his team went on to win the match. He continued to wrestle in the midcard, defeating enhancement talent but often falling short against other name talent; he lost to Ted DiBiase on the March 11, 1989 Saturday Night's Main Event XX and was defeated by Mr. Perfect at WrestleMania V.

Hart left the WWF in June 1989.

=== Stampede Wrestling (1989) ===
Hart returned to Stampede Wrestling in July 1989, swiftly beginning a feud with Stampede Wrestling North American Heavyweight Champion Larry Cameron and vying with opponents including Dynamite Kid, Gama Singh, and Johnny Smith. He remained with the promotion until it closed down in December 1989.

=== Return to NJPW (1989–1991) ===
Hart returned to New Japan Pro-Wrestling for a fourth tour of Japan in August-September 1989 as part of its "Bloody Fight Series". Teaming with Pat Tanaka, he took part in the #1 Contender's League round-robin tournament to determine the number one contenders to the IWGP Tag Team Championship. Hart and Tanaka placed sixth out of seven teams. On his final night of the tour, Hart unsuccessfully challenged IWGP Junior Heavyweight Champion Naoki Sano.

In January 1990, Hart returned to NJPW for a sixth tour as part of its "New Spring Gold Series", taking part in a tournament to determine the number one contenders to the IWGP Junior Heavyweight Championship. Hart defeated Black Tiger and Hiro Saito before losing to eventual winner Jushin Thunder Liger. He returned in June-July 1990 as part of NJPW's "Burning Wave" series; during this tour, he lost to Pegasus Kid at the "New Kokugikan Densetsu ~ New Japan Pro Wrestling Explosion" event in Tokyo's Ryōgoku Kokugikan on June 26. He returned to NJPW once more on September 30, 1990 at the Antonio Inoki 30th Anniversary Memorial Festival event in the Yokohama Arena, teaming with Miguelito Pérez in a loss to Kengo Kimura and Osamu Kido; he went on to wrestler several more matches for NJPW in October 1990 as part of its "Fighting Spirit" series.

Hart made his final tour of Japan with NJPW in April 1991 as part of its "Explosion Tour", competing in the second annual Top of the Super Juniors round-robin tournament. He placed second out of 10 competitors, with wins over wrestlers including Dave Finlay, Flying Scorpio, and Pegasus Kid and losses to wrestlers including Negro Casas and Norio Honaga. He wrestled his last match for NJPW on April 28, 1991, losing to eventual tournament winner Jushin Thunder Liger.

=== Universal Wrestling Association (1990–1991) ===
In March 1990, Hart (wrestling as "the Blue Blazer") made his debut with the Mexican Universal Wrestling Association (UWA), teaming with Enrique Vera and Villano III to defeat Black Power, El Signo, and the Killer in the Toreo de Cuatro Caminos in Naucalpan. He returned to the UWA in November 1990, unsuccessfully challenging Villano III for the WWF Light Heavyweight Championship on November 18.

Hart made a further appearance with the UWA in February 1991, teaming with El Texano and Gran Hamada to defeat Los Brazos in Mexico City. He returned once more in May 1991; on May 19, he lost to El Canek in a mascara contra mascara match in Naucalpan. As a result, Hart did not wear the Blue Blazer mask again until 1998. he made his final appearances for the UWA in September 1991, unsuccessfully challenging El Canek for the UWA World Heavyweight Championship on September 3 in Pachuca.

=== Catch Wrestling Association (1990–1991) ===
In July to August 1990, Hart wrestled in Europe for the Catch Wrestling Association (CWA) as part of its "Catch World Cup" series. In his first match, in Vienna, Austria, he teamed with Tony St. Clair to defeat Cannonball Grizzly and Fit Finlay. Over the following weeks, he faced opponents such as Salvatore Bellomo, Rambo, and Dave Taylor. In one bout, he and St. Clair lost to Texas Scott in a handicap match.

Hart returned to the CWA in September to November 1991 as part of its "World Cup" series, with his opponents including Larry Cameron, Franz Schumann, and Bruiser Mastino. On November 29, he lost to Fit Finlay in a street fight in the Stadthalle Bremen in Germany.

During his time in Europe, he also wrestled again in the UK, losing to Danny Boy Collins in Bath in November 1991 in a match for the World Middleweight championship, as well as wrestling in France on TV matches for Eurosport's New Catch program.

=== World Championship Wrestling (1991) ===
Hart debuted in World Championship Wrestling (WCW) on March 5, 1991, teaming with Ricky Morton to defeat Greg Sawyer and Joey Maggs, then defeating Keith Stark in a singles match (both bouts were recorded and broadcast on WCW Pro later that month). Later that month, he wrestled a further four matches that aired on World Championship Wrestling and World Wide Wrestling, defeating opponents including Mark Kyle, Pat Rose, and Rip Rogers. Forming a short-lived tag team with Flyin' Brian, he had a handful of matches at house shows against the Fabulous Freebirds. He made his final appearance with WCW on April 6, defeating Joe Cruz in the Greensboro Coliseum.

=== Return to WWF (1991–1999) ===
==== New Foundation; High Energy (1991–1993) ====
Hart had been engaged in contract discussions with WCW but the deal was never struck, as Owen was not willing to move himself and his family to the company's headquarters in Atlanta. Instead, he returned to the WWF in November 1991.

The popular Hart Foundation tag team, composed of Owen's brother Bret and brother-in-law Jim Neidhart, had split up; Bret set out on a singles career while Neidhart was used sparingly. When Neidhart returned from a storyline injury, he joined Owen to form a team known as the New Foundation. Owen and Neidhart first feuded with the Beverly Brothers. They then had their only pay-per-view match at the Royal Rumble in January 1992 where they beat the Orient Express. Neidhart left the WWF in February 1992.

In February 1992, Hart was paired with Koko B. Ware (whom he had previously partnered while wrestling as the Blue Blazer) to form the tag team known as "High Energy". The duo went on to continue the New Foundation's feud with the Beverly Brothers. At WrestleMania VIII in April 1992, Hart defeated Skinner. Following WrestleMania, High Energy had a series of matches against the Nasty Boys. In June 1992, they challenged WWF Tag Team Champions Money Inc. on WWF Prime Time Wrestling, winning by count out. In October 1992, while under contract to the WWF, Hart wrestled four matches for Wrestle and Romance in Japan, including losing to Último Dragón in the Nakajima Sports Center. In November 1992, High Energy began a feud with the Headshrinkers, who defeated them at Survivor Series. At the Royal Rumble in January 1993, Hart competed in the Royal Rumble match, entering at number 28 and being eliminated by the eventual winner, Yokozuna. Later that month, High Energy challenged WWF Tag Team Champions Money Inc. on WWF Wrestling Challenge, winning by disqualification. The team quietly disbanded in March 1993 following a loss to the Headshrinkers.

==== Feud with Bret Hart (1993–1995) ====
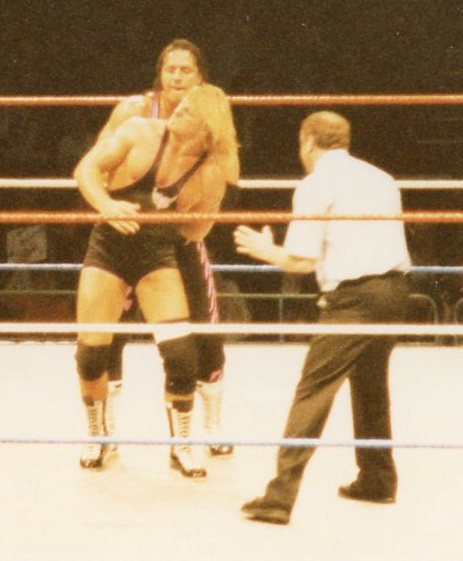
Hart's feud with his brother Bret won the Pro Wrestling Illustrated Feud of the Year award and garnered praise from the Wrestling Observer Newsletter for their steel cage match at SummerSlam

Following the disbanding of High Energy, Hart resumed his singles career. In the middle of 1993, when Bret Hart's feud with Jerry Lawler ignited, Owen stood by his brother's side and fought against Lawler in the United States Wrestling Association (USWA) where most of the WWF talent were considered the heels. At King of the Ring in June 1993, Hart unsuccessfully challenged Papa Shango for the USWA Unified World Heavyweight Championship. Later that month, at a USWA event in the Mid-South Coliseum, Hart defeated Shango for the title. He held the title until July 1993, when he lost to Jerry Lawler in the Mid-South Coliseum. At the USWA's "The Mother of All Matches" event in the Mid-South Coliseum in August 1993, the Hart Brothers defeated Lawler and Jeff Jarrett. At SummerSlam in August 1993, Hart defeated Barry Horowitz in a dark match.

Bret, along with Owen and their brothers Bruce and Keith, were scheduled to face Jerry Lawler and his team at Survivor Series. However, Lawler was unable to make it to the show, and as a result could not appear on WWF television. Lawler was replaced with Shawn Michaels. During the match Owen and Bret inadvertently crashed into each other, causing Owen to be eliminated from the team. Owen showed up after the match and had a heated confrontation with Bret, while Keith, Bruce and Stu tried to calm things down. This confrontation resulted in Owen leaving the ring to boos while his brothers and father watched in dismay and mother Helen cried at ringside. The following night Owen adopted the pink and black tights, sunglasses and Sharpshooter finisher to send a message to his brother. Owen, angry with being in Bret's shadow, challenged his brother which Bret declined. Instead, the brothers seemed to reunite by the holidays. According to Bret, the original plan was to have brother Bruce turn on Bret and have Owen leave the WWF alongside Keith, but Bret suggested that he'd feud with Owen instead.

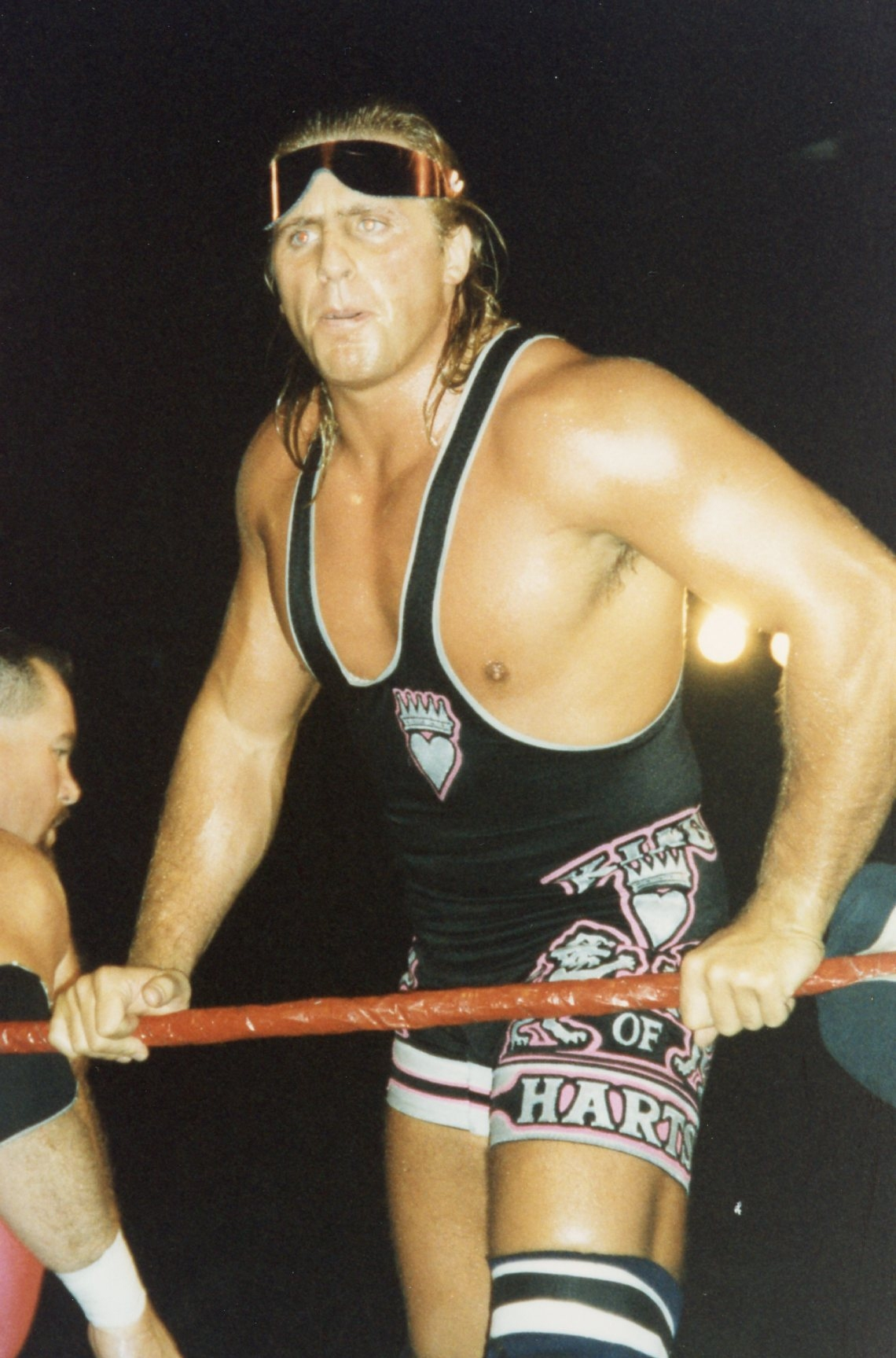
Hart adorned his attire with the nickname "the King of Harts" after winning the 1994 King of the Ring

Bret tried to make amends with Owen, teaming with him on a regular basis. Bret even secured the two a shot at the WWF Tag Team Championship. They faced the Quebecers for the title at the Royal Rumble in January 1994. Initially everything was fine between the brothers, but when Bret hurt his knee (kayfabe) and was unable to tag Owen in for a long period of time, the younger Hart got frustrated. When the referee stopped the match due to Bret's damaged knee, Owen snapped; he kicked his brother's leg and then walked off, berating Bret on the Titantron shortly after as Bret was being helped backstage. This started his run as a heel. After the act, an infuriated Owen accused his brother of being selfish and holding him down. Owen admitted that it felt good to take out his brother. Later that evening, Hart entered the Royal Rumble match, but was swiftly eliminated by Diesel. The two brothers faced off for the first time at WrestleMania X, where Owen cleanly pinned his older brother. Later in the evening, Bret won the WWF Championship against Yokozuna while Owen stood by and watched in anger and jealousy as Bret celebrated in the ring. In June 1994, Owen won the 1994 King of the Ring tournament turning back Razor Ramon in the finals with an elbow drop to the back and with an assist from Jim Neidhart. After the victory, Owen dropped "The Rocket" nickname and took the nickname "The King of Harts."

Owen and Bret feuded throughout the summer of 1994, clashing many times both in singles and later in tag team matches (with Bret joined by the returning British Bulldog). Two prominent matches took place in this feud: first, their steel cage match in the co-main event of SummerSlam for Bret's WWF Championship, which Bret won. This match later received a five-star rating from Dave Meltzer. The second was a lumberjack match on August 17 that Owen initially won and was announced as WWF Champion; Bret won the match after it was ordered to continue due to interference. At the Survivor Series, Owen struck the most damaging blow against his brother as he conned his own mother Helen to throw in the towel for Bret. The ploy cost Bret the WWF Championship to Bob Backlund. At the same event, Hart teamed with Diesel, Jeff Jarrett, Jim Neidhart, and Shawn Michaels as "the Teamsters" in a loss to "the Bad Guys" (Fatu, Razor Ramon, Sione, 1-2-3 Kid, and British Bulldog). Owen also prevented Bret from regaining the WWF Championship at the Royal Rumble in January 1995 when he interfered in the match between Bret and new champion Diesel. Later that evening, he entered the Royal Rumble match, but was eliminated by British Bulldog. In the weeks after the Royal Rumble, Bret and Owen clashed again with Bret soundly defeating his brother, thus putting an end to their feud for the time being.

==== Camp Cornette; Tag Team Champion (1995–1997) ====
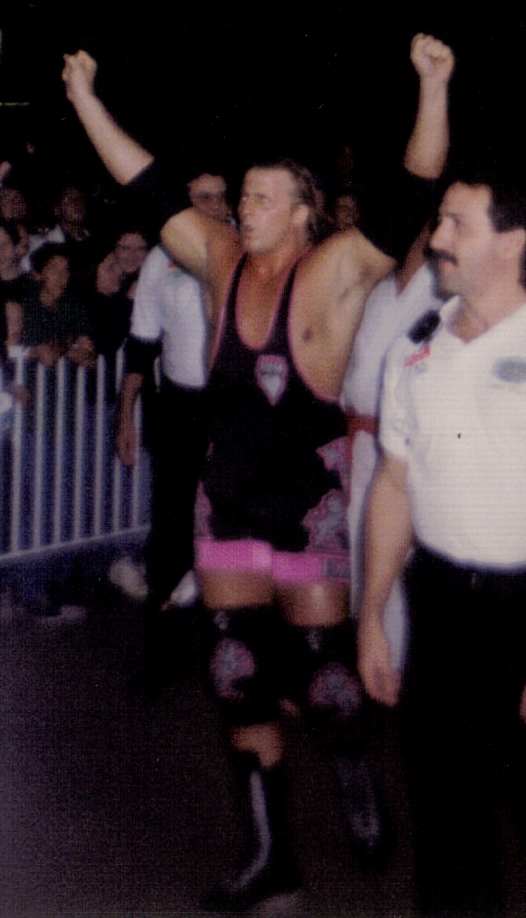
Hart making his entrance to the ring in 1995.

Owen rebounded from the loss to Bret by winning the WWF Tag Team Championship from The Smoking Gunns at WrestleMania XI. Owen, who was joined by a "Mystery Partner", had challenged the Gunns to a title match; the partner turned out to be former world champion Yokozuna. After the victory Owen took Jim Cornette and Mr. Fuji as his managers, who already managed Yokozuna. The team defended the title for five months until they lost them to Shawn Michaels and Diesel at In Your House 3. They would briefly hold the title a second time when the belts were handed back to them before the Smoking Gunns regained the title. Owen and Yokozuna would continue to team off and on until the end of the year.

In 1995, Owen's brother-in-law Davey Boy Smith turned heel and joined the Camp Cornette stable. During the summer of 1996 the two brothers in law started to team up more and more, sometimes alongside Vader who was also a member of Camp Cornette. Owen also won a Slammy Award for injuring Shawn Michaels and began using the nickname "Slammy Award Winner" and the "King of Harts," though this nickname was rarely used. Owen was also a color commentator for the 1996 King of the Ring (exhibiting clear partisan support for Vader and Smith) and during this time wore a cast on his right forearm for several months, feigning a nagging injury to subsequently use his cast as a weapon during his matches.

In September 1996, Bulldog and Hart earned a pay-per-view shot at the tag team titles at In Your House 10. Owen and Bulldog left with the gold after defeating the Smoking Gunns. They also left with a new manager as Clarence Mason had conned Jim Cornette into signing over the contracts of the new champions. Signs of dissension, however, slowly started to show. One occasion where this was evident was at the Royal Rumble when Hart accidentally eliminated Bulldog. After the Rumble, they had miscommunication in matches against Doug Furnas and Phil LaFon and Bulldog fired Mason after losing a match to Crush who was also managed by Mason, something which did not sit well with Hart. Another bone of contention between the two was the newly created WWF European Championship; both men had fought their way to the finals to crown the first champion with Bulldog coming out as the victor.

After retaining the tag team title against the Headbangers by disqualification on the edition of March 24, 1997, of Monday Night Raw, the tension between the two bubbled over. An incensed Hart demanded a shot at Bulldog's European title the next week. The match was booked for March 31; on the night, the two went at it with such intensity that many thought the tag team champions had finally gone their separate ways. Then in a shocking moment, the recently turned heel Bret Hart appeared at ringside and stopped the match. Bret appealed to both Owen and Bulldog, talking about the importance of family. They agreed to put their differences aside and join with Bret to form the new Hart Foundation, an anti-American stable that also included Hart in-law Jim Neidhart and Hart family friend Brian Pillman.

==== Hart Foundation (1997) ====
After forming the Hart Foundation, Owen quickly gained singles gold of his own as he pinned Rocky Maivia to win his first WWF Intercontinental Championship. This meant that the Hart Foundation held every WWF title except the WWF Championship, cementing their dominance over the federation. It was not all success for Owen, though, as he and the British Bulldog lost the WWF Tag Team Championship to Stone Cold Steve Austin and Shawn Michaels on May 26, 1997. He began feuding with Austin shortly thereafter.

Owen and Bulldog got a second chance at regaining the tag team titles after Michaels vacated his half of the championship due to an injury. On the edition of July 14, 1997, of Raw the two entered a tournament and won to face Austin and a partner of his choice that evening for the vacant titles. That partner turned out to be Dude Love, who declared himself to be Austin's partner and helped him defeat Hart and Bulldog for the tag team championship.

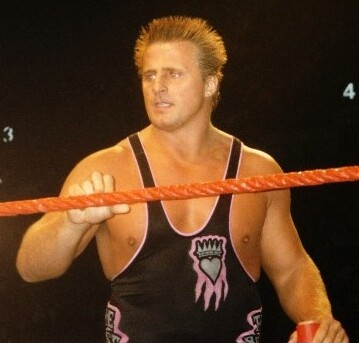
Hart in September 1997

At SummerSlam in August, Hart was to defend his Intercontinental Championship against Austin in a "Kiss My Ass" match, where Hart put the title up against Austin having to kiss his buttocks if he lost. During the match, Hart botched a piledriver and dropped Austin on the top of his head, injuring his neck. Austin won the title from Hart that evening, but due to the injury was forced to vacate the title. Although the entire situation was an accident, the WWF decided to make it part of the storyline as Owen began wearing a T-shirt patterned after Austin's that read "Owen 3:16/I Just Broke Your Neck".

Hart was then entered into a tournament to crown a new Intercontinental Champion and reached the finals, being set to face Faarooq at Badd Blood: In Your House. Owen beat Faarooq with Austin's help. Afterward, Austin explained that he wanted to beat Hart for the title when he returned and would not allow Faarooq or anyone else to beat him. After Hart retained the title twice by disqualification between Bad Blood and Survivor Series in Montreal, Austin got his wish and defeated Hart for the Intercontinental Championship again. Later that night, the Montreal Screwjob took place. Bret left the WWF after Survivor Series and both the British Bulldog and Jim Neidhart were granted quick releases from their contracts to jump to WCW. This left Owen as the only Hart family member remaining in the WWF, due to his contractual obligations.

==== The Black Hart; Nation of Domination (1997–1998) ====
Hart was not seen or mentioned on WWF programming until he made a surprise appearance after Shawn Michaels retained his title following a disqualification loss to Ken Shamrock at In Your House: D-Generation X where he attacked Shawn Michaels. Now a fan favorite, but with a new edgy, antisocial attitude, Hart became known as "the Lone Hart" and "the Black Hart". Owen had a feud with D-Generation X (DX) and challenged Shawn Michaels for the WWF Championship on the December 29, 1997, episode of Raw Is War: Hart had Michaels locked in the Sharpshooter when Triple H interfered in order to save Michaels' title, giving Hart the victory by disqualification.

On January 20, 1998, Hart won the European title from Triple H, although not directly. Goldust dressed up as Triple H in an attempt to swerve Hart, but WWF Commissioner Sgt. Slaughter considered him to be a legitimate replacement. On March 16, 1998, Hart suffered a kayfabe ankle injury during a match against Barry Windham involving Triple H. When Hart joined the commentary at ringside, Triple H managed to draw Owen into an impromptu title match and regained the title. Chyna interfered while the referee was not looking and while Triple H was distracting the referee, she struck Hart behind the left knee with a baseball bat, picked him up and threw him back into the ring where Triple H put Hart in a reverse ankle lock to his injured right ankle to win the European Championship under referees discretion in controversial fashion. Hart challenged Triple H at WrestleMania XIV on March 29 and at Unforgiven: In Your House on April 26, but was unable to regain the title.

Following WrestleMania, Hart had allied with Ken Shamrock against the Nation of Domination. On April 27, 1998, during a tag team match with Shamrock against Nation members Mark Henry and Rocky Maivia, Hart turned on Shamrock, "snapping" his ankle and "biting his ear" in the process, and becoming a heel once again. After the attack on Shamrock, Hart became the co-leader, with The Rock, of the Nation of Domination, claiming that "Enough is enough and it's time for a change". The Nation's first big feud after Hart joined was against D-Generation X. It was during this feud that D-Generation X parodied the Nation of Domination. The imitation was complete with an actor dressing up as Hart and uttering the phrase "I am not a nugget"; this was in response to Shawn Michaels referring to Owen as a nugget of faeces in a toilet bowl that, no matter how many times Michaels flushed, he was unable to get rid of. "Nugget" became a derisive term that followed Hart for the rest of his career. At Over the Edge: In Your House in May 1998, the Nation of Domination (Hart, D'Lo Brown, and Kama Mustafa) defeated[D-Generation X (Billy Gunn, Road Dogg, and Triple H). At King of the Ring in June 1998, Hart lost to D-Generation X member X-Pac.

Hart's participation in the D-Generation X feud was side-tracked when Shamrock returned from injuries set on getting revenge on Hart. The two faced one another in a series of submission matches, during which time Hart quietly left the Nation of Domination. At Fully Loaded: In Your House in July 1998, Hart defeated Shamrock in a "Hart Family Dungeon match". At SummerSlam in August 1998, Shamrock defeated Hart in a Lion's Den match.

==== Teaming with Jeff Jarrett; return of the Blue Blazer (1998–1999) ====
In late-1998, Hart formed an alliance with Jeff Jarrett. Hart and Jarrett had Jarrett's manager Debra in their corner. During this time a storyline was proposed that Hart was supposed to have an on-screen affair with Debra, something which Owen turned down.

After a match in which Hart "accidentally injured" Dan Severn, Hart seemingly quit the WWF. Playing off the legitimate injury Hart had inflicted on Austin the year before, the angle blurred the lines between reality and "storyline." Yet as soon as Hart "quit," the Blue Blazer appeared in the WWF claiming to in no way be Hart despite it being very obvious who was under the mask. Unlike the first run of the character, the Blazer was now an overbearing, self-righteous heel who treated the edgy Attitude Era WWF with disdain. Hart and Jarrett ended up making the storyline comical. To prove that Hart was not the Blazer, he showed up beside the Blue Blazer, who was a masked Jarrett. In a later attempt to prove that neither Hart or Jarrett was the Blazer, they both appeared next to a man in the Blue Blazer mask; however, it was obvious that a black man was under the mask (Hart's former tag team partner Koko B. Ware). On January 25, 1999, in the midst of the Blue Blazer angle Hart and Jarrett defeated Ken Shamrock and the Big Boss Man for the WWF Tag Team Championship. The pair successfully defended the belts against Test and D'Lo Brown at WrestleMania XV. They lost the titles to the team of Kane and X-Pac on the (pre-taped) episode of Raw that aired on April 5, 1999. Afterwards, Hart and Jarrett continued to team together well into May 1999. That same month, Hart began a feud with The Godfather for the Intercontinental Championship, which was scheduled for Over the Edge.

== Personal life ==
Hart met Martha Joan Patterson in 1982. They married on July 1, 1989, and had two children together: Oje Edward Hart (born March 5, 1992) and Athena Christie Hart (born September 23, 1995).

On May 28, 2011, Hart was inducted into the Legends Pro Wrestling "Hall of Fame" by Jack Blaze in Wheeling, West Virginia at their "LPW Hart & Soul Tour" event. The award was accepted by his brother-in-law Jim Neidhart, who was also inducted that night.

== Death ==
On May 23, 1999, Hart fell to his death in Kansas City, Missouri, during the Over the Edge pay-per-view event. Hart was in the process of being lowered via harness and grapple line into the ring from the rafters of Kemper Arena for a booked Intercontinental Championship match against The Godfather. In keeping with the Blazer's new "buffoonish superhero" character, he was to begin with a dramatic entrance, being lowered to just above ring level, at which time he would act "entangled", then release himself from the safety harness and fall flat on his face for comedic effect—this necessitated the use of a quick release mechanism. It was an elaboration on a Blue Blazer stunt done previously on the Sunday Night Heat before Survivor Series in 1998. Before being lowered into the ring, the harness malfunctioned and Hart fell 78 feet (24 m), landing chest-first on the top rope (approximately a foot from the nearest turnbuckle).

Hart had performed the stunt a few times before. Hart's widow Martha has suggested that, by moving around to get comfortable with both the harness and his cape on, Hart unintentionally triggered an early release. Television viewers did not see the incident. During the fall, a pre-taped vignette was being shown on the pay-per-view broadcast as well as on the monitors in the darkened arena. Afterward, while Hart was being worked on by medical personnel inside the ring, the live event's broadcast showed only the audience. Meanwhile, WWF television announcer Jim Ross repeatedly told those watching live on pay-per-view that what had just transpired was not a wrestling angle or storyline and that Hart was hurt badly, emphasizing the seriousness of the situation. Hart was transported to Truman Medical Center in Kansas City. While several attempts to revive him were made, he died due to his injuries. The cause of death was later revealed to be internal bleeding from blunt force trauma. The impact severed his aorta, resulting in Hart bleeding to death just minutes later; he was 34 years old.

=== Aftermath ===
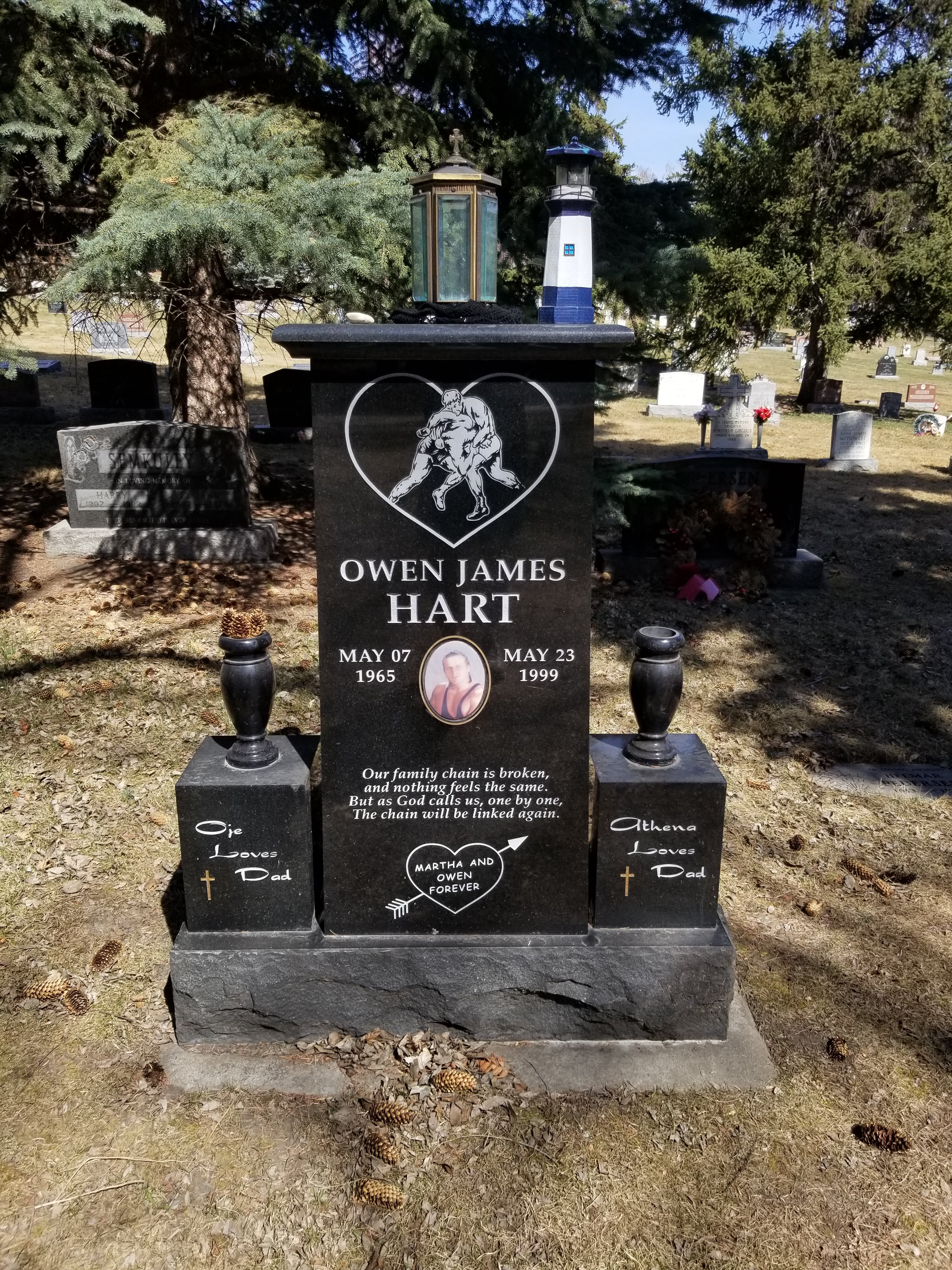
Grave of Owen Hart at Queen's Park Cemetery in Calgary, Alberta, Canada

WWF and Vince McMahon drew controversy when the company chose to continue the pay-per-view event after Jim Ross announced Owen Hart's death on the live broadcast. Over the Edge was never commercially released on WWF Home Video, although it was available on the WWE Network in 2014 for the first time since its original air date. Other than a short memorial that was added before the show began, all footage and mention of Hart was edited out.

A special episode of Raw Is War that aired on May 24, 1999, the night after Hart's death, was dubbed Raw Is Owen. It was broadcast live from the Kiel Center in St. Louis. The tribute show scored a 7.2 Nielsen rating, making it the highest-rated special episode in Raw history and the third highest-rated episode of Raw overall. The next day, WWF taped the episode of Raw for May 31, 1999. During that show, Jeff Jarrett defeated The Godfather to win the WWF Intercontinental Championship, the title Hart was booked to win for a third time at Over the Edge. Celebrating his victory, Jarrett screamed Hart's name.

On October 4, 1999, five months after Hart's death, Bret Hart faced Chris Benoit on WCW Monday Nitro in a tribute to his brother. The match took place in the same arena in which Hart had fallen to his death.

After a lawsuit that lasted over a year and a half, a settlement was reached on November 2, 2000, which saw WWF pay the estate of Owen Hart US$18 million. Hart’s estate was represented by attorney Pamela Fischer. The manufacturer of the harness system was also a defendant against the Hart family, but they were dismissed from the case after the settlement was reached. Owen Hart's widow Martha used some of the settlement to establish the Owen Hart Foundation.

In 2001, Hart's sister Diana released her first book named Under the Mat which discussed the Hart family. The book was written partially in response to Hart's death. Martha Hart pursued legal action, stating that the book was "filled with distortions, misstatements and unjustified slurs that attempt to destroy the reputation of my family and me, and undermine the memory of Owen."

In 2002, Martha wrote a book about Hart's life called Broken Harts: The Life and Death of Owen Hart.

In June 2010, Martha filed a lawsuit against WWE over its use of Hart's name and likeness as well as personal photos of Hart's family in the WWE Hart & Soul DVD, as well as the failure to make royalty payments. The matter was scheduled to go to trial in June 2013 before the settlement was reached in April 2013 for an undisclosed amount.

== Legacy ==
Fox Sports dubbed Hart a "genius".

Hart was set to be a playable character under his Blue Blazer gimmick in the video game WWF Attitude. The gimmick was subsequently removed from the game, though Hart remained a playable character. The PlayStation and Nintendo 64 versions of the game were also dedicated to him, featuring a tribute screen at the beginning that reads "Dedicated to Owen James Hart 1965 – 1999".

Hart is a playable character in Legends of Wrestling II (2002) and Showdown: Legends of Wrestling (2004), both published by Acclaim.

WWE released Owen: Hart of Gold on DVD and Blu-ray on December 7, 2015 in the United Kingdom, followed by the United States the following day.

Wrestler Kevin Owens named his son after Hart and incorporated the name into his own ring name as tribute to both of them.

On September 20, 2021, All Elite Wrestling (AEW) announced the Owen Hart Cup Tournament, in partnership with the Owen Hart Foundation, complete with a trophy called "The Owen". The company also announced production and distribution of original Owen Hart merchandise, action figures and Hart as a character in AEW's console game, AEW Fight Forever.

== Championships and accomplishments ==
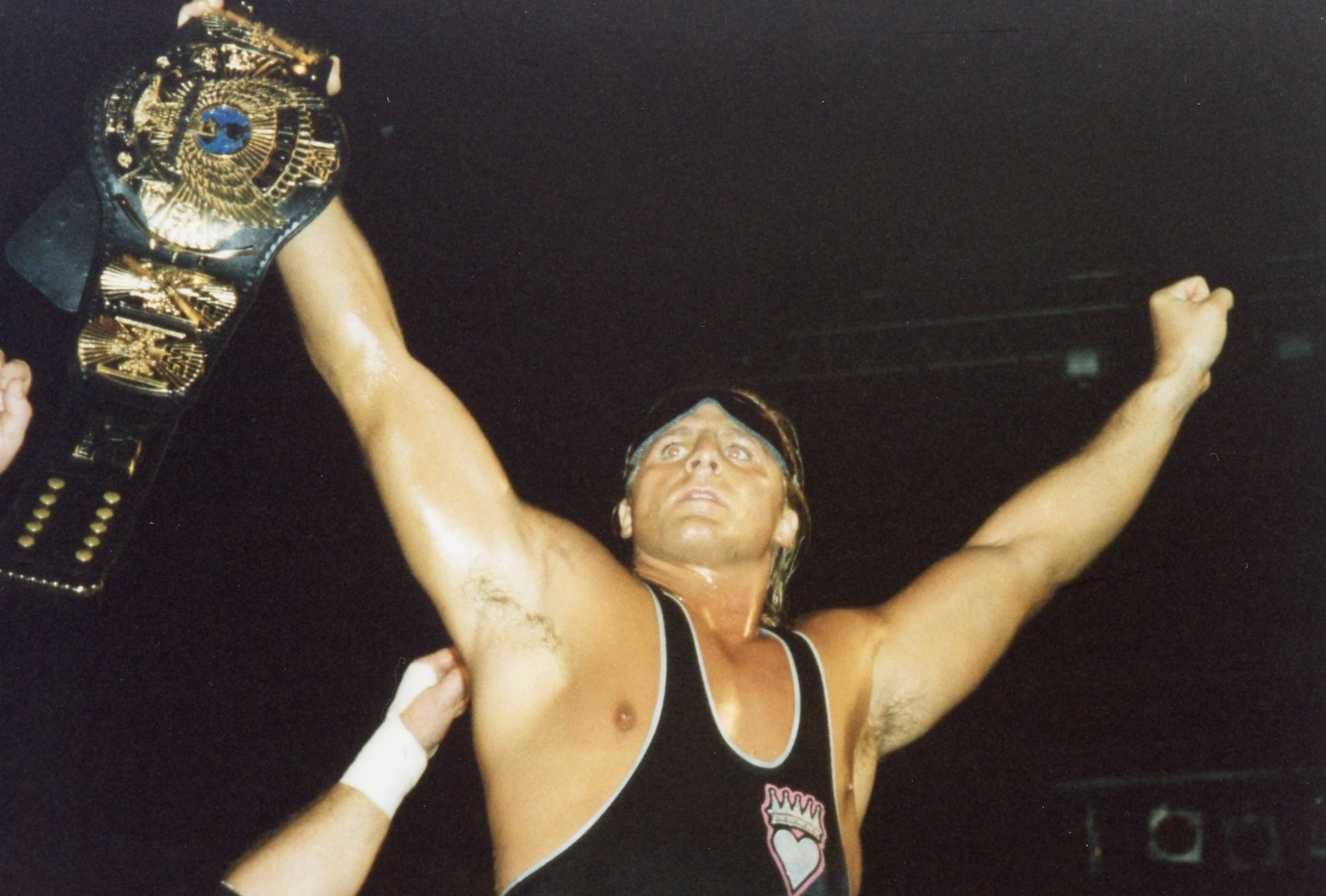
Hart won every major championship in the World Wrestling Federation, except for the WWF Championship he is seen holding here; though he did pin his brother Bret in a match for the championship at a house show in 1994, the result was quickly overturned and the reign was never officially recognized.

- George Tragos/Lou Thesz Professional Wrestling Hall of Fame
  - Class of 2018 (Posthumous Inductee)
- Legends Pro Wrestling
  - LPW Hall of Fame (Class of 2011)
- Prairie Wrestling Alliance
  - Prairie Wrestling Alliance Hall of Fame (Class of 2010)
- New Japan Pro-Wrestling
  - IWGP Junior Heavyweight Championship (1 time)
- Pro Wrestling Illustrated
  - Editor's Award (1999)
  - Feud of the Year (1994) vs. Bret Hart
  - Rookie of the Year (1987)
  - Ranked No. 10 of the top 500 singles wrestlers in the PWI 500 in 1994
  - Ranked No. 66 of the top 500 singles wrestlers of the "PWI Years" in 2003
  - Ranked No. 84 of the top 100 tag teams of the "PWI Years" in 2003 – with Davey Boy Smith
- Professional Wrestling Hall of Fame
  - Class of 2019
- Pro Wrestling This Week
  - Wrestler of the Week (July 5–11, 1987)
- Canadian Wrestling Hall of Fame
  - Individually
  - With the Hart family
- Stampede Wrestling
  - Stampede British Commonwealth Mid-Heavyweight Championship (1 time)
  - Stampede Wrestling International Tag Team Championship (1 time) – with Ben Bassarab
  - Stampede North American Heavyweight Championship (2 times)
  - Stampede Wrestling Hall of Fame (Class of 1995)
- United States Wrestling Association
  - USWA Unified World Heavyweight Championship (1 time)
- World Wrestling Federation
  - WWF European Championship (1 time)
  - WWF Intercontinental Championship (2 times)
  - WWF Tag Team Championship (4 times) – with Yokozuna (2), The British Bulldog (1) and Jeff Jarrett (1)
  - King of the Ring (1994)
  - Madison Square Garden Royal Rumble (1994)
  - WWF World Tag Team Championship Tournament (1997) – with The British Bulldog
  - WWF Intercontinental Championship Tournament (1997)
  - Slammy Award (3 times)
    - Biggest Rat (1994)
    - Squared Circle Shocker (1996) (Note: Awarded to Shawn Michaels for collapsing, but Hart accepted the award for himself for claiming to have made Michaels collapse.)
    - Best Bow Tie (1997) (Note: After he presented the Award, Hart never awarded it to any of the possible candidates and instead stole it for himself.)
- Wrestling Observer Newsletter
  - Best Flying Wrestler (1987, 1988)
  - Feud of the Year (1997) with The Hart Foundation vs. Stone Cold Steve Austin

== Luchas de Apuestas record ==
Winner (wager)	Loser (wager)	Location	Event	Date	Notes
El Canek (mask)	Blue Blazer (mask)	Naucalpan, Mexico State	UWA show	May 29, 1991	

== See also ==
- Deaths in sports
- Hart wrestling family
- List of premature professional wrestling deaths
