= Hardt (surname) =

Hardt is a German surname. Notable people with the surname include:

- Dick Hardt (born 1963), American-Canadian software executive
- Ernst Hardt (1876–1947), German author
- Heinz Hardt (1936-2025), German politician
- Jürgen Hardt (born 1963), German politician
- Karin Hardt (1910-1992), German actress
- Michael Hardt (born 1960), American philosopher
- Mickey Hardt (born 1969), German actor
- Nick Hardt (born 2000), Dominican tennis player
