= Diana Hart =

Canadian professional wrestling manager

- Born: Diana Joyce Hart; October 8, 1963 (age 62); Calgary, Alberta, Canada
- Occupation: Writer
- Spouse: Davey Boy Smith (m. 1984; div. 2000)
- Children: 2, including Davey Boy Smith Jr.
- Writing career
- Language: English
- Period: 1980s–present
- Genres: Autobiographical, romance novel
- Subject: Pro wrestling
- Notable work: Under the Mat: Inside Wrestling's Greatest Family

Diana Joyce Hart (born October 8, 1963) is a Canadian-American writer, model, valet and wrestling personality. She is the youngest daughter of Canadian wrestling promoter Stu Hart and was the second to last child born to Stu and his wife Helen. She is best known for her several appearances for Stampede Wrestling and WWE often with her brothers Bret and Owen Hart as well as her husband Davey Boy Smith, and for her book, Under the Mat.

She was also the 1997 "Mrs. Calgary Stampede".

== Early life ==
Hart is of Greek descent through her maternal grandmother and Irish through her maternal grandfather, long-distance runner Harry Smith. Her father was mainly of Ulster Scot descent but also had Scottish and English ancestry. Hart is a dual citizen of Canada and the United States thanks to her mother Helen, who was born in New York.

Hart is a member of the Hart wrestling family, growing up with eleven siblings; Smith, Bruce, Keith, Wayne, Dean, Ellie, Georgia, Bret, Alison, Ross and Owen.

== Wrestling related appearances ==
=== Stampede Wrestling ===
One of Hart's first wrestling appearances was in her father's promotion, Stampede Wrestling, in August 1989, during a heated rivalry between her husband Davey Boy Smith and his storyline brother Johnny Smith, in which her brother Owen Hart also got involved after Johnny's disrespect towards the Hart family.

She was also involved in the 1999 incarnation of Stampede Wrestling. In a storyline where she refused to put the belt around the waist of a wrestler who had insulted her family, she was then attacked but her son Harry intervened and chased the attackers off.

=== World Wrestling Federation/Entertainment ===
Hart was in attendance at SummerSlam in August 1992 where her husband won the WWF Intercontinental Championship from her brother, Bret Hart, in the night's main event at Wembley Stadium. At the end of the match, Hart embraced both her brother and her husband to signify the family's unification.

Two years later at the 1994 SummerSlam, she sat at ringside beside her husband, who had just returned to the WWF, to watch her brothers Bret and Owen wrestle each other inside a steel cage for the WWF Championship. In 1995, she accompanied her husband to the ring for his WWF Championship match against Bret at In Your House: Season's Beatings, which Davey lost.

In April 1996, the WWF began a storyline where Hart claimed that she was sexually assaulted by Shawn Michaels backstage at In Your House: Good Friends, Better Enemies in an attempt to play mind games with Michaels as her husband prepared to challenge him for the WWF Championship at In Your House: Beware of Dog. The angle culminated with an in-ring promo on an episode of Monday Night Raw where Hart slapped Michaels, leading to a brawl between Michaels and Bulldog. When their match at In Your House led to a draw, a rematch was signed for King of the Ring 1996, which the Bulldog ultimately lost. After that, the storyline was dropped.

In July 1997, Diana accompanied the Hart Foundation in their match at In Your House: Canadian Stampede, who defeated Stone Cold Steve Austin, Ken Shamrock, Goldust, and The Legion of Doom in the main event. Two months later, she was at ringside for the WWF One Night Only British pay-per-view, where her husband lost the WWF European Championship to Shawn Michaels in the main event.

She later appeared on WWE television in May 2002, when she was interviewed for a WWE Confidential piece on the recent death of her ex-husband. At WrestleMania XXVI, Hart returned as a lumberjack for the No Holds Barred Match between Bret Hart and Mr. McMahon. McMahon had paid the Hart Family to screw Bret in their match. However, the tables were turned and the Hart Family sided with Bret and helped him win the match. She also appeared at her father Stu's Hall of Fame induction in 2010 together with all her living siblings. She also appeared alongside her children to accept the posthumous Hall of Fame induction of her ex-husband as part of the class of 2020 (ceremony held in 2021).

=== Hart Legacy Wrestling ===
Hart has also worked for Hart Legacy Wrestling, which is managed by her relatives and their associates, she appeared on the first ever HLW event in 2013 together with all her living siblings except Bret and the Hopes & Ropes charity fundraiser in 2016 where she signed copies of her book Cauliflower Heart: A Romantic Wrestler. She also works with gym training for younger students and promotional work for the shows.

== Writing ==
=== Autobiography ===
After the death of her younger brother, Owen Hart, in a wrestling accident, Hart became very outspoken about the wrestling industry and wrote a controversial book entitled Under the Mat: Inside Wrestling's Greatest Family, which discussed alleged secrets of the Hart family. Owen's widow, Martha, intended to sue Hart over the book, which caused the book to be removed from publication. It was later claimed by Hart that the stories that were printed in the book were completely twisted and changed from how she had written them originally, and she was deeply hurt by the controversy that it caused her family because of it. Her brother Bret has questioned her claim that she was not aware of the book's content before publication. Hart has disowned the book and stated that she wishes it had never been written.

=== Cauliflower Heart trilogy ===
In 2015, Hart stated that she was intending to write a trilogy of romance novels. The book series is entitled Cauliflower Heart and revolves around a woman born into a wrestling family. The first book entitled Cauliflower Heart: A Romantic Wrestler, which was released in 2014. Hart received a silver medal award by the Reader's Favorite in the category Sports Fiction for the book. It was also a runner-up at the Hollywood Book Festival in the category genre-based books. The second part of the series is entitled Cauliflower Heart: Wrestling With Life and was released on October 7, 2016. The third and final part was released on February 17, 2017, and is called Cauliflower Heart: She Who Laughs Last.

== Other media ==
Hart worked as a model for 20 years in Calgary.

Hart has appeared in several documentaries, including Hitman Hart: Wrestling with Shadows, Surviving the Dungeon: The Legacy of Stu Hart and Hart & Soul: The Hart Family Anthology. In 2015 Hart appeared alongside her brother Ross on Shaw TV to speak about their father Stu's hundredth birthday. Hart appears in the documentary Hart Still Beating, which is about her brother Smith and nephew Matt. Hart is the subject of the 2017 shoot documentary Queen of Harts: The Diana Hart Story.

== Personal life ==
Hart met Davey Boy Smith when he was training under her father in 1981. They married on October 7, 1984, a day before her 21st birthday. The couple had two children together, Harry (born August 2, 1985) and Georgia (born September 26, 1987). They remained married until 2000, when the couple filed for divorce, and her son Harry followed his father and mother into professional wrestling. At the time of their split in 2000 they were not yet formally divorced, even though they both had begun new relationships with other people.

Hart has in her autobiography expressed interest in family research.

In 2015, Hart sold the rights to the British Bulldog wrestling trademark to her son Harry.

== Championships and accomplishments ==
- Canadian Wrestling Hall of Fame
  - Class of 2001
- Prairie Wrestling Alliance
  - Prairie Wrestling Alliance Hall of Fame (Class of 2010)
