= Donald Scott Stewart =

Donald Scott Stewart is an American mechanical engineer, focusing in fluid mechanics and thermal sciences, currently the Shao Lee Soo Professor Emeritus at University of Illinois.

== Early life and education ==
Stewart received a bachelor's degree in engineering science from State University of New York at Buffalo in 1976 and a doctorate in theoretical and applied science at Cornell University in 1981.
