= Donald Stewart (North Dakota politician) =

Scottish-born American politician (born 1832)

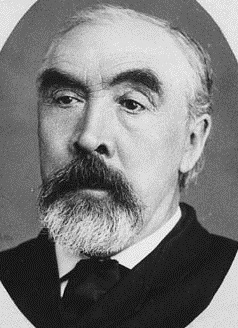
- Stewart in 1887

Member of the North Dakota House of Representatives from the Walsh County, North Dakota district

Personal details
- Born: c. 1832 Scotland
- Died: Saskatchewan
- Party: Democrat

Donald Stewart, born around 1832 in Scotland was a politician who served in the North Dakota House of Representatives.

== Career ==
He was at one point an assisting county surveyor and later became a twice elected as a territorial legislator in Bismarck. In the 1889 election he received 1615 votes. After serving four years he found himself tired of all the local political disputes and he retired from politics and moved with his family to Saskatoon, Canada.

== Personal life ==
Stewart originally emigrated from Scotland to Ontario, Canada and then to North Dakota. Later on he moved to Saskatchewan, Canada, where he stayed and owned a farm.

He was married to an English woman named Elizabeth Curtis. They had three children, one of them named Elizabeth, who went on to marry Edward Hart, thus making Stewart the maternal grandfather of Stewart "Stu" Hart, professional wrestling great and patriarch of the Hart wrestling family. Edward and Elizabeth would work for Stewart on his farm in Saskatoon for a few years before moving to Alberta.

== See also ==
- Hart wrestling family
