= Pamela Fischer (lawyer) =

Canadian lawyer

Pamela E. Fischer is a Canadian lawyer with the firm of McNally Cuming Raymaker in Calgary, Alberta, Canada. She helped win a $18 million settlement from World Wrestling Entertainment (then known as the World Wrestling Federation) after Canadian wrestler Owen Hart fell to his death at a wrestling match. No criminal charges were filed in connection with Hart's death.
