= Ross Hart =

Canadian professional wrestler (born 1960)

Personal information
- Born: Ross Lindsay Hart; January 3, 1960 (age 66) Calgary, Alberta, Canada
- Family: Hart; Jack Pfefer (godfather)

Professional wrestling career
- Ring name(s): Ross Hart; Ross Lindsey; Ross Lindsay; Rory Hunter
- Trained by: Stu Hart
- Debut: 1985
- Retired: 2005

Ross Lindsay Hart (born January 3, 1960) is a Canadian-American retired professional wrestler, promoter, trainer, booker, TV producer, coach and actor. Hart is a member of the Hart wrestling family and the second youngest son of Stu and Helen Hart. He is best known for his work in Stampede Wrestling and several appearances in WWE, often with his siblings Bruce, Keith, Bret, Diana and Owen Hart.

== Early life ==
Ross Hart was born in Calgary, Canada on January 3, 1960 (his older brother Dean Hart's sixth birthday). Hart is of Irish descent through his maternal grandfather and Greek descent through his maternal grandmother. His father was mainly of Scots-Irish descent but also had Scottish and English ancestry. Hart is a dual citizen of Canada and the United States due to his mother Helen Hart being from New York. Hart grew up in a household with 11 siblings, Smith, Bruce, Keith, Wayne, Dean, Ellie, Georgia, Bret, Alison, Diana and Owen.

Hart's middle name was given to him in honor of his father's longtime friend Luther Lindsay and he was the godson of wrestler and promoter Jack Pfefer. Hart has stated that his earliest memory is hearing his father Stu training wrestlers in their family basement, known as The Dungeon. Hart's first experience working for his father's promotion Stampede Wrestling was selling programs for the shows when he was six years old. Hart is a childhood friend of fellow wrestler Milad Elzein who is the same age, he would sometimes help Hart sell the programmes before the Stampede shows when they were young.

== Professional wrestling career ==
=== In the ring ===
==== Stampede Wrestling ====
In the 80s Hart wrestled for the original Stampede Wrestling having matches with wrestlers such as Drago Zhivago, Cuban Assassin, Gerry Morrow, Biff Wellington, Jude Rosenbloom, Chris Benoit, Goldie Rogers, Steve Blackman, Steve DiSalvo, Vokhan Singh, Great Gama, Mike Hammer, Beef Wellington, Mr. Hito, Vladimir Krupoff, Adolph Barbee, George Skaaland and brother in-law BJ Annis. Hart worked in tag team matches with Keiichi Yamada, Ken Johnson, George Skaaland and Johnny Smith as well as with his brothers Bruce against the Cuban Commandos. He participated in three-man tag team matches with his younger brother Owen and brother in-law Ben Bassarab against Drago Thomas, Gama Singh and Vladimir Krupoff as well. During this period he also took part in battle royales with many of the aforementioned wrestlers and competed for the Stampede British Commonwealth Mid-Heavyweight Championship.

==== Sporadic work and appearances for WWF ====
In the '80s Hart worked in the UK and wrestled on the program World of Sport in singles matches against Marty Jones and in tag team matches with his brother Owen against Fit Finlay and Rocky Moran, they performed as faces. Ross and Owen toured most of Europe together in 1983. Hart appeared at a pair of WWF television tapings in August 1990, wrestling as enhancement talent on the television program WWF Wrestling Challenge under the ring name Ross Lindsey. At the tapings he faced Ted DiBiase in a singles match and also teamed with Mike Pocari against The Orient Express, with Barry Hardy against Power And Glory, with Mike Morgan and Ron Cumberledge against Demolition. In 1994 hart worked for All Star Wrestling in England for a short period. He wrestled in victorious singles matches with Red Brocco, Johnny Angel, Duke Lynch, Count Von Zuppi, Drew McDonald. Duke Lynch being the only one he wrestled more than once. At the 1994 SummerSlam Hart can be seen attempting to climb the cage in which his brothers Bret and Owen Hart had their match together with other members of the Hart family.

==== Return to Stampede Wrestling and Wrestlemania appearance ====
Hart continued to wrestle sporadically for the 1999–2007 incarnation of Stampede Wrestling, having matches with wrestlers such as Rod Rage, Juggernaut, Cuban Assassin, Ryan Evans and Apocalypse before retiring in 2005. Hart appeared again for WWF (now renamed WWE) in an in ring capacity at WrestleMania XXVI, where he was a lumberjack for his brother Bret's first WWE match in 13 years, a No Holds Barred Lumberjack match against the WWE chairman Vince McMahon. The storyline was that McMahon had paid off Ross and the rest of the Hart family to betray Bret, but all of them turned on him and helped Bret win the match.

=== Promoting, booking and training ===
Hart worked as a Television Producer on the original Stampede Wrestling. Hart together with his brother Bruce relaunched their father's Stampede Wrestling promotion in 1999. Ross usually handled promotion in the smaller Alberta towns such as Hanna, Didsbury and Cochrane while Bruce took care of Ogden Legion. At this time the Hart brothers also handled at the Hart Brothers Wrestling Camp where they would train students, often with help from their father Stu and occasionally other relatives. In 2005 Hart worked as senior advisor and commissioner for Celtic Pro Wrestling in Ireland.

=== Other work in wrestling ===
Ross and his brother Bruce started the Stampede Wrestling Hall of Fame together. Together they also owned the copyright to many of the Stampede Wrestling tapes, some of which they gave to their brother Bret and some who they sold to WWE. Ross helped design his niece Natalya's ring costume, he criticized how revealing the original version was and opted to change it. In 2014 Ross inducted long time wrestling photographer Bob Leonard into the High Impact Wrestling Hall of Fame. Hart appeared on WWE television on stage together with all his living siblings when his father Stu Hart was posthumously inducted into the WWE Hall of Fame. Ross and his brother Smith were present for the induction of their father into the Professional Wrestling Hall of Fame in 2014. In 2017 Hart served together with his older brother Bret as part of the Professional Wrestling Hall of Fame and Museum's Distinguished Selection Committee, the committee decides which wrestlers will be inducted for that following year. During that year Hart inducted fellow Canadian Yvon Robert to the Hall of Fame.

== Other media ==
In 2006 Hart portrayed Humphrey Bogart in a theatrical rendition of Play It Again, Sam at the Workshop Theatre in Calgary.

Hart has appeared in several documentaries, including Hitman Hart: Wrestling with Shadows and Bret Hart: Survival of the Hitman which are both about his brother Bret, as well as the Hart family documentary Hart & Soul: The Hart Family Anthology and Surviving the Dungeon: The Legacy of Stu Hart which is about his father, and also 2016's Hart Still Beating, which is about his brother Smith and nephew Matt. Outside of documentaries about Harts's family he has also appeared in Dynamite Kid: A Matter of Pride.

In 2008 Hart appeared on the E! Chris Benoit special after Benoit's death. In 2015 Hart appeared alongside his sister Diana on Shaw TV to speak about their father Stu's one hundredth birthday.

== Personal life ==
Ross's niece Lindsay Hart who is a make up artist and wrestling personality is named after his middle name. On July 4, 1989 Hart was involved in an automobile accident near Jasper, Alberta together with Davey Boy Smith, Chris Benoit, Karl Moffat and Tatsumi Kitahara. Hart who was in the driver's seat and wearing a seatbelt received minor injuries, Smith who was sitting next to him and not wearing a seatbelt had his head smashed through the windshield resulting in a wound which required one hundred stitches. Karl Moffat was injured the most, one of his ankles was crushed by the spare tire. After the incident Moffat attempted to sue Hart, claiming he had been crippled by the event, but he did not succeed in receiving any compensation since a moving company Moffat had worked for supplied evidence of him moving around reasonably well after the accident.

Hart appeared at the Cauliflower Alley Club reunion in Las Vegas in February 2001. Since the passing of Hart family patriarch and matriarch Stu and Helen Hart, the traditional Sunday dinner is held at Ross' home. Hart has long been candid about the scripted nature of professional wrestling and approved of the Calgarian civic committee's decision to exclude it from its combative sports bylaw in 2006. In 2008 Ross Hart encouraged the city of Calgary to renovate but preserve his childhood home in its original form, this was eventually done between 2010 and 2012. Ross is the Hart family's historian and has an encyclopedic knowledge of the wrestling business according to his brother Bret and journalists Dave Meltzer.

== Championships and accomplishments ==
- Canadian Wrestling Hall of Fame
  - Class of 2001
- Prairie Wrestling Alliance
  - Prairie Wrestling Alliance Hall of Fame (Class of 2010)
