= Prairie Wrestling Alliance =

Canadian professional wrestling promotion

- Acronym: PWA
- Founded: 2001
- Defunct: 2022
- Style: American Wrestling
- Headquarters: Edmonton, Alberta, Canada
- Founder(s): Kurt Sorochan; Tex Gaines; Hercules Ayala
- Owner: Kurt Sorochan Nizar Watfa
- Website: www.pwawrestling.ca

The Prairie Wrestling Alliance (PWA, formerly Prairie Wrestling Association) was an independent wrestling promotion based in Edmonton, Alberta, Canada, and founded 2001. The PWA was co-owned, operated, and promoted by Kurt Sorochan. Lance Storm is a former booker with the promotion.

== History ==
The PWA was established in March 2001 by Kurt Sorochan, Tex Gaines, and Hercules Ayala. Their first shows were outside of Edmonton due to the difficulty of getting a promoter's license. Their first show in Edmonton drew over 700 people.

In 2003, they put on monthly events, which got mostly good reviews. The following year in 2004, however, they put on fewer shows due to scheduling conflicts. The company relaunched its shows in October 2004 with Night of Champions.

The PWA currently runs shows monthly in Edmonton, AB at the Northgate Lions Senior Recreation Center & Calgary, AB at the Century Casino. On January 20, 2014, the PWA announced that they would start running shows in Red Deer, AB on May 22, 2014. On May 31, 2014, the PWA ran its first show in Lloydminster Sask/Ab.

The PWA closed down in 2022.

== Alumni ==
- Michael Allen Richard Clark
- Shaun Moore
- "The Thickness" Reid Matthews
- Brandon Van Danielson
- "God's Gift to Wrestling" Michael Richard Blais
- Jack Pride
- "The Omen" Gabriel Lestat
- Mephisto
- Sheik Akbar Shabaz
- Chris Steele
- Kenneth Anthony
- Jeff Tyler
- Bobby Sharp
- Kenny Stryker
- Aiden Adams
- Colton Kelly
- "Kid Chocolate" Mo Jabari
- Nightmare
- The Titan
- "Spaceman" Beri Grayson
- Maxton Flexwell
- El Asesino

=== Women ===
- Kat Von Heez
- Zoë Sager
- Gigi Ray
- Taryn from Accounting

=== Managers ===
- Dr. Kyoto - Millennial Rebels
- Thaddeus Archer III - M.A.R.C & Andy Anderson

=== Factions ===
- The Western Lions: Michael Richard Blais/Brandon Van Danielson
- The Millennial Rebels: Kenneth Anthony/Colton Kelly/Dr. Kyoto
- The Above Average Joes: Kenny Stryker/Aiden Adams/Zoë Sager

== Staff ==
=== Referees ===
- Michael "The Fitz" Fitzpatrick
- Robert Young
- Gregory Thomas

=== Announcers ===
- What About Ivan
- Big Bad Boris

=== Commissioners ===
- Edmonton: Thaddeus Archer III
- Calgary: Duke Durrango

== Alumni ==
=== Male wrestlers ===
- Abdullah the Butcher
- Booker T
- Bully Ray
- Bushwacker Luke
- Colt Cabana
- Christian Cage
- Johnny Devine
- Devon
- Mick Foley
- Teddy Hart
- Homicide
- Frankie Kazarian
- Jay Lethal
- Jim "The Anvil" Neidhart
- Samoa Joe
- Tiger Singh(Jinder Mahal)
- Harry Smith
- Al Snow
- A.J. Styles
- TJ Wilson
- Apoc
- Mattias Wild
- Lance Storm
- Ravenous Randy
- Rohan Raja
- Amir Jordan
- Brett Morgan

=== Female wrestlers ===
- Nattie Neidhart
- Velvet Sky
- Angelina Love
- Maria Kanellis
- Mickie James
- KC Cassidy
- Krysta Lynn Scott
- Rachael Ellering
- Gisele Shaw

== PWA Hall of Fame ==
The PWA Hall of Fame is a professional wrestling hall of fame maintained by the Prairie Wrestling Alliance. It was established in 2008 to honor select wrestling personalities, mostly alumni of the Edmonton-based promotion. The induction ceremony for the Class of 2008, the inaugural inductees into the Hall of Fame, took place at the PWA's "Night of Champions VI" held at the NAIT Gymnasium on June 20, 2008. Duke Durango, a longtime "journeyman" wrestler and former PWA Champion, led the class, which included Stampede Wrestling mainstays Hercules Ayala, The Cuban Assassin, The Great Gama and Gerry Morrow.

#	Year	Ring name (Real name)^{[a]}	Inducted by	Inducted for	Notes^{[b]}
1	2008	Duke Durango (Jordan Clarke)	2008	Wrestling	Won the PWA Heavyweight Championship (1 time)
2	2008	Hercules Ayala (Ruben Cruz)		Wrestling	Co-founder of the Prairie Wrestling Alliance; longtime mainstay of Stampede Wrestling
3	2008	The Great Gama (Gadowar Singh Sahota)		Wrestling	
4	2008	Gerry Morrow (Gerard Ethifier)		Wrestling	
5	2008	The Cuban Assassin (Ángel Acevedo)		Wrestling	
6	2009	Red Thunder		Wrestling	Won the PWA Canadian Tag Team Championship (1 time)
7	2009	Johnny Devine (John Parsonage)		Wrestling	Won the PWA Canadian Tag Team Championship (1 time)
8	2009	Michael Fitzpatrick		Refereeing	
9	2010	Phoenix Taylor		Wrestling	Won the PWA Championship (1 time), PWA Commonwealth Championship (1 time) and PWA Tag Team Championship (1 time)
10	2010	Chris Steele		Wrestling	Won the PWA Championship (3 times) and PWA Tag Team Championship (2 times)
11	2010	Hart family		Wrestling	
12	2011	Marky Mark		Wrestling	Won the PWA Mayhem Championship (1 time), PWA Cruiserweight Championship (1 time) and PWA Canadian Tag Team Championship (2 times)
13	2011	Tex Gaines		Wrestling and Promoting	Co-founder of the Prairie Wrestling Alliance
14	2011	Kurt Sorochan		Promoting	Co-founder of the Prairie Wrestling Alliance
N/A	N/A	Samoa Joe (Nuufolau Joel Seanoa)		Wrestling	
N/A	N/A	Jeanette Sorochan			
N/A	N/A	Janie Roznicki			
15	2013	Sgt. Hazard (Don Ferguson)	Kurt Sorochan	Wrestling	Co-founder of the Prairie Wrestling Alliance
16	2013	Big Bad Boris	Kurt Sorochan	Promoting and Television Production	Longtime head of production for the Prairie Wrestling Alliance
17	2013	Dusty Adonis	Kurt Sorochan	Wrestling	Won the PWA Cruiserweight Championship (3 times)

- ^{a} – Entries without a birth name indicates that the inductee did not perform under a ring name.
- ^{b} – This section mainly lists the major accomplishments of each inductee in the promotion.

=== Defunct championships ===
Championship	Final Champion(s)	Previous	Event	Date Won	Location
PWA Championship	Chris Steele	Michael Allen Richard Clark	PWA Battle at the Dome 2	March 5, 2022	Calgary, AB
PWA Commonwealth Title	Shawn Spears	Shaun Moore	PWA Night of Champions	June 22, 2019	Edmonton, AB
PWA Canadian Tag Team Titles	The Above Average Joes (Kenny Stryker & Aiden Adams)	The League (Davey O'Doyle & Brayden Parsons)	PWA Night of Champions	June 22, 2019	Edmonton, AB
PWA Mayhem Title	"The Thickness" Reid Matthews	Kenneth Anthony	PWA Fruition	February 23, 2019	Edmonton, AB
PWA Women's Title	Zoe Sager	GiGi Rey	PWA Battle at the Dome 2	March 5, 2022	Calgary, AB
