= Canoe.com =

Canadian English-language portal site and website network

- French version logo
- Website type: Web portal
- Available in: English, French
- Owners: Postmedia Network and Quebecor Media
- Website: canoe.com
- Launched: February 4, 1996; 30 years ago

Canoe.com is an English-language Canadian portal site and website network, and is a subsidiary of Postmedia Network. The phrase Canadian Online Explorer appears in the header; the name is also evidently a play on words on canoe (or canoë in French).

Canoe's head office is in Toronto at 333 King Street East.

At launch, Canoe was a joint venture between Sun Media (Toronto Sun Publishing Corp.) and Rogers Communications (Rogers Multi-Media Inc.); however, Rogers sold its shares of Canoe to BCE Inc. within its first year.

At the height of its popularity, Canoe had both English and French language version and owned a significant number of websites, including JAM! and the Sun Media newspaper sites. According to May 2008 data from comScore Media Metrix, Canoe's portals and services receive over 7.7 million unique visitors per month in Canada, including over 3.2 million in Quebec.

== Services ==
Canoe offers the Canoe portal, as well as the TVA and LCN websites (tva.canoe.com and lcn.canoe.com). Canoe offers online services related to employment (jobboom.com).

== Defunct content ==
Canoe has offered online services that have since gone defunct, abandoned or usurped. These include a site for continuing education (formation.jobboom.com), housing (micasa.ca), automobiles (autonet.ca), expert services for car dealers (ASL Internet), dating (reseaucontact.com), social networking (espacecanoe.ca), classifieds (vitevitevite.ca) and online advertising (canoeklix.ca). Their portals La Toile du Québec (toile.com) and Argent (argent.canoe.ca or .com) are also defunct.

The portal originally operated under the canoe.ca domain alongside canoe.com. Following the 2015 sale of Sun Media's English-language operations to Postmedia Network, Postmedia consolidated English-language content and sub-portals (such as Slam! Sports and Jam!) under canoe.com, while Quebecor Media's MediaQMI continued to operate the French-language canoe.ca portal. After Quebecor discontinued the French portal and migrated its content to its other properties, the canoe.ca domain registration lapsed and was subsequently acquired by an unrelated online gambling site. Unlike canoe.com, the canoe.ca domain has since been excluded from the Wayback Machine. Because Canoe functioned primarily as an aggregator for Sun Media newspapers and wire services, much of the syndicated material formerly hosted on canoe.ca was simultaneously published across other Postmedia and Quebecor newspaper properties.
