= WWE Hall of Fame (2019) =

WWE Hall of Fame induction ceremony

- Promotion: WWE
- Date: April 6, 2019
- City: Brooklyn, New York
- Venue: Barclays Center

WWE Hall of Fame chronology
| ← Previous; 2018 | Next → 2021 |

The 2019 WWE Hall of Fame was a professional wrestling event produced by WWE that featured the introduction of the twentieth class into the WWE Hall of Fame. It took place on April 6, 2019, from the Barclays Center in Brooklyn, New York, as part of WrestleMania 35 weekend. The event aired live on the WWE Network.

== Background ==
On February 18, 2019, WWE announced their first inductees to the 2019 Hall of Fame class, D-Generation X. Although other members have been part of the group, only Triple H, Shawn Michaels, Chyna, Road Dogg, Billy Gunn and X-Pac will be included as part of the induction. D-Generation X originally had been planned to be inducted into the 2013 Hall of Fame class, but plans were scrapped after Bruno Sammartino agreed to be inducted. With D-Generation X's induction, Michaels joined Ric Flair as a two-time inductee, having been inducted individually in 2011. Following Chyna's death in 2016, many industry stalwarts, such as Stone Cold Steve Austin and Mick Foley, spoke out in favor of Chyna being included in the Hall of Fame, but she had been repeatedly excluded until 2019 due to her venture into pornography following the end of her professional wrestling career.

On February 26, 2019, The Honky Tonk Man was announced as the first individual inductee for the 2019 Hall of Fame ceremony. On April 5, 2019, it was announced that former Money Inc. manager Jimmy Hart would induct The Honky Tonk Man.

On March 3, 2019, Torrie Wilson was announced as the first female individual inductee for the 2019 Hall of Fame ceremony. She was inducted by fellow former women's wrestler Stacy Keibler.

On March 11, 2019, Harlem Heat (Booker T and Stevie Ray) were announced. With Harlem Heat's induction, Booker T will join Michaels and Flair as a two-time inductee, having been inducted individually in 2013. Prior to Booker T asking Stevie Ray to induct him, the two had not talked in five years.

On March 18, 2019, it was announced that WWE's Senior Director of Talent Relations Sue Aitchison would be the recipient of the 2019 Warrior Award. Aitchison is credited with WWE's relationship with the Make-A-Wish Foundation and WrestleMania Reading Challenge program.

On March 25, 2019, it was announced that the original Hart Foundation (Bret Hart and Jim Neidhart) would be inducted into the Hall of Fame. With the Hart Foundation's induction, Hart joined Booker T, Michaels and Flair as a two-time inductee, having been individually inducted in 2006.

Brutus "The Barber" Beefcake was announced as the final individual inductee for the 2019 Hall of Fame ceremony. On April 4, 2019, it was announced that he would be inducted by Mega-Maniacs teammate Hulk Hogan (Hogan's third time as inductor, having previously inducted "Mean" Gene Okerlund in 2006 and "Macho Man" Randy Savage in 2015).

== Inductees ==
=== Individual ===
| Image | Ring name (Birth Name) | Inducted by | WWE recognized accolades |
|---|---|---|---|
| | The Honky Tonk Man (Wayne Farris) | Jimmy Hart | One-time and longest reigning WWF Intercontinental Heavyweight Champion, a record 454 days (until 2023, when it was broken by Gunther) |
| 10.1.10TorrieWilsonByLuigiNovi | Torrie Wilson | Stacy Keibler | A "key figure in WCW's invasion of WWE" and "a pivotal member of the WWE women's division" who "helped blaze a trail for women in sports-entertainment". Two-time Playboy Cover Girl and Golden Thong Award winner |
| | Brutus "The Barber" Beefcake (Edward Leslie) | Hulk Hogan | One-time WWF Tag Team Champion |

=== Group ===
- Class headliners appear in **boldface**

| Image | Group | Inducted by | WWE recognized accolades |
|---|---|---|---|
| | **D-Generation X** | None | One of the leading factions of the Attitude Era, they are credited as having "[pushed] the envelope as to what was accepted on TV."; Different versions of the group existed into the 2010s, with The New Age Outlaws (Road Dogg and Billy Gunn) and Triple H and Shawn Michaels having held the WWF/World and WWE Tag Team Championship as part of the faction |
Shawn Michaels (Michael Hickenbottom) – Two-time inductee. Previously inducted in 2011 for his individual career. Triple H (Paul Levesque) – Later inducted in 2025 for his individual career. Chyna (Joan Laurer) -- Posthumous inductee: First woman to participate in the Royal Rumble match and King of the Ring tournament. Two-time WWF Intercontinental Champion (the only woman to win the title). One-time WWF Women's Champion. Recognized by WWE as a trailblazer and inspiration to many future female wrestlers. Billy Gunn (Monty Sopp) – 10-time WWF Tag Team Champion, one-time WWE Tag Team Champion, one-time WWF Intercontinental Champion, one-time WWF Hardcore Champion, 1999 King of the Ring winner. Road Dogg (Brian James) – Five-time WWF Tag Team Champion, one-time WWE Tag Team Champion, one-time WWF Intercontinental Champion, one-time WWF Hardcore Champion. X-Pac (Sean Waltman) – Two-time WWF European Champion, two-time WWF Light Heavyweight Champion, two-time WCW Cruiserweight Champion, four-time WWF Tag Team Champion, one-time WCW World Tag Team Champion.
| | Harlem Heat | None | 10-time WCW World Tag Team Champions |
Booker T (Robert Huffman) – Two-time inductee. Previously inducted in 2013 for his individual career. Stevie Ray (Lash Huffman) – One-time WCW Television Champion.
| | The Hart Foundation | None | Two-time WWF Tag Team Champions |
Bret Hart – Two-time inductee. Previously inducted in 2006 for his individual career. Jim Neidhart – Posthumous inductee: Represented by his daughter Natalya. One-time NWA Southern Heavyweight Champion.

=== Warrior Award ===
| Recipient (Birth name) | Presented By | Notes |
|---|---|---|
| Sue Aitchison | Dana Warrior; John Cena | Longtime WWE employee, spearheaded many of WWE's charitable programs, including its partnership with the Make-A-Wish Foundation |

=== Legacy ===
| Image | Ring name (Birth name) | WWE recognized accolades |
|---|---|---|
| | Bruiser Brody (Frank Goodish) | Held numerous regional NWA championships. Pioneer of the "hardcore" style. |
| | Wahoo McDaniel (Edward McDaniel) | Five-time NWA United States Heavyweight Champion (Mid-Atlantic version); Four time NWA World Tag Team Champion (Mid-Atlantic version) |
| | Luna Vachon (Gertrude Vachon) | Part of the Vachon wrestling family One-time USWA Women's Champion |
| | S. D. Jones (Conrad Efraim) | Three-time NWA Americas Tag Team Champion |
| | Professor Toru Tanaka (Charles Kalani Jr. ) | Inaugural WWWF International Tag Team Champion; Three-time WWWF World Tag Team Championship |
| | Primo Carnera | Held numerous regional NWA championships Former boxing World Heavyweight Champion |
| | Joseph Cohen | Media executive whose accomplishments included developing two of WWE's eventual broadcast partners, MSG Network and USA Network (part of Comcast now, a WWE television partner); First living inductee into the Legacy wing |
| | Hisashi Shinma | Longtime Japanese professional wrestling promoter Former on-screen authority of the WWWF and the WWF; Second living inductee into the Legacy wing until his death in 2025 |
| | Buddy Rose (Paul Perschmann) | Held numerous regional NWA championships |
| | Jim Barnett | Longtime wrestling promoter Former owner of the Indianapolis National Wrestling Alliance territory, Australia's World Championship Wrestling, and Georgia Championship Wrestling |

== Incidents ==
=== Assault on Bret Hart ===
During the induction of The Hart Foundation, as Bret Hart and Natalya delivered their speech, a man trespassed into the ring and tackled Hart. The live broadcast on the WWE Network suddenly blacked out when the attack happened and then the broadcast returned live with cameras panned to the crowd. In the immediate aftermath, several wrestlers including his nephew Davey Boy Smith Jr., Dash Wilder, Scott Dawson, Braun Strowman, Heath Slater, Drew McIntyre, Big Show, Shane McMahon, Big E, Kofi Kingston, Xavier Woods, and Drake Maverick, as well as MMA fighter Travis Browne subdued the man. Hart and Natalya resumed their speech. The man was arrested. The incident was removed from repeat airings of the ceremony on the WWE Network.

The man was taken into police custody and faced criminal charges, of which were not disclosed as the official was not authorized to discuss the case and spoke on the condition of anonymity. He was charged with two counts of third degree assault, one count of criminal trespass, and one violation of local law of disorderly conduct the next day. WWE issued a statement on the incident, reading: "An over-exuberant fan surpassed our security at ringside and made his way briefly into the ring. The individual has been turned over to the proper authorities." Dave Meltzer from Wrestling Observer Newsletter reported that Hart visited the hospital on Saturday night following the attack, suffering some discomfort with his hip replacement from the fall. Despite this, Hart made an appearance, during the entrance of Natalya and Beth Phoenix, the next day at WrestleMania 35.

=== Resignation of Robert Evans ===
Reportedly, WWE writers were asked not to mention WWE chairman and CEO Vince McMahon when helping to write speeches for Hall of Fame inductees. As a result, after Bret Hart thanked McMahon during The Hart Foundation's induction, Robert Evans, who was responsible for writing the line in the speech, got into a dispute with McMahon, and Evans ultimately quit the company.

=== Controversial Hulk Hogan induction of Brutus Beefcake ===
Despite previously being friends and storyline allies, Beefcake has acknowledged that despite what the induction by Terry Bollea (Hulk Hogan) suggested, he and Hogan were actually estranged in private at the time Hogan inducted him, with Hogan leaving the ceremony immediately after inducting him and not staying to hear Beefcake's remarks. In his speech, Beefcake referred to "Terry" as "my friend to the end." At the time of Hogan's death in July 2025, it was also acknowledged that the 2019 WWE Hall of Fame ceremony was the last time Beefcake ever spoke with Hogan.
