= Bret Hart =

Canadian professional wrestler (born 1957)

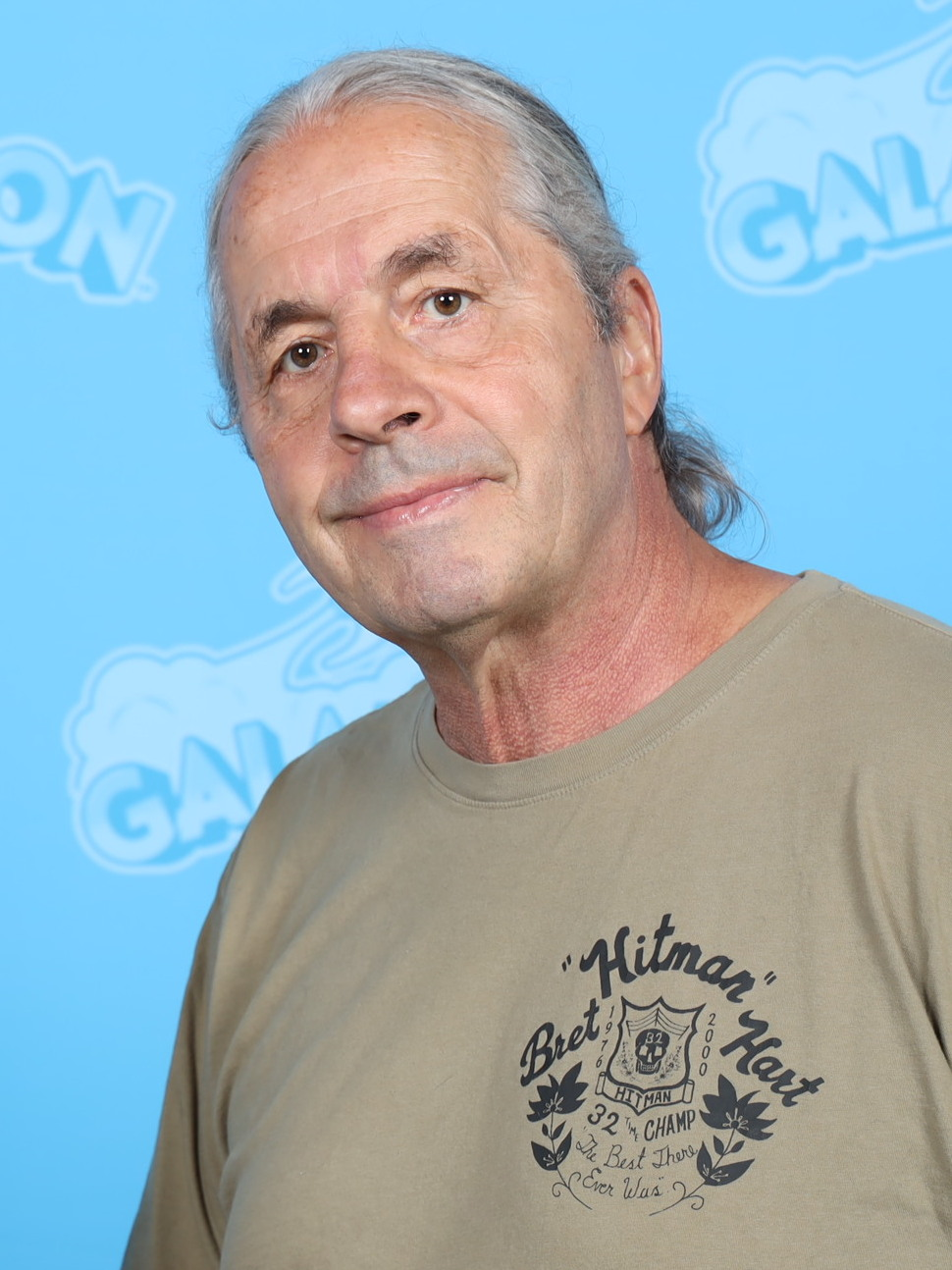
- Hart in 2023

Personal information
- Born: Bret Sergeant Hart; July 2, 1957 (age 69) Calgary, Alberta, Canada
- Spouses: Julie Smadu (m. 1982; div. 2002); Cinzia Rota (m. 2004; div. 2007); Stephanie Washington (m. 2010)
- Children: 4
- Father: Stu Hart
- Relative: Harry Smith (maternal grandfather)
- Family: Hart
- Website: brethart.com

Professional wrestling career
- Ring name(s): Bret Hart; Buddy Hart
- Billed height: 6 ft 0 in (183 cm)
- Billed weight: 235 lb (107 kg)
- Billed from: Calgary, Alberta, Canada
- Trained by: Stu Hart (Note: Stu mainly trained Bret in amateur wrestling.); Katsuji Adachi; Kazuo Sakurada
- Debut: March 29, 1978
- Retired: September 12, 2011 (Note: Hart announced his retirement on January 10, 2000, but would later participate in 11 matches from 2010 to 2011 which involved minimal physical risk.)

Signature
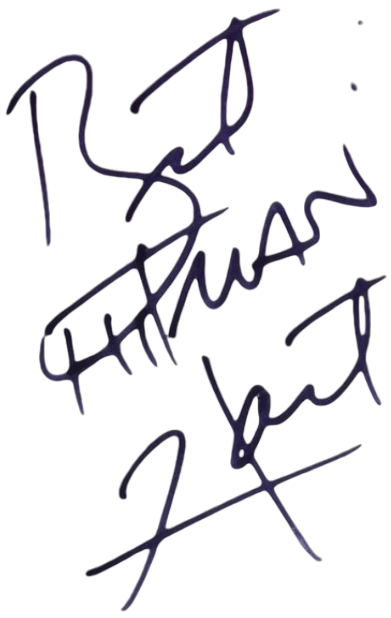

Bret Sergeant Hart (born July 2, 1957) is a Canadian and American retired professional wrestler. A member of the Hart wrestling family and a second-generation wrestler, he has an amateur wrestling background at Ernest Manning High School and Mount Royal College. A major international draw within professional wrestling, he is credited with changing the perception of mainstream North American professional wrestling in the early-mid 1990s by bringing technical wrestling to the fore. He is widely regarded as one of the greatest professional wrestlers of all time; Sky Sports noted that his legacy is that of "one of, if not the greatest, to have ever graced the squared circle". For the majority of his career, he used the nickname "the Hitman".

Hart joined his father Stu Hart's promotion Stampede Wrestling in 1976 as a referee and made his in-ring debut in 1978. He gained championship success during the 1980s and 1990s in the World Wrestling Federation (WWF, now WWE), where he helmed the Hart Foundation stable and was the face of company's New Generation Era. He left for World Championship Wrestling (WCW) following the controversial "Montreal Screwjob" in November 1997, where he remained until October 2000. Having been inactive from in-ring competition since January 2000, owing to a December 1999 concussion, he officially retired in October 2000, shortly after his departure from the company. He returned to sporadic in-ring competition from 2010 to 2011 with WWE, where he won his final championship, headlined the 2010 SummerSlam event, and served as the general manager of Raw. Throughout his career, he headlined the respective premier events of the WWF and WCW, WrestleMania (9, 10, and 12) and Starrcade (in 1999). He was inducted into the Wrestling Observer Newsletter Hall of Fame upon its inception in 1996, while still an active performer.

Hart held championship titles in five decades from the 1970s to the 2010s, 32 throughout his career and 17 between the WWF/WWE and WCW. Among other accolades, he is a seven-time world champion; a five-time WWF Champion and a two-time WCW World Heavyweight Champion. He went the most combined days as WWF Champion during the 1990s (654) and was the first WCW World Heavyweight Champion born outside the United States. He is the second WWF Triple Crown Champion and fifth (with Goldberg) WCW Triple Crown Champion. He is also the 1994 Royal Rumble match winner (with Lex Luger), and the only two-time King of the Ring, winning the 1991 tournament and the first King of the Ring pay-per-view in 1993. He co-headlined multiple pay-per-view events as part of an acclaimed rivalry with Stone Cold Steve Austin from 1996 to 1997. He is the first wrestler to be inducted three times into the WWE Hall of Fame: in 2006 individually, in 2019 as a member of the Hart Foundation, and in 2025 when his Submission match with Stone Cold Steve Austin at WrestleMania 13 was inducted as the inaugural entry into the Immortal Moments category.

Outside of wrestling, Hart has appeared in numerous films and television shows such as The Simpsons as well as featuring in several documentaries, both about himself specifically and others about his family or the wrestling industry in general. He also helped found and lent his name to the major junior ice hockey team the Calgary Hitmen and has written two biographies along with a weekly column for the Calgary Sun for over a decade. After his retirement, he spent much of his time on charitable efforts concerning stroke recovery and cancer awareness, due to his experiences with the two.

== Early life ==
The eighth child of wrestling patriarch Stu Hart and his wife Helen, Bret Hart was born in Calgary, Alberta, Canada into the Hart wrestling family. He is of Greek descent through his maternal grandmother and of Irish descent through his maternal grandfather. His father was of Scottish, Irish and English ancestry. Hart is a dual citizen of Canada and the United States since his mother Helen was born in New York. Hart has stated that he considers himself to be North American and that he is equally proud of his U.S. and Canadian nationality. His maternal grandfather was long-distance runner Harry Smith.

Hart grew up in a household with eleven siblings, seven brothers Smith, Bruce, Keith, Wayne, Dean, Ross and Owen, as well as four sisters, Ellie, Georgia, Alison and Diana. As a child he was the closest with his older brother Dean who was the nearest to him in age of all his older brothers, being three years his senior. Together they would often fight with Bret's two older sisters, Ellie, who was two years older, and Georgia, who was one year older. Hart's family were non-denominational Christians, but he and all of his siblings were baptized by a local Catholic priest.

Hart spent the vast majority of his childhood in the Hart family mansion which was owned by his father. During one period his father was housing a bear known as Terrible Ted chained under the building, the bear had had all of its teeth removed and Hart would sometimes as a very young child let the bear lick ice cream off his toes since he thought it was a good way to keep them clean.

His introduction to professional wrestling came at an early age. As a child, he witnessed his father training future wrestlers like Superstar Billy Graham in the Dungeon, his household basement which served as a training room. Before school, Hart's father, also a wrestling promoter, had him hand out fliers to local wrestling shows. In the 1998 documentary Hitman Hart: Wrestling with Shadows, Hart reflected on his father's discipline, describing how Stu uttered morbid words while inflicting excruciating submission holds that left broken blood vessels in Bret's eyes. Hart claimed his father had an otherwise pleasant demeanour.

Hart's first work in wrestling involved pulling out lucky numbers out of a metal box during intermission at the Stampede Wrestling shows when he was four years old. When he got slightly older, he would sell programs to the shows, something all Hart's seven brothers would do. He would often compete for customers with his little brother Ross since the fans would often want to buy from the youngest Hart child.

== Amateur wrestling ==
Like his father, Hart was an excellent amateur wrestler since an early age, having begun training as a nine-year-old. At Ernest Manning High School, Hart became a standout student in the amateur wrestling division. Hart has stated that he joined the wrestling team "for the sole reason that my dad expected me to... no-one asked me to". He won significant championships in tournaments throughout Alberta, including the 1974 city championships in Calgary. He scored a victory over competitor Bob Eklund – who would go on to become a Canadian Interuniversity Sport national champion, winning "Outstanding Wrestler of the Year 1980–1981" – en route to the championship. He described his display of the medal to Stu as a "powerful moment", and said his relationship with his father "took a different direction from that point on". Hart considered the medals to be one of his most prized possessions.

By 1977, Hart was a champion at Mount Royal College, where he was studying filmmaking; his coaches and other people around him felt that he had shown sufficient promise to compete at the following year's Commonwealth Games and encouraged him to begin training for the event. He began to find amateur wrestling unrewarding amid injuries and fluctuating weight. Stu still believed his son capable of making it to the Olympic or Commonwealth Games if he put forth the effort. Bret said he believed that even if he became an exceptionally successful amateur wrestler, it would not have led to a career that interested him, rather one as a wrestling coach or high school gym teacher.

Hart felt the only way to give up amateur wrestling without disappointing his father was to become a professional wrestler. His college grades became poorer as his interest in filmmaking waned; he dedicated himself to professional wrestling and began training with his father's Stampede Wrestling promotion. Hart has spoken of how helpful his amateur background was in his professional wrestling career, and of what a positive effect amateur wrestling has on junior high school and high school-aged boys in terms of building self-confidence.

== Professional wrestling career ==
=== Stampede Wrestling (1976–1984) ===
In 1976, Hart began working for his father's Stampede Wrestling promotion in Calgary. Hart first began helping the promotion by refereeing matches. At a 1978 event in Saskatoon, Saskatchewan, a wrestler was unable to perform his match, forcing Stu to ask his son to stand in as a replacement. Hart teamed with Hubert Gallant losing to Mr. Hito and Mr. Sakurada. Before long, he became a regular contender, eventually partnering with brother Keith to win the Stampede International Tag Team Championship four times.

Hart gained some of his most prominent experience with Japanese combatants and real-life trainers Mr. Hito and Mr. Sakurada. Hart also had high-impact matches against Tom Billington, who was better known by his in-ring name as the Dynamite Kid. In the midst of wrestling alongside his family, Hart made a point not to ride on the shoulders of his elders. Hart faithfully jobbed as requested of him, taking pride in the believability of his performances. As he said himself, "No one could take a shit-kicking like Bret Hart". Although he dreaded partaking in interviews and speaking in front of a crowd, Hart went on to win the promotion's top titles, including two British Commonwealth Mid-Heavyweight Championships, five International Tag Team Championships, and six North American Heavyweight Championships.

Hart remained one of Stampede's most successful performers until the promotion, along with several wrestlers, was acquired by the World Wrestling Federation (WWF) in August 1984.

=== New Japan Pro-Wrestling (1980, 1982, 1984) ===
Hart debuted in New Japan Pro-Wrestling (NJPW) on June 19, 1980, as part of its "Summer Fight Series", teaming with his brother Keith Hart to defeat George Takano and Kantaro Hoshino. Over the following weeks, Hart faced opponents including Tatsumi Fujinami, Strong Kobayashi, and Antonio Inoki. He also competed in a series of six-man tag team matches, teaming with Keith, Tiger Jeet Singh, Johnny Mantell, and Umanosuke Ueda. On July 23, Hart faced Kengo Kimura in Kitakyushu for the vacant NWA International Junior Heavyweight Championship, with Kimura winning with a German suplex. Hart wrestled his final match of the tour on July 25, teaming with Keith in a loss to Hoshino and Kimura. Hart was paid $7,050 (equivalent to $27,500 in 2025) for the tour.

Hart returned to Japan for a second tour with NJPW in January–February 1982 as part of its "New Year Golden Series". In his first match, he teamed with Dynamite Kid in a loss to Tatsumi Fujinami and Tiger Mask in Kitakyushu. His other opponents on the tour included Kengo Kimura, Antonio Inoki, Akira Maeda, Riki Choshu, and Ryuma Go. On February 5, Hart unsuccessfully challenged Tiger Mask for the WWF Junior Heavyweight Championship in the Nakajima Sports Center in Sapporo. In April 1982, Hart faced Tiger Mask in a pair of matches promoted by NJPW in Dubai in the United Arab Emirates. Hart made a third tour of Japan with NJPW in July–August 1982 as part of its "Summer Fight Series II". In his first match, he teamed with Dynamite Kid to defeat Kengo Kimura and Tiger Mask in Nakama, Fukuoka. He faced Tiger Mask in various matches throughout the tour, including unsuccessfully challenging him for the WWF Junior Heavyweight Championship in Nagoya, Aichi on July 30. In his final match of the tour, on August 5, he defeated Kengo Kimura in Tokyo's Kuramae Kokugikan.

Hart made a fourth tour of Japan with NJPW in January–February 1984 as part of its "New Year Golden Series". He competed in a round-robin tournament for the now-vacant WWF Junior Heavyweight Championship, defeating Kuniaki Kobayashi, Nobuhiko Takada, and Baby Face, wrestling Cobra and Kobayashi to draws, and losing to Black Tiger, Davey Boy Smith, and the eventual winner of the tournament, Dynamite Kid. He made his fifth and final tour with NJPW in November–December 1984 as part of its "Toukon Series", facing opponents including Cobra, Kengo Kimura, Seiji Sakaguchi, and Tatsumi Fujinami.

=== World Wrestling Federation (1984–1997) ===
==== The Hart Foundation (1984–1991) ====
Hart was asked to start out in the WWF as a singles wrestler with a cowboy gimmick but refused, stating that in Calgary, "if you called yourself a cowboy, you'd better be one". He made his televised WWF debut on August 29, 1984, in a tag team match where he teamed with the Dynamite Kid. On September 11, in Poughkeepsie, New York, Hart defeated Aldo Marino in his televised debut singles match, which aired on the September 29 episode of WWF Superstars of Wrestling.

In 1985, after acquiring the nickname of "Hit Man", Hart requested to join Jimmy Hart's heel stable, the Hart Foundation, which included brother-in-law Jim Neidhart. Bret began to increasingly team with Neidhart, in order to build the promotion's tag team division. The "Hart Foundation" name then became exclusive to Bret, Neidhart and manager Jimmy Hart, due to the similar family names of both team members and their manager. Bret's agile, technical style – which earned him the moniker "The Excellence of Execution" (coined by Gorilla Monsoon) – created a contrast with his partner Neidhart's strength and brawling skills. During this time, Hart began wearing his signature sunglasses, initially to conceal his nervousness during promos. Hart considers his microphone work to have been a weakness throughout his early career.

In 1986, Hart began his first singles program with Ricky Steamboat, and in a singles match originally planned for WrestleMania 2, he lost to Steamboat at the Boston Garden on March 8, 1986, which would be included on Hart's 2005 DVD as one of his all-time favourite matches. At WrestleMania 2, Hart instead participated in a 20-man battle royal which was eventually won by André the Giant. He lost to Steamboat again on the July 28, 1986, episode of Prime Time Wrestling. Hart headlined his first televised WWF card when he beat Ray Rougeau, of The Fabulous Rougeau Brothers, in the main event of the November 3, 1986, episode of Prime Time Wrestling.

The Hart Foundation won their first of two WWF Tag Team Championship on the February 7, 1987, episode of Superstars of Wrestling when they defeated The British Bulldogs. They then teamed with Danny Davis to face the British Bulldogs and Tito Santana at WrestleMania III. They won the match when Davis pinned Davey Boy Smith after hitting him with Jimmy Hart's megaphone.

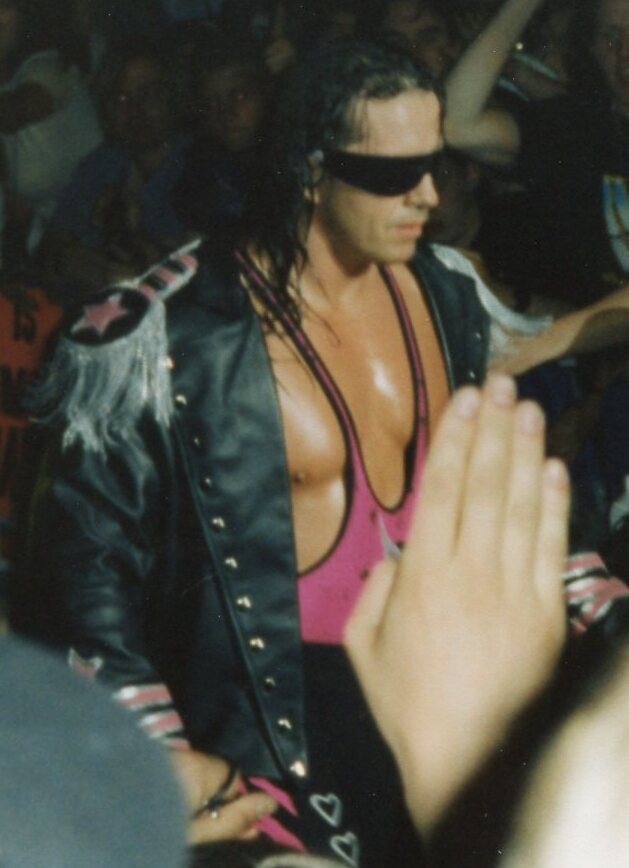
For his entrances, Hart often wore a leather jacket with shoulder tassels (epaulets), Mylar wrap-around (originally silver, later pink) sunglasses and bright pink attire

The Hart Foundation lost the WWF Tag Team Championship titles to Strike Force on the October 27 episode of Superstars of Wrestling. Hart subsequently competed in his most high-profile singles contest to date on the November 28, 1987, episode of Saturday Night's Main Event XIII, when he faced "Macho Man" Randy Savage in a losing effort. He began 1988 with a decisive victory over Paul Roma of The Young Stallions (who had scored an upset victory over the Hart Foundation the previous year) on the January 11 episode of Prime Time Wrestling, and, at the Royal Rumble in January 1988, was the first entrant in the inaugural Royal Rumble match. He lasted 25 minutes and 42 seconds before being eliminated by Don Muraco.

Entered into another battle royal at WrestleMania IV, Hart was again one of the final two combatants as he was enlisted by former frequent Stampede opponent Bad News Brown to eliminate Junkyard Dog before Brown turned on Hart, eliminating him to win the event. This turned Hart back into a fan favourite and triggered a feud between the two. Neidhart soon came to Hart's side in the feud, but manager Jimmy Hart discouraged the feud, leading to a fallout between the team and manager. This led to matches pitting Hart against Davis and his first singles championship opportunity, in which he challenged The Honky Tonk Man for the WWF Intercontinental Heavyweight Championship in the main event of the July 18 episode of Prime Time Wrestling, with the match ending in a double count-out. As relations between the Harts and their former mentor further deteriorated, Jimmy Hart assisted tag team champions Demolition in a successful defence of their belts against the Harts at SummerSlam in August 1988, before enlisting old enemies the Fabulous Rougeau Brothers, who had recently turned heel, to resume their feud with the Harts.

At the Royal Rumble in January 1989, the Hart Foundation teamed with Jim Duggan to defeat the Rougeaus and Dino Bravo. They also defeated Greg Valentine and The Honky Tonk Man, who were also managed by Jimmy Hart, at WrestleMania V. At an event in Milan on April 8, 1989, broadcast live on Tele+2, André the Giant requested to work a singles match with Hart, who lost the match, which was later released on his 2013 DVD set, The Dungeon Collection, but considered André's praise and encouragement after the match to be of key importance in his singles career. He wrestled his first pay-per-view singles match on October 10, losing to Dino Bravo in the first British WWF pay-per-view, which was held at the London Arena and broadcast on Sky Television (Hart was in fact booked to win the match, but incurred a broken sternum, causing an unplanned countout loss).

At SummerSlam in August 1989, the Hart Foundation lost a non-title match against then WWF Tag Team Champions The Brain Busters. In the first televised contest of a rivalry that would span Hart's WWF and WCW careers, he lost to Mr. Perfect on the November 6, 1989, episode of Prime Time Wrestling, when Perfect pulled Hart's tights during a roll-up. In their first ever singles meeting, Shawn Michaels and Hart wrestled to a double countout on the February 11, 1990, episode of the Wrestling Challenge.

After participating at the Royal Rumble in January 1990, the Hart Foundation defeated The Bolsheviks in 19 seconds at WrestleMania VI and began feuding with Demolition, who had just won the WWF Tag Team Championship from the Colossal Connection at WrestleMania VI. At the WWF/AJPW/NJPW Wrestling Summit - an event jointly promoted by the WWF, All Japan Pro Wrestling, and New Japan Pro-Wrestling in the Tokyo Dome on April 13, 1990 - Hart wrestled Tiger Mask to a time limit draw. At SummerSlam in 1990, the Hart Foundation began their second, and final, WWF Tag Team Championship reign by defeating Demolition members Crush and Smash in a two out of three falls match with some help from the Legion of Doom. On October 30, the Hart Foundation lost the title to The Rockers (Marty Jannetty and Shawn Michaels), but a few days later, President Jack Tunney reversed the decision and the win was never acknowledged on television. The Hart Foundation's reign lasted until WrestleMania VII, where they lost to The Nasty Boys, after which the team split.

==== Intercontinental Champion (1991–1992) ====
Hart won his first WWF Intercontinental Championship by defeating Mr. Perfect with the Sharpshooter at SummerSlam in 1991, and subsequently won the 1991 King of the Ring tournament on September 7, 1991, at the Providence Civic Center in Providence, Rhode Island. Hart's first pay-per-view title defense occurred at This Tuesday in Texas, where he beat the undefeated Skinner.

In January 1992, Hart was placed in a feud with Jacques Rougeau, who by now was wrestling as "The Mountie" and using the gimmick of a power-hungry, corrupt member of the Royal Canadian Mounted Police. This feud, the first for Hart and Rougeau as singles competitors, came about when the Mountie's manager, Jimmy Hart, threw water on Hart, and The Mountie proceeded to shock Hart with a cattle prod. On January 17, 1992, Hart dropped the Intercontinental Championship to The Mountie. Following the loss, Roddy Piper defeated Mountie with a sleeper hold two days later at the 1992 Royal Rumble, and Bret later pinned Piper for his second Intercontinental Championship at WrestleMania VIII later that year, making him the first wrestler in the WWF – and one of few wrestlers ever – to pin Piper's shoulders to the mat. At a Wrestling Challenge taping on July 21, 1992, Hart defeated Shawn Michaels, with the Intercontinental Championship belt suspended above the ring, in the WWF's first ever ladder match. Hart dropped the Intercontinental Championship to his brother-in-law, Davey Boy Smith, in Hart's first WWF pay-per-view main event at SummerSlam in August 1992, held before over 80,000 fans at Wembley Stadium. Pro Wrestling Illustrated readers voted it the "Match of the Year", and WWE named the match as the greatest in the history of SummerSlam. Upon induction into the WWE Hall of Fame class of 2006, Hart cited the contest as his favourite match of his career.

==== WWF Champion (1992–1996) ====
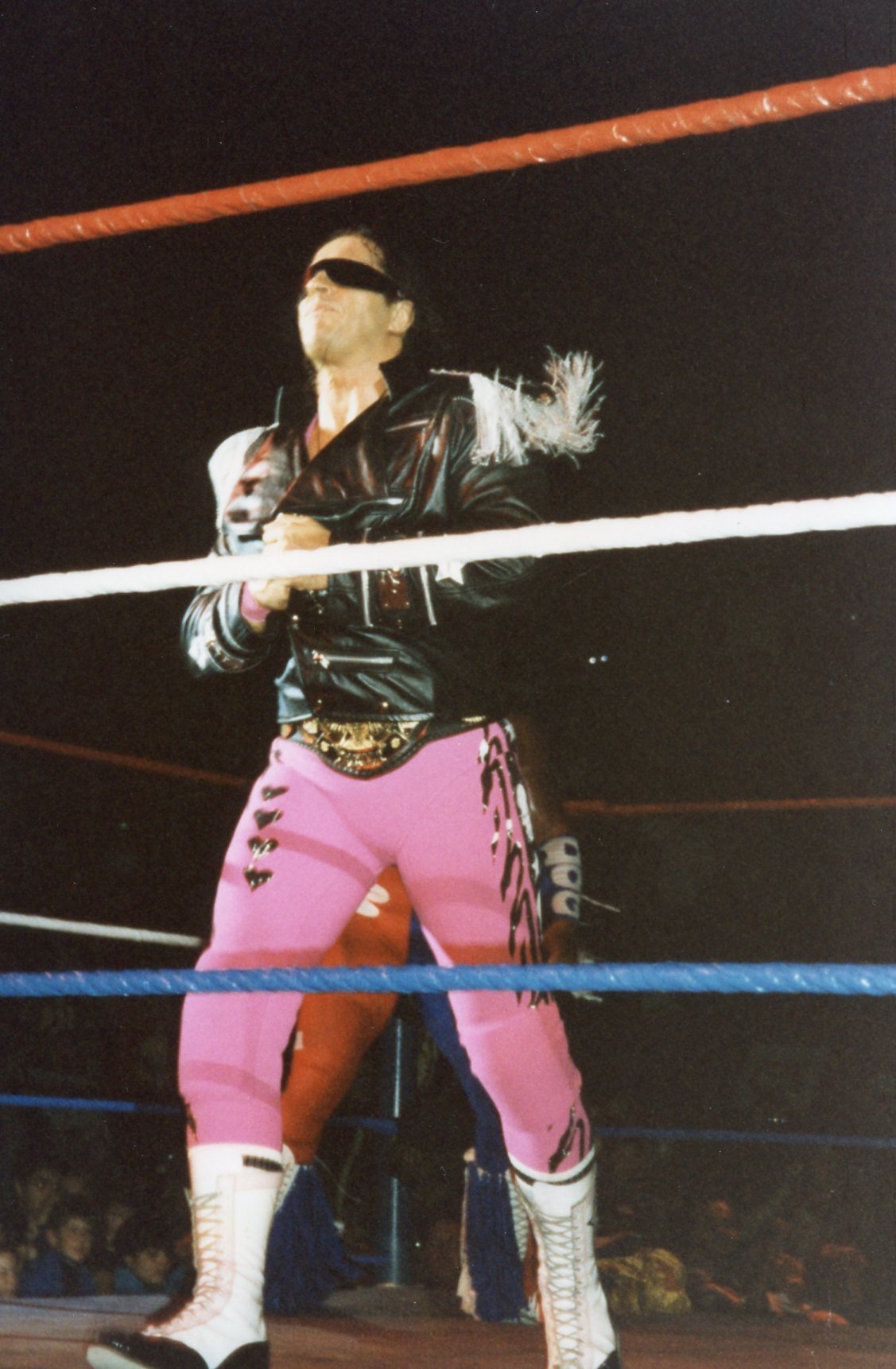
Hart with his WWF Championship belt underneath his jacket

Hart won the WWF Championship from Ric Flair at a Superstars taping at Saskatchewan Place in Saskatoon, Saskatchewan on October 12 of that year, in a match not originally broadcast on WWF television – the match was instead made available on a series of Coliseum/WWE Home Video releases. Hart dislocated one of the fingers on his left hand during the match and popped it back in himself so it would not affect the rest of the match. He made successful title defenses against Kamala, The Berzerker and Papa Shango. He would headline his first pay-per-view as champion with a successful title defense against Shawn Michaels at the 1992 Survivor Series, and defeated Razor Ramon at the 1993 Royal Rumble. He would also defend the title against contenders such as Papa Shango and former champion Ric Flair before losing the title to Yokozuna in his first WrestleMania main event at WrestleMania IX, after interference from Mr. Fuji. Fuji then challenged Hulk Hogan, who had come out to help Hart, to compete for the title; Hogan then won his fifth WWF Championship from Yokozuna. In June, Hart won the first pay-per-view King of the Ring tournament, defeating Razor Ramon, Mr. Perfect, and Bam Bam Bigelow, thus becoming the only two-time King of the Ring. According to Hart, he was scheduled to regain the WWF Championship from Hulk Hogan at SummerSlam, but Hogan chose to drop the title to Yokozuna instead at King of the Ring. Hart instead entered a feud with Jerry "The King" Lawler, who interrupted Hart's coronation, claimed he was the only king, attacked Hart and began a barrage against Hart and his family. The two met at SummerSlam in 1993, to determine the "Undisputed King of the World Wrestling Federation". Hart originally won the match by submission, via the Sharpshooter, but as he would not let go of the hold, the decision was reversed to a Lawler victory by disqualification. Hart and his younger brother, Owen Hart, would also feud with Lawler during 1993 in the United States Wrestling Association (USWA), with Lawler notably defeating Owen for Owen's USWA Unified World Heavyweight Championship. Hart's feud with Lawler was named "Feud of the Year" by Wrestling Observer Newsletter, and voted "Feud of the Year" by readers of Pro Wrestling Illustrated.

After months of dealing with Lawler, Hart received a WrestleMania IX rematch with WWF Champion Yokozuna on the November 20 episode of WWF Superstars. When Bret appeared to have the match won, with Yokozuna locked in the sharpshooter, Owen came to ringside to congratulate his brother. The referee began questioning Owen's motives, which allowed Fuji to assault Bret. Owen then involved himself in the match, resulting in a victory for Yokozuna via disqualification. On the non-televised but now-canon November 22 episode of Monday Night Raw, Hart again challenged Yokozuna for the WWF Championship, and again failed to regain the championship due to similar involvement from Owen. The brothers' disagreements set the wheels in motion for a family feud that would span the entirety of 1994. At Survivor Series, the Harts (Bret, Owen, Bruce, and Keith) took on Shawn Michaels (a substitution for Lawler, who was facing legal troubles) and his knights. The Harts won the match, with all of the brothers surviving except for Owen, the only Hart family member eliminated when he was rolled up by Michaels after inadvertently knocking Bret off the apron. Bitter about his elimination, Owen blamed Bret for this and in the weeks ahead, blamed Bret for holding him back. Owen demanded a one-on-one match with Bret, which Bret refused to accept. In the storyline, Bret, along with his parents, worked over the Christmas holidays to reunite the family and to settle their rivalry. Bret was voted "WWF Superstar of the Year" 1993 by fans, as well as the greatest wrestler of the year by Pro Wrestling Illustrated readers.

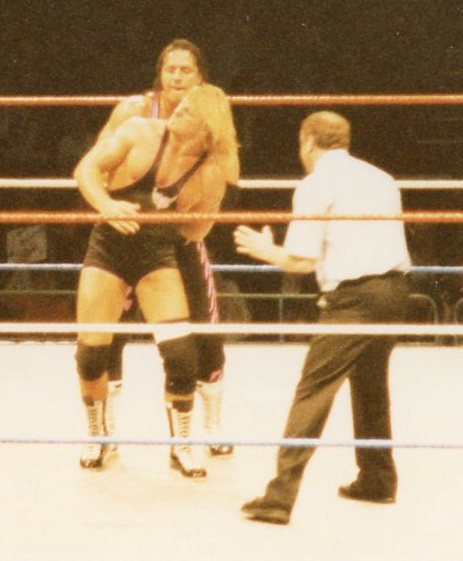
Bret's rivalry with his brother Owen won them Pro Wrestling Illustrated's Feud of the Year award and featured a highly rated steel cage match at SummerSlam

At the Royal Rumble in January, Bret and Owen took on The Quebecers (Jacques and Pierre) for the WWF Tag Team Championship. Referee Tim White stopped the match after he considered Bret unable to continue after he sustained a kayfabe knee injury during the match. After the match, Owen berated his brother for costing him a title opportunity and attacked the injured knee, setting the feud between the two. Later on, Hart managed to participate and win the 1994 Royal Rumble match amid controversy. Hart and Lex Luger were the final two participants and the two were eliminated over the top rope at the same time. Therefore, both men were named co-winners of the 1994 Royal Rumble match and received title shots at WrestleMania X. Luger won the chance to face Yokozuna first, with Hart having to wrestle his brother Owen, before receiving his title shot. Hart lost his match against Owen but went on to defeat Yokozuna for his second WWF Championship.

Hart continued to feud with his brother Owen while he also started feuding with Diesel. Hart's friend and former tag team partner Jim Neidhart returned to the WWF and reunited with Hart. At King of the Ring, Hart defended the WWF Championship against Diesel. When Hart was winning the match, Shawn Michaels interfered on Diesel's behalf; Diesel appeared close to victory after he delivered a Jackknife Powerbomb yet before he could pin Hart, Neidhart interfered, therefore Diesel won by disqualification, but Hart retained his title. Neidhart left when Diesel and Michaels attacked Hart following the match. Neidhart's motivation was made clear when he helped Owen win the tournament that night, so that he could receive a title shot against his brother. At SummerSlam, Hart successfully retained the WWF Championship against Owen in a steel cage match. This match received a five-star rating from Dave Meltzer of Wrestling Observer Newsletter, and the brothers' feud was voted "Feud of the Year" by readers of Pro Wrestling Illustrated.

Hart eventually lost his WWF Championship at Survivor Series in a submission match against Bob Backlund where the manager of either competitor (Davey Boy Smith for Hart, Owen for Backlund) would have to "throw in the towel" for the wrestler they were representing. When Hart was in Backlund's crossface chickenwing and Davey Boy was kayfabe knocked out, Owen persuaded his mother Helen to throw in the towel for Hart, giving Backlund the championship victory. Bret's feud with Backlund would continue into the following year. He was voted the greatest wrestler of 1994 by Pro Wrestling Illustrated readers, winning the vote for the second straight year.

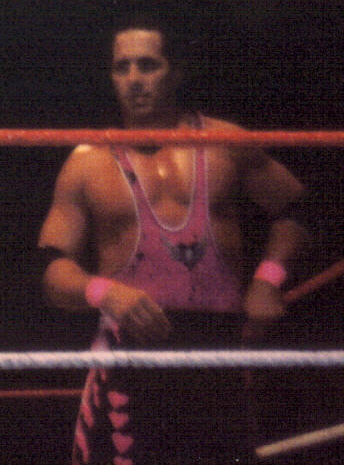
Hart in 1995

Three days after Hart's title loss, Diesel defeated Backlund in eight seconds with a jackknife powerbomb to become the new WWF Champion. By 1995, Hart was focusing on projects outside the business, such as acting, and shifted to the number two face in the company, behind Diesel. Hart challenged for Diesel's WWF Championship at the 1995 Royal Rumble, in a match that was continually marred by outside interference and ruled a draw. Both men embraced in a display of sportsmanship after the match. In a rematch from Survivor Series, Hart defeated Bob Backlund in an "I Quit" match at WrestleMania XI. Hart was critical with the match against Backlund, claiming it was "probably my worst pay-per-view match I ever had". Hart would be the focal point of the first event in the In Your House pay-per-view series, competing in two matches at In Your House 1. He defeated Hakushi in the first match of the in Your House series. Hart's acclaimed feud with Jerry Lawler was reignited at the event when Lawler defeated Hart due to Hakushi's (now Lawler's protégé) interference. Hart beat Lawler in a "Kiss My Foot" match at King of the Ring, and defeated Lawler's kayfabe dentist, Isaac Yankem, by disqualification at SummerSlam 1995. Their King of the Ring match ended with Hart shoving his foot into Lawler's mouth, then forcing Lawler to kiss his own foot. Although Hart was victorious in their in-ring feud, Lawler remained strongly opposed to Hart as a commentator, and would routinely encourage Hart's opponents during matches; it would not be until Over the Limit, sixteen years later, that both men would finally bury the hatchet. After disposing of Lawler, Hart engaged in a three-month feud with Jean-Pierre Lafitte, who would be stealing the mirrored sunglasses from fans at ringside and his trademark leather jacket. At In Your House 3, Hart defeated Lafitte, to end the feud. Hart shifted his focus back to the WWF Championship, defeating Diesel in a no disqualification match at Survivor Series to commence his third reign.

In a rematch from their SummerSlam 1992 encounter, Hart successfully defended his title against the now heel Davey Boy Smith at In Your House 5: Seasons Beatings. He lost to The Undertaker by disqualification at the 1996 Royal Rumble when Diesel interfered, ultimately retaining the WWF Championship, and defeated The Undertaker by disqualification in a rematch on the February 5 episode of Raw, again due to Diesel's interference. Hart retained his title once again against Diesel in a steel cage match at In Your House 6, and defeated Hunter Hearst Helmsley, who was undefeated on Raw, on the March 4 episode of the show. WWF Commissioner Rowdy Roddy Piper ruled that Hart would face Shawn Michaels, who had earned a WWF Championship match at WrestleMania XII by winning the Royal Rumble, in a 60-minute Iron Man match at the event. The wrestler with the most decisions during the 60 minutes would win the match and the WWF Championship.

At WrestleMania, with less than a minute left on the clock and the score still 0–0, Michaels jumped from the middle rope; his legs were caught by Hart, and Hart locked in his Sharpshooter. Michaels did not submit in the last 30 seconds, so the match ended in a tie. WWF President Gorilla Monsoon ruled that the match would continue in sudden death overtime. Michaels hit a superkick to win the championship. Pro Wrestling Illustrated readers voted it the "Match of the Year"; in 2004, WWE fans voted the match as the greatest in the history of WrestleMania. After WrestleMania, Hart went on a European tour over the next two weeks, coming out victorious against Stone Cold Steve Austin and Hunter Hearst Helmsley. The tour ended on April 22, and after this he took his hiatus from television. His final televised appearance was an interview taped while on the European tour in which he described his passion for wrestling was diminished and stated that although there were offers from competing companies, he might be finished with wrestling.

That fall, Hart would indeed receive competing offers of employment from both WWF and World Championship Wrestling (WCW). WCW presented a 3-year, $9M contract offer to Hart, while the World Wrestling Federation responded with an unprecedented 20-year contract. Finishing up his original WWF deal, Hart returned to action on a tour of South Africa on September 8, 1996, defeating Davey Boy Smith in Durban. On October 21, Hart elected to re-sign with the World Wrestling Federation. He was inducted into the Wrestling Observer Newsletter Hall of Fame Class of 1996.

==== Feud with Stone Cold Steve Austin (1996–1997) ====
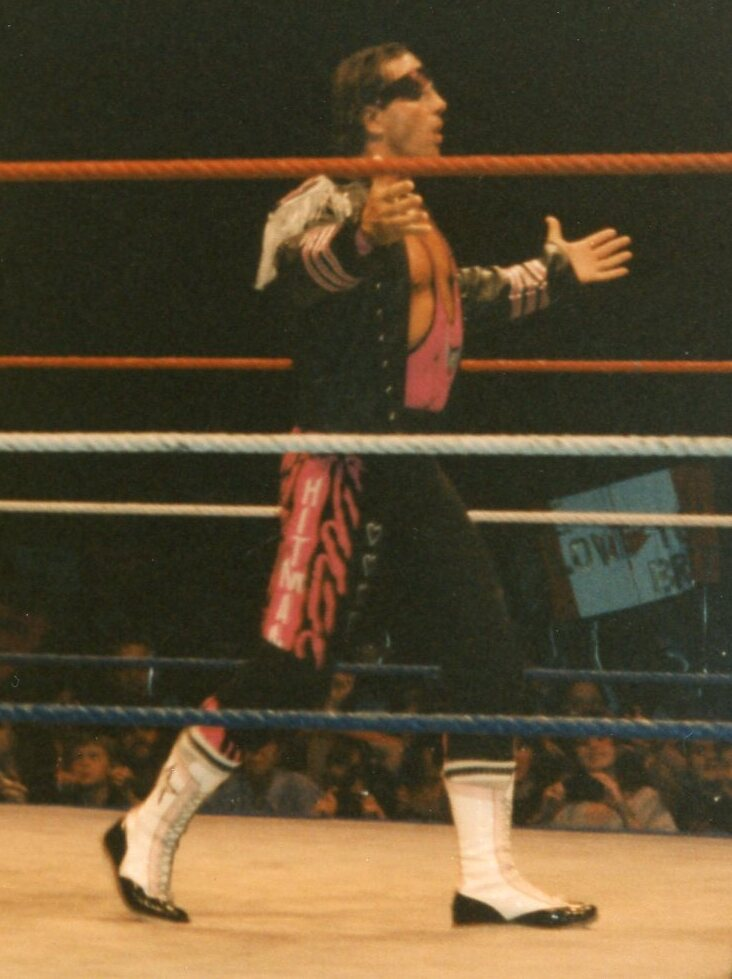
Hart posing for the crowd with his arms open

Over the summer, Stone Cold Steve Austin, who was fresh from winning the 1996 King of the Ring, continually taunted Hart and challenged him to come back and have a match. After an eight-month hiatus from television, Hart returned and defeated Austin at Survivor Series in a match for the number one contender spot to the WWF Championship. Hart challenged champion Sycho Sid at the following month's In Your House 12: It's Time; Shawn Michaels, who was serving as a guest commentator at ringside, accidentally cost Hart the victory when he attempted to become involved in the match after being assaulted by Sid. The building tension between Hart and Michaels climaxed after the match when Hart assaulted Michaels. Hart's feud with Austin escalated at the Royal Rumble, when Hart tossed Austin out of the ring, only for Austin (unbeknownst to the referees) to climb back into the ring and win the Royal Rumble match, while the referees were distracted by Mankind. Hart quit the WWF the next night on Raw in protest. In order to deal with this controversy, a Fatal Four-Way between Austin and the participants he eliminated after re-entering the ring (Vader, The Undertaker, and Hart) was set up for In Your House 13: Final Four, with the winner becoming the number one contender. After then-champion Shawn Michaels relinquished the belt, though, the match officially became for the WWF Championship. Hart defeated Austin, Vader, and The Undertaker in the Fatal Four-Way. Austin ensured Hart's fourth reign was short-lived, costing him a title match against Sid the next night on Raw. Hart challenged for Sid's WWF Championship in a steel cage match shortly before WrestleMania 13, which saw Austin actually attempt to help Hart win, in order to make their scheduled match at WrestleMania 13 a title match. Concurrently, The Undertaker, who had a scheduled title match with Sid at WrestleMania, attempted to help Sid win. Sid ultimately retained, leading to a pure grudge match for Hart and Austin. Following his loss to Sid, Hart shoved Vince McMahon to the ground when he attempted to conduct a post-match interview, and engaged in a worked shoot, expletive-laden rant against McMahon and WWF management. This incident has been cited as one which helped lay the foundations of the WWF's Attitude Era, as well as the starting point of McMahon's on-air character, the tyrannical WWF owner "Mr. McMahon".

At WrestleMania 13, Hart and Austin had their rematch in a submission match that would later get a 5-star rating from Dave Meltzer. In the end, Hart locked the Sharpshooter on a bloody Austin, who refused to give up. In fact, Austin never quit, but passed out from the blood loss and pain. Ken Shamrock, the special guest referee, awarded Hart the match, after which he continued to assault Austin, thus turning heel for the first time since 1988. It was named "Match of the Year" by Wrestling Observer Newsletter and voted "Match of the Year" by Pro Wrestling Illustrated readers. Later that night, Hart confronted Sycho Sid and The Undertaker prior to their match for the WWF Championship; Hart insulted Undertaker and told Shawn Michaels (who was a guest commentator for the match) not to interfere. Undertaker won the match, which ended with Hart hot shotting Sid on the ropes, therefore costing him the title.

Hart challenged Rocky Maivia for the Intercontinental Championship in the main event of the March 31 episode of Raw. Rocky Maivia won by disqualification when Hart refused to release a figure-four leglock applied around the ring post. He faced Austin again in the main event of In Your House 14: Revenge of the 'Taker, to determine who would challenge the WWF Champion Undertaker in a title match at the following month's In Your House 15: A Cold Day in Hell. Austin had Hart locked in his own finishing move, the Sharpshooter, in the middle of the ring when The British Bulldog interfered on Hart's behalf, resulting in disqualification and giving Austin the victory and title match. They met once again in a street fight on the April 21 episode of Raw Is War, in which Austin injured Hart's ankle with a steel chair. The match was ruled a no-contest and Austin afterward continued to beat Hart while on a stretcher in the back of an ambulance.

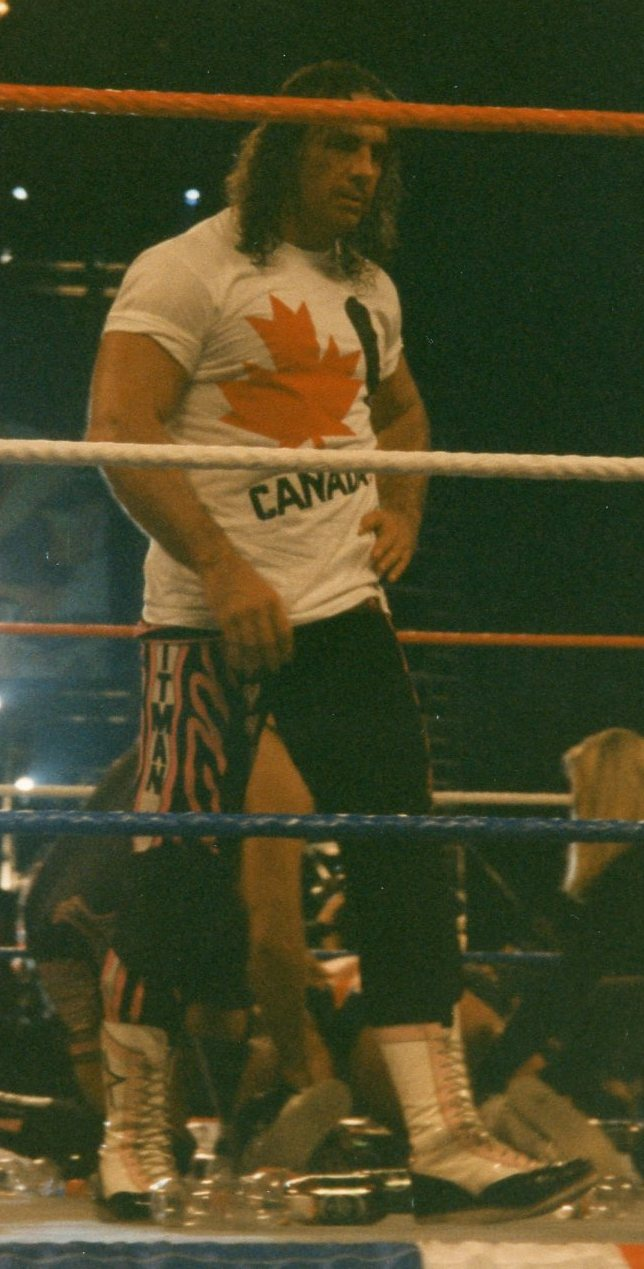
In 1997, Hart became a tweener: generally cheered for by Canadian and international fans, and booed by American fans, while remaining largely consistent in character

In the ensuing weeks, Hart denounced American fans, because of their negative reaction to him in the recent weeks in contrast to his continued popularity through the rest of the world and reunited with brother Owen and brothers-in-law Davey Boy Smith and Jim Neidhart. The family members formed a new Hart Foundation with Brian Pillman; this incarnation was an anti-American stable which was popular within Canada and Europe. As the leader of this stable, Hart routinely carried a Canadian flag to the ring and engaged in promos where he declared the superiority of his home nation; he became so despised by U.S. audiences that they would often throw debris during his ring entrances, interviews, and matches. He was voted by Pro Wrestling Illustrated readers as the "Most Hated Wrestler of the Year" in 1997. At In Your House 16: Canadian Stampede, in Hart's home town of Calgary, the Hart Foundation defeated the team of Stone Cold Steve Austin, Ken Shamrock, Goldust, and The Legion of Doom, representing the United States, in a ten-man tag team match main event. The Canada vs. U.S. rivalry escalated on the July 21 episode of Raw Is War in Halifax, Nova Scotia, where Bret, Owen, and Davey Boy Smith, representing Canada and the Hart Foundation, defeated the team of Dude Love, Austin, and The Undertaker, representing the U.S., in a Flag match. The Hart Foundation's feud with Austin was named "Feud of the Year" by Wrestling Observer Newsletter and voted "Feud of the Year" by readers of Pro Wrestling Illustrated. Hart vowed that if he could not defeat The Undertaker for the WWF Championship at SummerSlam, he would never wrestle in the United States again. The Undertaker agreed to the match, and Hart won his fifth and last WWF Championship after spitting in guest referee Shawn Michaels' face; Michaels swung a steel chair in retaliation, which accidentally struck the Undertaker. Michaels, who, as part of another pre-match stipulation, would be banned from wrestling in the United States if he did not remain impartial as referee, had no option but to count the pinfall, giving his rival Hart the victory.

After SummerSlam, Michaels was pushed as the top heel in the company and negative fan reactions toward Hart in the United States softened somewhat, as he declared: "I'm not so much anti-American as I am just very, very pro-Canadian." In real life, Hart did not like the new Attitude Era, instead preferring traditional values. This was used as part of his character, as Hart would insult the U.S. fans because of the success of the Attitude Era. Hart successfully defended his title against The Patriot, with whom Hart had become involved in a feud as part of the Canada vs. U.S. storyline, at Ground Zero: In Your House, avenging a loss to him on the July 28 Raw. The Canada vs. U.S. feud would conclude at Badd Blood: In Your House, where Hart and Davey Boy Smith, representing Canada and the Hart Foundation, defeated The Patriot and Vader, representing the U.S., in a Flag match. Erstwhile, in a rematch from SummerSlam, The Undertaker challenged Hart for the WWF Championship at One Night Only; after reversing a Tombstone Piledriver attempt from Hart, The Undertaker dumped Hart on the apron when he would not let go of the ropes. As a result, Hart's neck was caught in the ropes, and The Undertaker was disqualified. Hart later cited this as his favourite of all his matches with The Undertaker, and his last great match in the WWF.

In September 1997, Hart faced Terry Funk at Terry Funk's WrestleFest in what was billed as Funk's retirement match. During the Hart Foundation's feud with the Shawn Michaels-led D-Generation X (DX), DX framed the Hart Foundation in vandalizing the locker room of the African American stable, Nation of Domination with racist motifs. In retaliation, during a promo with DX, Hart called members Triple H (previously billed as "Hunter Hearst Helmsley") and Shawn Michaels "homos". Hart later apologized for his participation in the storyline and said that he had been pressured into it, saying, "I am not in any shape or form a racist. And I don't believe it is anything to kid around about. I also want to apologize for any remarks I made about gay people. It was a stupid mistake on my part." Hart successfully defended his title against Nation of Domination leader, Faarooq, on the October 20 episode of Raw. In his penultimate title defence, Hart wrestled Ken Shamrock to a no-contest on the October 27 episode of Raw Is War; while the referee was knocked out, Shamrock put Hart in an ankle lock; members of the Hart Foundation then attacked Shamrock until Shawn Michaels made the save for Shamrock and attacked Hart.

==== Montreal Screwjob and departure (1997) ====
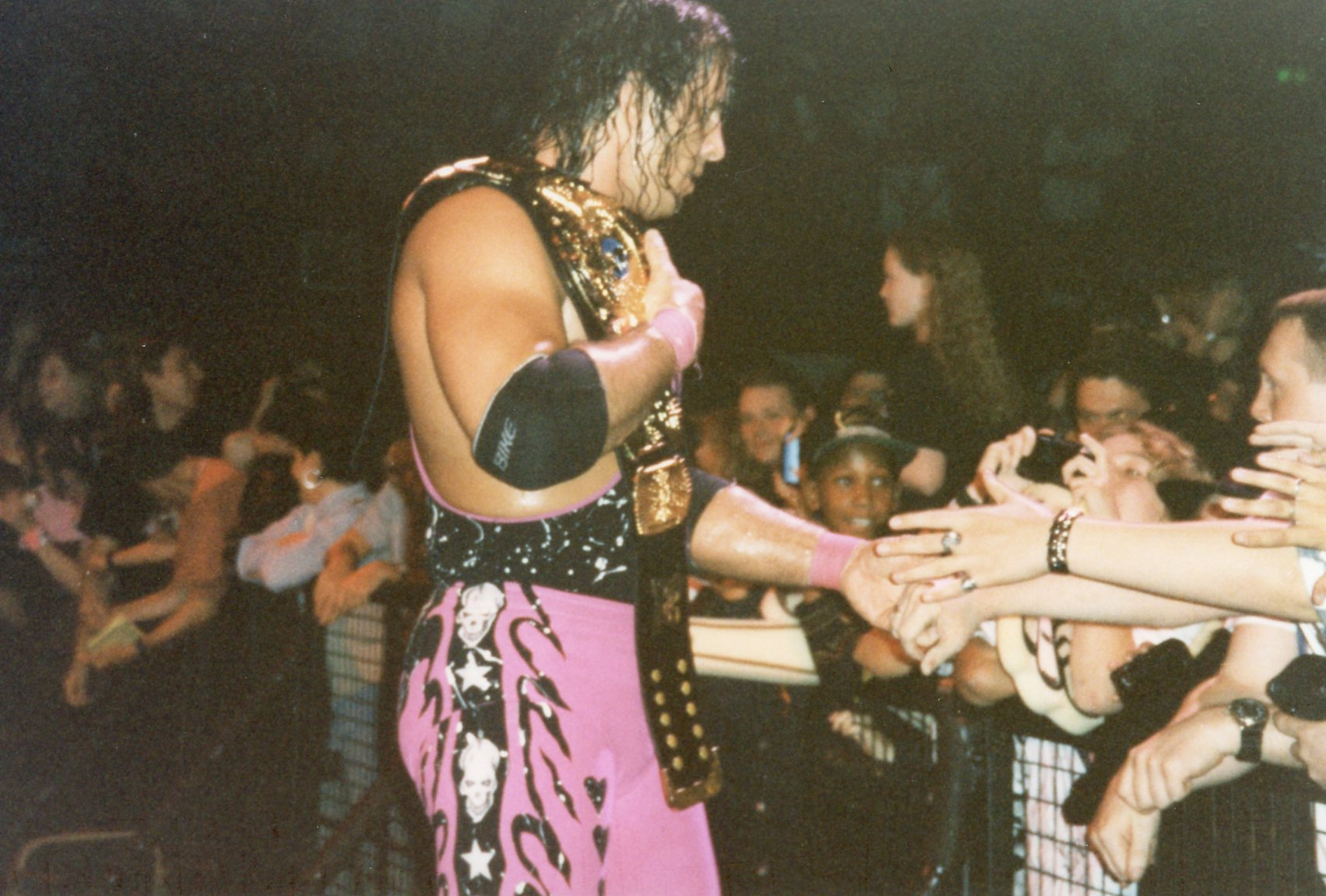
Hart (along with Hulk Hogan) held the record for most WWF Championship reigns until The Rock's sixth reign in 2001

Around this time, Hart's on-air rivalry with Vince McMahon also escalated. A heated ringside altercation between the two led many fans to dislike McMahon, who at the time was being exposed as owner of the WWF more and more frequently on-air. Although Hart had signed a 20-year contract back in 1996, the WWF was in a rough financial position by late 1997 and could no longer afford to honour the contract. Although Hart was arguably the biggest wrestler in the world during the mid-1990s, McMahon also felt that the value of his character was beginning to wane, and he encouraged Hart to approach World Championship Wrestling (WCW) about a contract, hopefully one similar to their original offer. This was despite Hart's reluctance to leave the WWF and willingness to re-negotiate. Hart subsequently signed a three-year contract with WCW. His final match with the WWF would be a title match against his real-life rival Shawn Michaels at Survivor Series in Montreal. Hart did not want to end his WWF career with a loss to Michaels in his home country, particularly with the context of their nationality-fueled feud; he also did not want to lose, forfeit or otherwise give over the belt to Michaels in any other way that McMahon wanted. McMahon agreed to Hart's idea of forfeiting the championship the next night on Raw Is War or losing it a few weeks later.

Although Hart stated to McMahon that he would not take the WWF Championship with him to WCW television and despite insistence from then-WCW President Eric Bischoff that Hart would join WCW with a "clean slate", McMahon was still concerned and paranoid; this led to him breaking his word in what eventually came to be known as the Montreal Screwjob. Even though Hart did not submit to the Sharpshooter, referee Earl Hebner called for the bell as if he had, on McMahon's orders. This resulted in Hart "losing" the WWF Championship to Michaels. The night ended with an irate Hart spitting in McMahon's face, destroying television equipment, and punching McMahon backstage in front of Gerald Brisco, Pat Patterson, and McMahon's son Shane. Hart also confronted Michaels backstage about the match finish. Many behind-the-scenes events leading up to the Montreal Screwjob were filmed for the documentary Hitman Hart: Wrestling with Shadows, released in 1998. WWE has described the Montreal Screwjob as "arguably the most controversial, most jarring moment in the annals of sports entertainment". Hart's likeness would continue to be featured in WWF media into 1998, including the title video of Raw (brawling in a ring within a warehouse), action figure for Slammers Series 1 and the WWF War Zone video game.

=== World Championship Wrestling (1997–2000) ===
==== United States Heavyweight Champion (1997–1999) ====
Hart's three-year contract with World Championship Wrestling (WCW) included a salary of $2.5 million per year (a $1 million annual increase from his WWF contract), as well as a light schedule and a measure of creative control over his television character. A day after the WWF's Survivor Series pay-per-view, Eric Bischoff, while with the New World Order (nWo), announced that Hart was going to be coming to WCW and joining the nWo. Hart made his debut on Nitro on December 15, 1997. He was also heavily involved in that month's Starrcade pay-per-view. Due to a 60-day no-compete clause from the WWF, he served as the special guest referee for the match between Bischoff and Larry Zbyszko; during the Sting versus Hollywood Hogan main event for the WCW World Heavyweight Championship, he stepped in toward the conclusion of the match as impromptu referee, declaring Sting the winner and new champion by submission, establishing Hart as a face in the process. In January, his no-compete clause expired, and his first feud in WCW was against Ric Flair, as both wrestlers considered themselves the greatest professional wrestlers of all time. Hart defeated Flair at Souled Out in his first WCW match. After this, Hart elected to defend the honour of WCW against the nWo, defeating members Brian Adams in his debut Nitro match on March 2, and Curt Hennig at Uncensored. In April 1998, Hart interfered in a Nitro main event between Hollywood Hogan and Randy Savage, helping Hogan recapture the WCW World Heavyweight Championship, turning heel in the process. He became an associate of the nWo, but did not officially join the group.

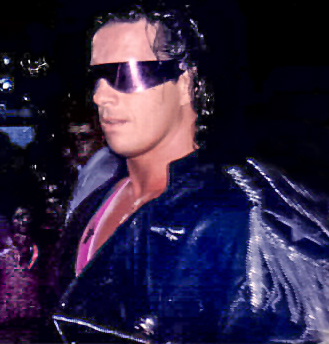
Hart held the WCW United States Heavyweight Championship four times from 1998 to 1999 (a record within WCW), and he was seen to raise its prestige, as many WCW events were headlined by a match for that title during the time period in which Hart was associated with it

Hart competed in his second Nitro match on June 22, defeating Chris Benoit with assistance from nWo members: Hart had attempted to recruit his long-time friend into the nWo, but the offer was rejected. At Bash at the Beach, Hart competed in his first championship match in WCW when he faced Booker T for the WCW World Television Championship. He was disqualified after hitting Booker with a steel chair. He headlined his first Nitro card on July 20, defeating Diamond Dallas Page for the vacant United States Heavyweight Championship, with assistance from nWo member, The Giant. On the August 10 episode of Nitro, Hart lost his title to Lex Luger. He regained it from Luger the next night on Thunder. In the main event of Fall Brawl, Hart was defeated in a WarGames match for the No. 1 contender spot to the WCW World Heavyweight Championship.

Hart subsequently asked the fans for forgiveness, pretending to turn his back on Hogan and the nWo. A match between Hart and Hogan was booked for the September 28 episode of Nitro. During the match, Hart sustained a knee injury, with the bout ending in a no-contest; Sting came to Hart's aid and initiated a match with Hogan. Hart turned on Sting, delivering a DDT, and this bout was also ruled a no-contest. Sting, a member of the rival nWo Wolfpac, was assaulted after the match; this betrayal began an intense feud between Hart and Sting. On the October 12 episode of Nitro, Sting and The Warrior beat Hart and Hogan by disqualification. Hart's feud with Sting ended at Halloween Havoc with Hart controversially defending the United States Heavyweight Championship and (kayfabe) injuring Sting. On the October 26 episode of Nitro, Hart lost the title to Diamond Dallas Page. The two headlined the following month's World War 3 pay-per-view in a title match which Hart lost. Hart regained the title from Page on the November 30 episode of Nitro in a No Disqualification match with help from The Giant.

On the February 8, 1999, episode of Nitro, Hart lost the United States Heavyweight Championship to family friend Roddy Piper. On the March 29 episode of Nitro held at Toronto's Air Canada Centre, Hart appeared in street clothes and derided WCW World Heavyweight Champion Ric Flair, as well as Hogan, for avoiding a match with him. Finally, he called out "franchise player" Goldberg, claiming he could beat him in five minutes and verbally coercing Goldberg into giving him the spear. Hart was wearing a metal breastplate under his Toronto Maple Leafs jersey, which resulted in Goldberg being knocked out. Hart then counted his own pinfall over Goldberg's unconscious body and announced over the mic: "Hey Bischoff, and the WCW, I quit!" In reality, he had sustained a groin injury at the hands of Dean Malenko in November and needed time off for surgery.

On May 23, 1999, the night before Hart was scheduled to make an appearance on The Tonight Show with Jay Leno to hype his imminent WCW return, his brother Owen Hart died in an accident during a WWF pay-per-view. Hart took a further four months off from WCW to be with his family. Hart returned to wrestling on the September 13, 1999, episode of Nitro in a tag team match with Hulk Hogan against Sting and Lex Luger, reestablishing himself as a face in the process. On the October 4 Nitro, Hart defeated Chris Benoit in a special "Owen Hart Tribute Match" at Kemper Arena in Kansas City, Missouri, where Owen had died that previous May. Hart challenged for Sting's WCW World Heavyweight Championship on the October 18 episode of Nitro, but lost the match when he was attacked by Luger. Due to controversy over a series of WCW World Heavyweight Championship matches between Sting, Hogan, and Goldberg at Halloween Havoc, the title was declared vacant. A tournament then took place over several episodes of Nitro. Hart's first round match came against Goldberg the night after Halloween Havoc, with the bout being a tournament match for a berth in the next round, as well as being a match for the United States Heavyweight Championship that Goldberg had won the night before. Thanks to outside interference by Sid Vicious and The Outsiders, Hart defeated Goldberg and won the U.S. Heavyweight Championship for the fourth time. On the November 8 episode of Nitro, Hart lost the title to Scott Hall in a ladder match that also involved Sid Vicious and Goldberg.

==== World Heavyweight Champion and injury (1999–2000) ====
Hart won the WCW World Heavyweight Championship tournament by defeating Perry Saturn, Billy Kidman, Sting, and Chris Benoit at Mayhem. On December 7, Hart and Goldberg won the WCW World Tag Team Championship from Creative Control, making Hart a double champion. Hart and Goldberg lost the tag team titles to The Outsiders on the December 13 episode of Nitro. At Starrcade, Hart defended his WCW World Heavyweight Championship against Goldberg. During the match, Hart was struck with a thrust kick to the head, resulting in a severe concussion. Hart later speculated that he may have suffered up to three additional concussions within matches over the course of that day along with the days immediately following Starrcade, having been unaware of the severity of his injuries. For example, Hart placed Goldberg on the post in a figure four leglock which ended with Hart hitting his head on the concrete floor when Goldberg failed to receive the move correctly. The sum total of those injuries left Hart with post-concussion syndrome and ultimately forced his retirement from professional wrestling. Hart later claimed that Goldberg "had a tendency to injure everyone he worked with". As part of his DVD documentary, Hart expressed regret that "someone as good-hearted as Bill Goldberg" was responsible for hurting him. Referee Roddy Piper rang the bell when Hart held Goldberg in the Sharpshooter, although Goldberg did not submit. Piper simply walked away, leaving both Goldberg and Hart bewildered.

Out of respect for Goldberg, Hart vacated the WCW World Heavyweight Championship on the December 20 episode of Nitro and suggested that he, without the championship advantage, face Goldberg that night to determine the true champion. During the match, Scott Hall and Kevin Nash came to the ring looking to attack Goldberg with baseball bats. Hart convinced them to stop, then hit Goldberg with one of the bats, turning heel once again. The three continued to beat down Goldberg and were eventually joined by Jeff Jarrett. Hart regained the championship, even though it was Roddy Piper who was covering Goldberg (to try and protect him) when the three count was made. The nWo was reformed (now billed as "nWo 2000"). Hart wrestled Terry Funk to a no contest in a non-title, hardcore rules match on the January 6 episode of Thunder. In his final match in WCW, he defended the WCW World Heavyweight Championship against Nash on the January 10 episode of Nitro, which also ended in a no contest. Hart vacated the title in late January 2000 when he was forced to withdraw from the main event of WCW's Souled Out due to his injuries. Hart continued to make appearances on WCW television, generally cutting promos. On the May 3 episode of Thunder, Hart made a run in during an over the top rope battle royal where he hit Hogan with a chair. His final WCW appearance occurred on the September 6, 2000, episode of Thunder, in a promo where he confronted Goldberg on the injury he sustained nine months prior. WCW terminated Hart's contract via FedEx letter on October 20, 2000, due to his ongoing incapacity, and he announced his retirement from professional wrestling 6 days later on October 26, 2000.

Hart and several critics considered his storylines during his tenure to be lacklustre. Former WCW wrestler Chris Jericho attributed this to backstage politics and creative mayhem. Hart cited his "steel plate" segment with Goldberg and his tribute match to Owen, against Chris Benoit, as his two worthwhile moments with WCW. He said he was "proud" to have been WCW World Heavyweight Champion for a short time prior to his injury.

=== Independent wrestling appearances (2001–2009) ===
In 2001, Hart became the on-screen commissioner of World Wrestling All-Stars (WWA), a role that ended prematurely due to a 2002 stroke, which temporarily required him to use a wheelchair. In his first major appearance since recovering, Hart travelled to Auckland, New Zealand to appear at another WWA event in May 2003.

In 2007, Hart signed autographs at "The Legends of Wrestling" show at the Tropicana Field in St. Petersburg, Florida. On the weekend of July 11, 2009, he made an appearance at One Pro Wrestling in Doncaster, England, where he held a Q&A, and then entered the ring to address the fans at the show. On September 27, 2009, Hart appeared in New York City's Manhattan Center to sign autographs during a Ring of Honor event. He spoke to the crowd, reminiscing about some of his more memorable matches in New York.

=== Return to WWE ===
==== WWE Hall of Fame (2004–2007) ====
In 2004, Bret Hart appeared in a WWE game for the first time since 1998's WWF War Zone in the GameCube game WWE Day of Reckoning followed by WWE SmackDown! vs. Raw on the PlayStation 2. In mid-2005, Hart worked with the renamed World Wrestling Entertainment for the first time since 1997, contributing hours of interview footage and selecting matches for his WWE Home Video release, Bret "Hit Man" Hart: The Best There Is, the Best There Was, the Best There Ever Will Be. He returned to WWE programming as a guest on the November 16 episode of web series, Byte This.

On April 1, 2006, Hart was inducted into the WWE Hall of Fame class of 2006 by Stone Cold Steve Austin. He did not appear alongside his fellow inductees at WrestleMania 22 the following night. On June 11, 2007, Hart made his first appearance on Raw since October 27, 1997, when he appeared in a pretaped interview voicing his opinions on Vince McMahon as part of "Mr. McMahon Appreciation Night".

==== In-ring return and second retirement (2010–2011) ====
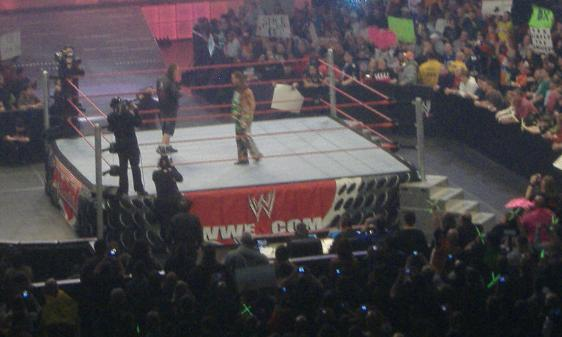
Hart confronts Michaels on January 4, 2010

On December 28, 2009, after weeks of speculation surrounding Hart and his presence in World Wrestling Entertainment, Vince McMahon announced that Hart would be special guest host on the January 4, 2010 episode of Raw. Hart thanked the fans for their continued support, jokingly teased announcer Jerry Lawler about their long-running 1990s feud, and confronted Shawn Michaels and McMahon regarding the Montreal Screwjob at Survivor Series in 1997. Hart and Michaels were able to agree on a truce, shaking hands and hugging. While many cast doubts on the sincerity of their reconciliation, both men have confirmed that it was indeed genuine and not part of storyline. It also appeared that he had buried the hatchet with McMahon later in the night, until McMahon subsequently kicked Bret in the crotch (this was in fact part of a storyline, as Hart and McMahon had been on speaking terms since 2005).

During different encounters the following month, Hart and McMahon reproduced events similar to those that occurred in the Montreal Screwjob: McMahon spitting in Hart's face (as Hart did to McMahon), and Hart destroying parts of the technical equipment that goes into producing Raw (as he did to the Survivor Series equipment). On the February 15 Raw, Hart made a farewell from WWE, but as he left to go inside his limousine, another vehicle reversed into the door of his limo and injured his left leg. On the March 1 Raw, McMahon challenged Hart to a match at WrestleMania XXVI; Hart accepted. The match was later changed to a No Holds Barred match as Hart revealed (with help from "Stone Cold" Steve Austin, the special guest host that night) the staging of his injury. Hart, along with his family, inducted his father Stu Hart into the WWE Hall of Fame class of 2010, a controversial decision that aggravated Hart and McMahon's rivalry in 2010. At WrestleMania, McMahon paid the Hart family to betray Bret. They doublecrossed McMahon instead and helped him lose.

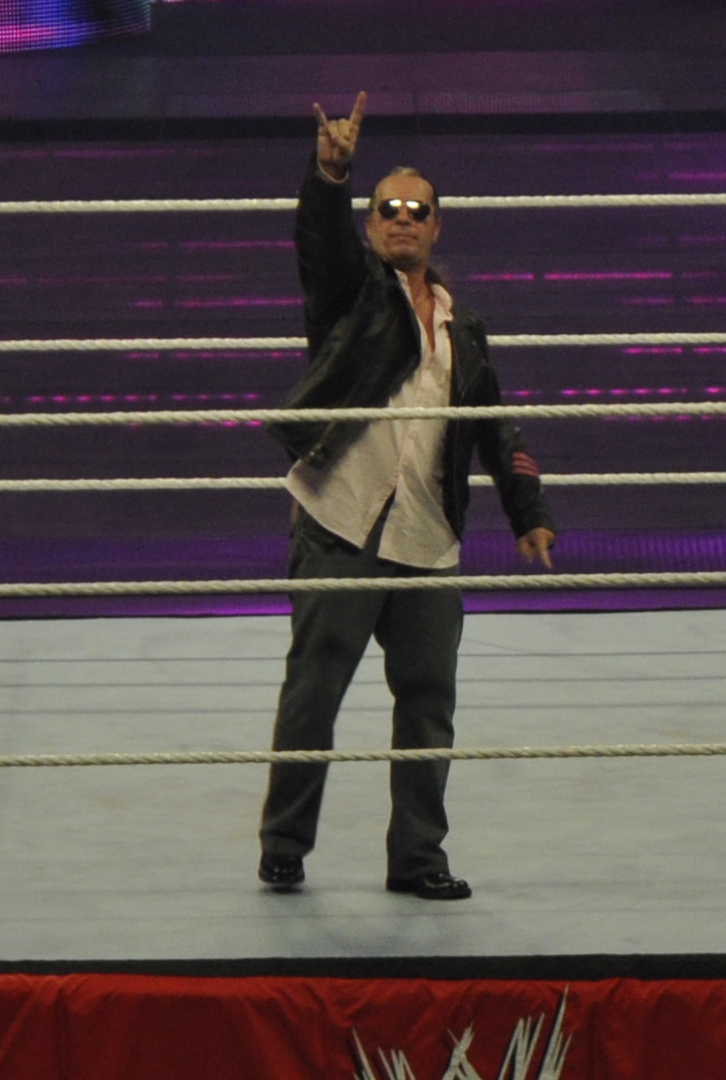
Hart with WWE in 2010

Hart stood with The Hart Dynasty (David Hart Smith and Tyson Kidd), a stable stemmed from the Hart family, throughout their feud with ShoMiz (Big Show and The Miz); they ultimately won the WWE Tag Team Championship on April 26. When The Miz lost a match that guaranteed a WWE United States Championship match to a Hart family member, he chose Bret; with the help of the Dynasty, Hart defeated The Miz to win his fifth United States Championship on May 17 in Toronto, Ontario, Canada. On the May 24 episode of Raw, Hart was named the new general manager of Raw. His first orders included vacating his United States Championship, which R-Truth won, and setting up qualifying matches for Fatal 4-Way, which the injured Batista took exception to and quit. The next week, Hart declared a Viewer's Choice episode of Raw. He was attacked by NXT rookies after firing Wade Barrett and declining to offer them contracts on the June 14 episode of Raw. A week later, McMahon fired Hart as general manager for failing to control the rookies.

Hart returned five weeks later, where it was announced by John Cena that he, The Great Khali, R-Truth, Edge, Chris Jericho, John Morrison and Hart would face the NXT rookies, now known as The Nexus, at SummerSlam. The following week, Hart teamed with Cena to wrestle SummerSlam teammates Edge and Chris Jericho to a no contest. In the SummerSlam main event, he was disqualified for using a steel chair on Skip Sheffield; his team ultimately won the match. On the August 16, episode of Raw, Hart introduced the new tag team title belts to the champions, The Hart Dynasty. Later on in the night during The Nexus vs. Raw challenge, Hart was scheduled to face Justin Gabriel, but was unable to compete after the Anonymous Raw General Manager, citing his disdain for Hart, removed him from the match and replaced him with Randy Orton. On September 25, WWE hosted a tribute event to Hart in Madison Square Garden, where he and the Hart Dynasty defeated Nexus members Heath Slater, Justin Gabriel and Michael Tarver in a six-man tag team match, when Gabriel submitted to Hart's Sharpshooter. In November 2010, Hart's WWE contract had expired.

Hart has made infrequent appearances in minor roles, appearing on the April 25, 2011 episode of Tough Enough. At Over the Limit, Hart came to the support of his long-running 1990s rival, Jerry Lawler, forcing Michael Cole to kiss Lawler's foot. The following night on Raw, Hart refereed the main event, which saw John Cena and Rey Mysterio defeat R-Truth and CM Punk with Hart's assistance. On the August 23, 2011, tapings of SmackDown (aired August 26), Hart served as guest general manager. On September 12 tapings of Raw in Ottawa, Ontario, Canada, Hart teamed with John Cena in a match against Alberto Del Rio and Ricardo Rodriguez, which he won after putting Rodriguez into a sharpshooter. This was Hart's final match.

==== Sporadic appearances (2012–present) ====
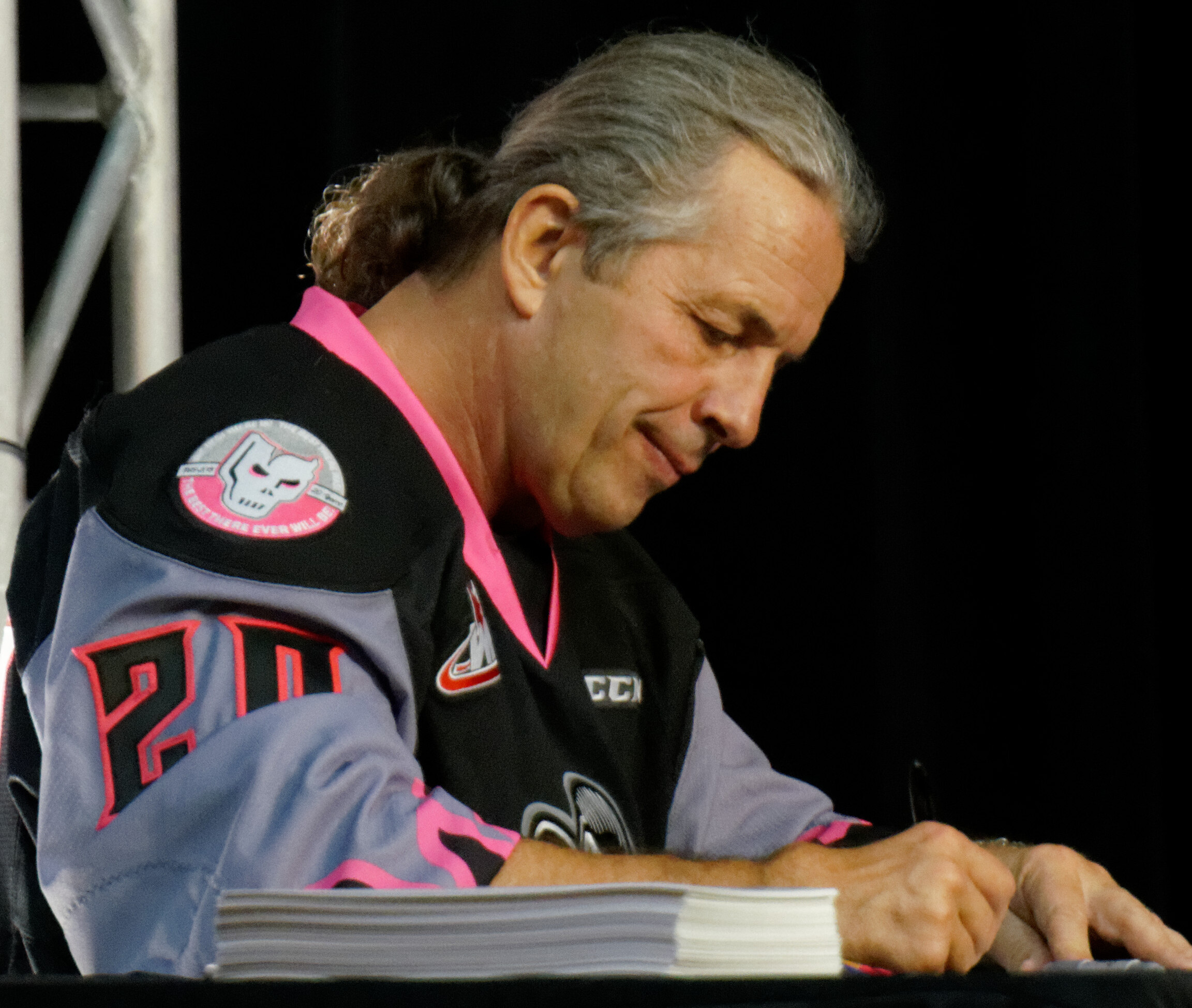
Hart signing autographs in 2014

At Raw 1000 and on the May 4, 2012, episode of Raw he served as guest ring announcer; he interviewed John Cena on September 10, 2012, during which CM Punk interrupted and got into a confrontation with Hart. He participated in backstage segments at the 2013 Royal Rumble and WrestleMania 31. On the post-show of Raw on May 27, 2013, Hart was honoured by the city of Calgary and the WWE with a "Bret Hart Appreciation Night", a celebration of the work he had done in his career. Also present in the ring for this celebration were Pat Patterson, Chris Jericho, Shawn Michaels and Vince McMahon, who each paid their own tributes to Hart. He has also served as an expert on panels, including the March 25, 2013, episode of Raw and at the NXT Arrival pre-show. Hart was in the corner of his niece Natalya on the March 27, 2014, episode of NXT, at the second NXT TakeOver event and at the 2016 Payback event. The match ended when the referee, Charles Robinson, called for the bell as Charlotte had Natalya locked in the Sharpshooter. After the match both Natalya and Hart placed Charlotte and her father, Ric Flair, respectively in the Sharpshooter.

On April 6, 2019, Hart became a two-time WWE Hall of Famer when he was inducted as a member of the Hart Foundation alongside Jim Neidhart. During Hart's speech, an audience member named Zach Madson charged into the ring and tackled Hart and his niece Natalya to the ground, but was quickly intercepted by multiple wrestlers and security, and after several minutes, Hart continued and finished his speech. WWE later released a statement saying that the attacker was sent to the local authorities. In August 2019, Hart appeared at WWE SummerSlam pay-per-view backstage wishing Seth Rollins good luck in his match against Brock Lesnar for the Universal Championship. In September 2022, Hart appeared at ringside for WWE's first UK stadium show in 30 years, Clash at the Castle. Hart returned to Raw on the September 9, 2024 episode, sharing a segment with Sami Zayn and World Heavyweight Champion Gunther.

=== All Elite Wrestling (2019) ===
On May 25, 2019, Hart made a surprise special appearance at All Elite Wrestling's (AEW) inaugural pay-per-view, Double or Nothing, to unveil the AEW World Championship. In July 2023, it was revealed that Hart offered his services to AEW as an agent, but was turned down.

=== Impact Wrestling (2020) ===
On October 24, 2020, Hart was among those who appeared at Impact Wrestling's 2020 Bound for Glory via video message to congratulate Ken Shamrock for his induction into the Impact Hall of Fame.

== Professional wrestling style and persona ==
Hart is nicknamed "The Hitman", and often dubbed "The Best There Is, the Best There Was, and the Best There Ever Will Be". Hart usually wrestled in a pink attire and, during his time as the Hart Foundation, the tag team was nicknamed "The Pink and Black Attack", which Hart continued to use after the tag team's disbandment. This was in reference to the team's ring attire, as well as Hart's signature mirrored sunglasses, which he would routinely give away to a young audience member before matches, following his face turn in 1988.

Hart used the Sharpshooter as his finishing maneuver. In his biography, Hart said he learned the hold from Konnan and Pat Patterson named it. Due to Hart's success, the Sharpshooter is usually used by Canadian wrestlers. Before ending his matches, Hart usually employed a sequence of five moves: inverted atomic drop, Russian leg sweep, backbreaker, elbow drop from the second rope, and Sharpshooter, being known as the "Five Moves of Doom". During his time in the original Hart Foundation, he and Jim Neidhart performed the Hart Attack as their finishing maneuver.

== Legacy ==
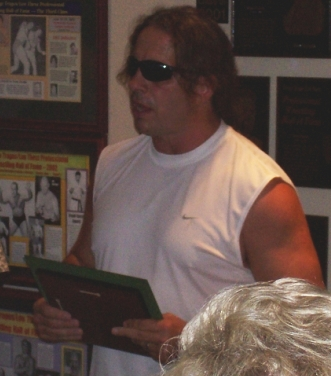
Hart accepts his induction into the George Tragos/Lou Thesz Professional Wrestling Hall of Fame, July 15, 2006

As Hart's WWF career progressed, he increasingly described himself as "The best there is, the best there was, and the best there ever will be" (derived from the 1984 film The Natural), which he would later justify through three claims: he never injured an opponent through any fault of his own; through the entire course of his career, he missed only one show (as a result of flight difficulties); and that he only once refused to lose a match – his final WWF match with long-time adversary Shawn Michaels at the 1997 Survivor Series event, which culminated in the Montreal Screwjob.

BBC and Entertainment Tonight writers noted that Hart is "widely regarded" as one of the greatest professional wrestlers of all time. Sky Sports described his legacy as "one of, if not the greatest, to have ever graced the squared circle". Veteran industry journalist Dave Meltzer called Hart "one of the best ever," and further praised his ring psychology as the best in WWE history (alongside that of Ricky Steamboat, and "maybe Jake Roberts"). Jon Robinson of IGN called him "one of the greatest (if not the single best) pure wrestler to ever walk that aisle". Veteran wrestlers including CM Punk, Booker T and Michael Hayes have named Hart "the greatest of all time", with Hayes noting that he is considered by many as the best Canadian performer ever, if not the single greatest overall.

Veteran announcer Gene Okerlund dubbed Hart "the greatest ever", and stressed that he should appear in anyone's list of the all-time top 10 wrestlers. Viscera commented: "He was the best [WWF] Champion of all time. I mean, as far as international rapport, it's like he's a god." Olympic wrestling gold medalist and six-time WWE world champion Kurt Angle studied tapes of Hart in order to learn the art of pro wrestling; he and Stone Cold Steve Austin have ranked Hart as the best in-ring performer ever (Austin tying Hart with Shawn Michaels). Similarly, former opponent Harley Race described Hart as being "as good as they got". Whilst WWE chairman, Vince McMahon described Hart as having "unparalleled" technical wrestling and storytelling skills, and retrospectively characterized the late 1990s Hart as a performer "who you know is going to give you the best match of the night every time he goes out there". Asked where he would rank Hart among the pantheon of wrestling greats, longtime announcer Jim Ross stated, "Right at the top. Bret was one of the all-time best." IGN ranked him as the fifth greatest wrestler ever. Sports Illustrated ranked him as the sixteenth greatest wrestler ever.

Asked for his favourite opponent, Ted DiBiase said: "In my own era, without a doubt, Bret Hart." The Undertaker named Hart as his toughest opponent, adding: "Some of my favourite matches are with him... I think my matches with Bret were some of the best". Recalling their WWF Championship bout from July 1994, Sean Waltman affirmed: "[Hart] gave me the best singles match of my career, and one of the best matches that's ever been on Monday Night Raw." Curt Hennig stated: "Out of all the matches I had, probably the best match I ever had would be with Bret [at SummerSlam 1991]... I have a good thing with Bret forever." Shawn Michaels, who did not get along with Hart on a personal level, conceded that Hart was an "unbelievable" performer (an opinion shared by WWE executive and former opponent Triple H), calling him a "sheer joy" to work with and saying that the pair's match at WrestleMania XII was one of, if not his favourite WrestleMania bout. Roddy Piper described Hart as "one great man", and "one of the few guys who has a 'total package'". Lance Storm remarked: "[Hart's] matches always seemed more important than the individuals involved in them, and that's what made him great. Bret managed to dominate this sport... by wrestling, which is no easy task, and is to his credit". On Hart's influence, Storm said: "I've always tried to pattern my ring style or work ethic, at least, after that of 'The Hitman'".

Along with Storm, Roman Reigns and Sami Zayn point to Hart as their top wrestling inspiration; Seth Rollins and Jinder Mahal called him an idol, and Jon Moxley cited him as an influence. Edge listed his three idols within the business as "Bret, Shawn and Hulk". Chris Jericho named Bret as his hero (along with Owen Hart), and said he aspired to be "half of" what Bret was. Chris Benoit remarked: "I always emulated him... I spent so many years looking up to, idolizing [Hart]; he was somewhat of a role model to me". Benoit added that his matches against Hart were "up on a pedestal". Koji Nakagawa modelled his character and entire career on Bret Hart by adopting Hart's pink and black attire, an entrance theme identical to Hart's theme song, while also adopting his moveset. Ryback recalled a WWF event from his childhood, saying: "I remember it was Bret Hart against Diesel inside a steel cage in the main event, and I just knew I wanted to be a WWE wrestler... Bret [Hart], I love". Drew McIntyre named Hart his favourite wrestler, while Wade Barrett named Hart along with The British Bulldog, Ultimate Warrior and The Undertaker; he called Hart vs. Bulldog, at SummerSlam 1992, his all-time favorite match. Scott Dawson said that Hart's work at King of the Ring in 1993 made him want to become a professional wrestler. Upon joining All Elite Wrestling for his hotly anticipated return to professional wrestling after seven years, CM Punk wore a Bret Hart T-shirt in one of his first televised appearances, and his first match, against Darby Allin, included several sequences that mirrored a 1994 Hart match against Sean Waltman.

Pro Wrestling Illustrated (PWI) readers voted Hart the greatest wrestler of 1993 and 1994 in the "PWI 500", as well as the "Most Inspirational Wrestler of the Year" 1994. He was voted "WWF Superstar of the Year" 1993 by fans. PWI ranked him No. 4 of the top 500 singles wrestlers of the "PWI Years" in 2003, after Hulk Hogan, Ric Flair, and André the Giant. WWE has also credited Hart as the top "Submission Specialist" in professional wrestling history, and for popularizing the Sharpshooter, named by the organization as the most devastating submission hold in professional wrestling history. Hart's rise to singles success was seen to revolutionize the business; IGN wrote: "After Bret beat Ric Flair for the WWE Championship in 1992, it changed the entire industry, re-setting the WWF back to the days of technical wizardry and reshaping all our notions of what a great wrestling match should actually look and feel like". According to prominent industry historian Dave Meltzer, Hart was "a major draw in the United States and probably more so in Europe". Fellow journalists Bob Ryder and Dave Scherer described him as "an incredible international draw, attracting standing room only crowds in every corner of the globe." Fin Martin of Power Slam also spoke to Hart's drawing power, placing him number 7 in "The 10 Best U.S.-Style All-Rounders", a list that considered drawing ability, along with workrate and promo skills. Vice's Corey Erdman wrote, "1997 was one of the hottest periods in the history of professional wrestling... Hart was the [WWF's] biggest star, arguably its biggest live gate draw globally." Recalling WCW's acquisition of Hart that year, then WWE owner Vince McMahon argued that his chief competitor "could have really built the entire franchise... around this extraordinary star." McMahon felt that WCW misused Hart, which was "fortunate" for the WWF.

On the February 16, 2006, episode of Raw, it was announced that Hart would be an inductee into the WWE Hall of Fame class of 2006. Hart had also been approached by Vince McMahon for a potential match between the two at WrestleMania 22 but declined the offer. On April 1, 2006, Hart was inducted by "Stone Cold" Steve Austin. He thanked every wrestler he worked with (even thanking Vince McMahon) and said he's "in a good place in life." Veteran industry personality and former WWE executive Paul Heyman referred to Hart's oeuvre as "a body of work so spectacular that it is beyond comprehension how brilliant a career he enjoyed".

On July 15, 2006, Hart was inducted into the George Tragos/Lou Thesz Professional Wrestling Hall of Fame, at the International Wrestling Institute and Museum in Newton, Iowa. The induction took place in an immensely crowded and humid display room showcasing one of Hart's ring entrance jackets. The honour is only awarded to those with both a professional and amateur wrestling background, making Hart one of the youngest inductees. During his acceptance, Hart compared this induction to his place in the WWE Hall of Fame, saying "This is a much bigger honour for me." In June 2008, Hart returned to the George Tragos/Lou Thesz Pro Wrestling Hall of Fame ceremony, this time to induct his father Stu Hart. In 2021, Hart would be inducted into Canada's Walk of Fame by Chris Jericho and the Rock.

== Other media and post-wrestling career ==
=== Writing ===
Hart wrote a weekly column for the Calgary Sun from June 1991 until October 2004. Hart used his poetry skills to win over Gord Kirke to act as his legal counsel. On October 16, 2007, Hart's autobiography titled Hitman: My Real Life in the Cartoon World of Wrestling, was released in Canada by Random House Canada, and released in fall 2008 in the United States by Grand Central Publishing, with a U.S. book signing tour. Hart began writing the book in July 1999 with Marcy Engelstein, his longtime close friend and business associate. They did not complete the book until eight years later in September 2007 due to Hart having his stroke in 2002, among numerous other tragedies that occurred during the writing. Hart's chronicle is based on an audio diary that he kept for all of his years on the road in professional wrestling. Hart also provided the forewords to Roddy Piper's autobiography, In the Pit with Piper, Harley Race's autobiography King of the Ring and Dave Meltzer's book Tributes II: Remembering More of the Worlds Greatest Wrestlers.

=== Honorary degree ===
Hart dropped out of Mount Royal College in the late 1970s. In 2018, at the age of 60, he received an honorary degree from the institution (now a university)—a Bachelor of Health and Physical Education/Physical Literacy.

=== Charity and business ===
In 2019, Hart and Calgary Hitmen Team donated $16,300 to Calgary Prostate Cancer Centre. In February 2023, he opened Hitman's Bar in Calgary, Hart's most iconic memorabilia is displayed the bar, including the world heavyweight championship belt he won in 1992 against Ric Flair in Saskatoon, Sask.

=== Acting ===
In 1994, Hart played a prison inmate in a deleted scene from Oliver Stone's Natural Born Killers, restored for the director's cut. From 1994 to 1995, he appeared in Lonesome Dove: The Series television show playing "Luther Root". He has made numerous televised appearances since, including a guest spot on The Simpsons in 1997 (as himself, in "The Old Man and the Lisa") and episodes of the Honey I Shrunk The Kids TV series (along with his brother Owen), The Adventures of Sinbad, Big Sound, and The Immortal. He provided the voice of professional wrestler character "The Hooded Fang" in Jacob Two-Two. Hart also guest starred on the sketch comedy series MADtv in 1997 where he acted as enforcer at a fan's house, appearing with his WWF Championship belt. He later appeared again on MADtv in 1999 and 2000 in an angle with actor Will Sasso in which the two feuded on the set of MADtv and in World Championship Wrestling; this culminated in a grudge match on WCW Monday Nitro, which he decisively won. Hart donned his "Hit Man" singlet, along with additional costume, and executed wrestling maneuvers on villain characters, as part of his performance as the Genie in a 2004 stage production of Aladdin. He reprised the role in 2006. In 2024, he played himself in the American Dad! episode "Under (and Over, and Beside) the Boardwalk".

=== Wrestling-related ===
Hart was the subject of the 1998 documentary, Hitman Hart: Wrestling with Shadows, which chronicled many of the events in Hart's personal and professional life from September 1996 to November 1997, including the Montreal Screwjob and its immediate aftermath. A clip of Hart applying the sharpshooter to Benoit at WCW Mayhem in 1999 is featured in the opening credits of Malcolm in the Middle. In mid-2005, WWE announced the release of a three-disc DVD originally named Screwed: The Bret Hart Story, with the title a reference to the Montreal Screwjob. Hart filmed over seven hours of interview footage for the DVD, which was renamed Bret "Hit Man" Hart: The Best There Is, The Best There Was, The Best There Ever Will Be. The collection was released on November 15, 2005. Hart appeared on many talk shows (including Larry King Live, Nancy Grace, Hannity & Colmes, On the Record w/ Greta Van Susteren) discussing the Chris Benoit double murder and suicide. Hart was a longtime friend of Benoit.

On April 6, 2010, WWE released Hart & Soul: The Hart Family Anthology, which is a 3 DVD set featuring a documentary on the Hart wrestling family as well as 12 matches. It is unique in that it also features previously unseen home movies from the Harts as well as interviews from family members. Also in 2010, The Fight Network produced a documentary titled Bret Hart – Survival of the Hitman produced by John Pollock, Jorge Barbosa and Wai Ting chronicling the rise of Hart, his split with WWE in 1997 and his road back to the company in January 2010. The documentary features interviews with Hart, members of the Hart family, Hart's former business manager Carl De Marco, former sports agent Gord Kirke, and producer of Wrestling with Shadows Paul Jay.

A DVD entitled Shawn Michaels vs Bret Hart: WWE's Greatest Rivalries was released in November 2011. The subject of the DVD was their on-screen rivalry and real-life conflicts, with a particular focus on the Montreal Screwjob. In 2016, Hart starred in the documentary film Nine Legends. Early that year, Hart launched a podcast named The Sharpshooter Show. In 2025, he would appear in the documentary film WrestleMania IX: The Spectacle. The documentary was released on Peacock on April 11, 2025.

== Video games ==
Hart has appeared in numerous video games.

WWE video games
Year	Title	Notes
1992	WWF European Rampage Tour	Video game debut Cover athlete
1992	WWF WrestleMania: Steel Cage Challenge	Cover athlete
1993	WWF Royal Rumble	Cover athlete
1993	WWF King of the Ring	Cover athlete
1993	WWF Rage in the Cage	Cover athlete
1994	WWF Raw	Cover athlete
1995	WWF WrestleMania: The Arcade Game	Cover athlete
1996	WWF In Your House	Cover athlete
1998	WWF War Zone	
2004	WWE Day of Reckoning	
2004	WWE SmackDown! vs. Raw	
2005	WWE WrestleMania 21	
2005	WWE Day of Reckoning 2	
2005	WWE SmackDown! vs. Raw 2006	
2006	WWE SmackDown vs. Raw 2007	
2007	WWE SmackDown vs. Raw 2008	
2009	WWE Legends of WrestleMania	
2010	WWE SmackDown vs. Raw 2011	DLC character For PS3 & Xbox 360
2011	WWE All Stars	
2012	WWE '13	
2013	WWE 2K14	
2014	WWE SuperCard	
2015	WWE Immortals	
2015	WWE 2K16	
2016	WWE 2K17	
2017	WWE Champions	
2017	WWE Tap Mania	
2017	WWE 2K18	
2017	WWE Mayhem	
2018	WWE 2K19	
2019	WWE 2K20	
2020	WWE 2K Battlegrounds	
2022	WWE 2K22	
2023	WWE 2K23	
2024	WWE 2K24	

WCW video games
Year	Title	Notes
1998	WCW Nitro	Video game debut Bret was featured in the Nintendo 64 version of the game, but was not in the PlayStation version
1998	WCW/nWo Revenge	
1999	WCW/nWo Thunder	
1999	WCW Mayhem	
2000	WCW Backstage Assault	

Legends of Wrestling Video games
Year	Title	Notes
2001	Legends of Wrestling	Cover athlete
2002	Legends of Wrestling II	Cover athlete
2004	Showdown: Legends of Wrestling	

== Personal life ==
Hart lent his nickname to the Calgary Hitmen of the Western Hockey League; he was a founder and part-owner. On August 23, 2018, Hart was honoured with a traditional Niitsitapi naming ceremony and named 'Courageous Chief' by Siksika Elder Miiksika'am (Clarence Wolfleg). The ceremony was done as recognition for his and his father Stu Hart's cultural relationship building contributions, such as promoting interest of the sport of amateur wrestling among indigenous youth throughout Western Canada.

=== Family ===
Hart married Julie Smadu (born March 25, 1960) on July 8, 1982. They have four children. The four hearts located on the right thigh of his tights symbolize his children, as do the four dots following his signature. Julie's sister Michelle was married to Tom Billington from 1982 to 1991. Bret and Julie separated in May 1998, and after several brief reunions over the next four years, eventually divorced on June 24, 2002, just hours before Hart had his stroke. Hart married Italian Cinzia Rota in September 2004, but they divorced in 2007 after failing to agree on where they should live. In 2010 he married Stephanie Washington who was 27 at the time. Although at first his children were wary of their new stepmother, they have since embraced her as they realized that despite their differences in age, the love between her and their father is deep and genuine.

His seven brothers were either wrestlers or involved backstage with the wrestling business; his four sisters all married professional wrestlers. Two of his brothers-in-law, Davey Boy Smith and Jim Neidhart, had successful careers in the business. His youngest brother, Owen Hart, had become a decorated wrestler in his own right before his death in 1999, caused by an accident at the WWF pay-per-view Over the Edge. Hart's niece Natalya is a professional wrestler. Fellow professional wrestler Roddy Piper claimed in his autobiography to be a cousin of Hart. Hart has also stated that Piper was the only wrestler to visit him in the hospital after his stroke.

=== Health problems ===
On June 24, 2002, Hart had a stroke after hitting his head in a bicycle accident. The Calgary Herald reported that Hart hit a pothole, flew over the handlebars of the bike, and landed on the back of his head. Hart developed total paralysis on his left side, which required months of physical therapy. Hart has since recovered much of his mobility and is in good health, although he has had other lasting effects common to stroke survivors (such as emotional imbalance). Hart wrote in detail about his stroke in his autobiography, Hitman: My Real Life In The Cartoon World of Wrestling. Hart later became a spokesperson for March of Dimes Canada's Stroke Recovery Canada program. While recovering from his stroke Hart would train three days a week at B.J's Gym in Calgary, which was owned by his brother-in-law B. J. Annis.

On February 1, 2016, Hart announced through a Facebook post that he had been diagnosed with prostate cancer. Jim Ross claimed on March 2, 2016, that Hart had beaten the disease following successful surgery and that it appeared not to have spread to other areas of his body. Hart responded to Jim Ross' comments through Facebook saying that although the surgery was a success and that he and his doctors were optimistic, he would continue to be monitored every three months by doctors until he can actually be cancer free.

=== Personal issues with Ric Flair ===
In October 1993, Hart gave a radio interview in which he said Ric Flair "sucks", and described his workplace, WCW, as "minor league". In his autobiography, Flair accused Hart of exploiting the death of his brother, Owen Hart, and the controversy surrounding the Montreal Screwjob. Flair also claimed in his autobiography that, despite Hart's popularity in Canada, he was not a formidable money-making draw in the United States, a claim which Hart dismissed as "plain ridiculous" in a column written for the Calgary Sun. Hart claimed that he drew greater revenue than Flair, citing his headlining performances on consistently sold-out tours throughout his WWF career, while Flair wrestled to allegedly near-empty arenas. He also criticized Flair on what he perceived as insults to fellow wrestlers Mick Foley and Randy Savage. Hart did acknowledge a decline in the WWF's popularity during the mid-1990s, but he, and others, felt that this was largely attributed to the WWF's well-publicised sex and steroid scandals, as well as WCW's acquisition of former top WWF stars. Hart also took aim at Flair in his autobiography, criticizing his in-ring talents and what Hart perceived as Flair's unsubtle blading. Flair and Hart have since reconciled and are now friends.

== Championships and accomplishments ==
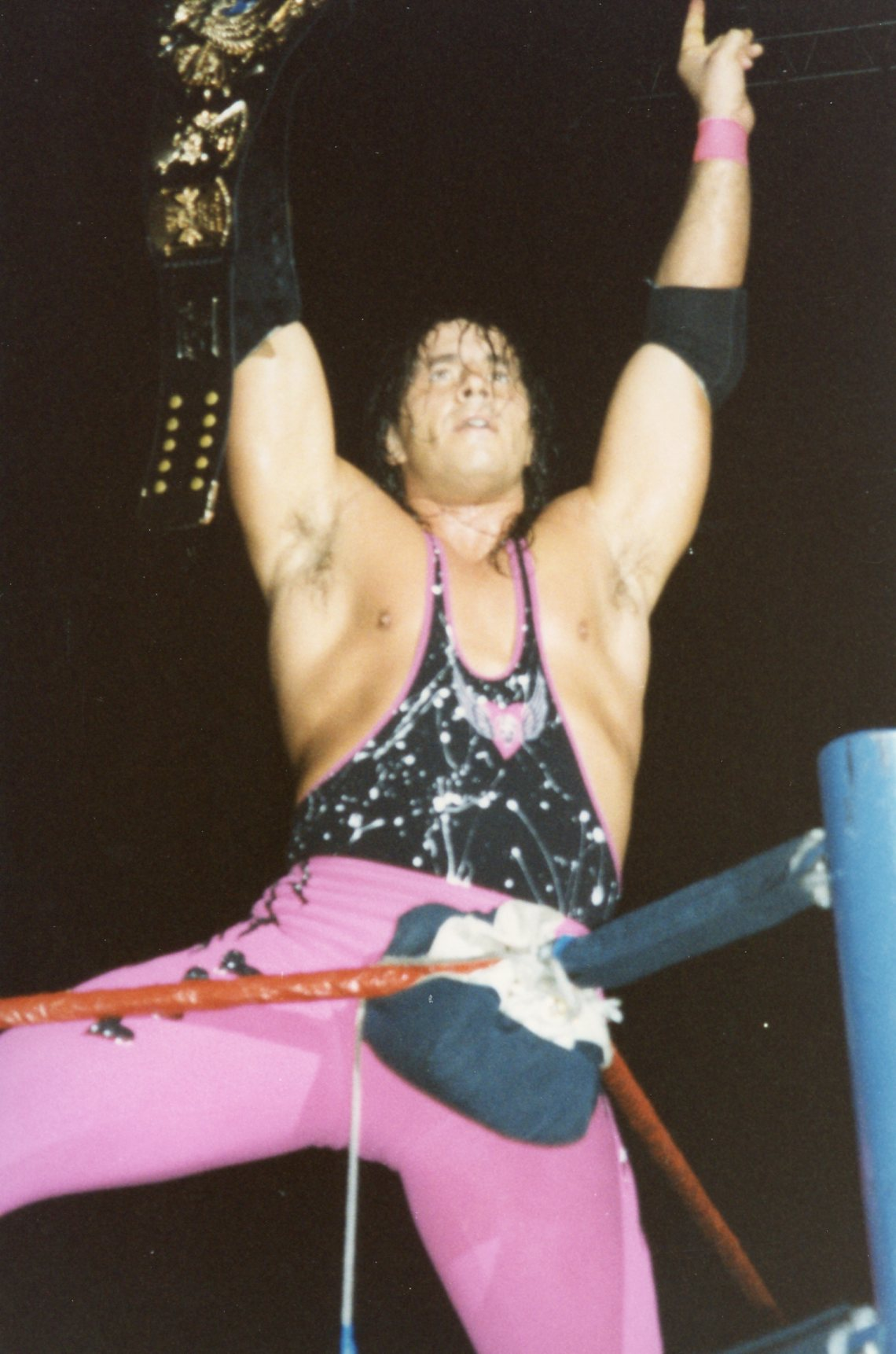
Hart is a five-time WWF Champion, becoming the second man after Hulk Hogan to accomplish this feat

=== Amateur wrestling ===
- City of Calgary
  - City championships, Calgary (1974)
- Collegiate wrestling
  - Mount Royal Collegiate Champion (1977)
- National Wrestling Hall of Fame
  - Class of 2006

=== Professional wrestling ===
- Cauliflower Alley Club
  - Iron Mike Award (2008)
  - Lou Thesz Lifetime Achievement Award (2026)
- Canadian Pro-Wrestling Hall of Fame
  - Class of 2021 – individually
  - Class of 2022 – as a member of the Hart Foundation
- Canadian Wrestling Hall of Fame
  - Individually
  - With the Hart family
- George Tragos/Lou Thesz Professional Wrestling Hall of Fame
  - Class of 2006
- International Professional Wrestling Hall of Fame
  - Class of 2023
- Prairie Wrestling Alliance
  - Prairie Wrestling Alliance Hall of Fame (Class of 2010)
- Professional Wrestling Hall of Fame and Museum
  - Class of 2008
- Pro Wrestling Illustrated
  - Comeback of the Year (1997)
  - Feud of the Year (1993) vs. Jerry Lawler
  - Feud of the Year (1994) vs. Owen Hart
  - Match of the Year (1992) vs. British Bulldog at SummerSlam
  - Match of the Year (1996) vs. Shawn Michaels in an Iron Man match at WrestleMania XII
  - Match of the Year (1997) vs. Stone Cold Steve Austin in a submission match at WrestleMania 13
  - Most Hated Wrestler of the Year (1997)
  - Most Inspirational Wrestler of the Year (1994)
  - Stanley Weston Award (2003)
  - Ranked No. 1 of the top 500 singles wrestlers in the PWI 500 in 1993 and 1994
  - Ranked No. 4 of the top 500 singles wrestlers of the PWI Years in 2003
  - Ranked No. 37 of the top 100 tag teams of the PWI Years with Jim Neidhart in 2003
- Quebec Wrestling Hall of Fame
  - Class of 2017
- Sports Illustrated
  - Ranked No. 9 of the 20 Greatest WWE Wrestlers Of All Time
- Stampede Wrestling
  - Stampede International Tag Team Championship (5 times) – with Keith Hart (4) and Leo Burke (1)
  - Stampede British Commonwealth Mid-Heavyweight Championship (3 times)
  - Stampede North American Heavyweight Championship (6 times)
  - Stampede Wrestling Hall of Fame
- World Championship Wrestling
  - WCW World Heavyweight Championship (2 times)
  - WCW United States Heavyweight Championship (4 times)
  - WCW World Tag Team Championship (1 time) – with Goldberg
  - Fifth Triple Crown Champion (Note: Hart and Goldberg both became Triple Crown Champions upon winning the WCW World Tag Team Championship.)
- Universal Wrestling Promotions
  - UWP Caribbean Tag Team Championship (1 time) – with Smith Hart
- World Wrestling Federation/Entertainment/WWE
  - WWF Championship (5 times)
  - WWE United States Championship (1 time)
  - WWF Intercontinental Championship (2 times)
  - WWF Tag Team Championship (2 times) – with Jim Neidhart
  - King of the Ring (1991, 1993)
  - Royal Rumble (1994) – with Lex Luger (Note: Hart and Lex Luger are recognized as co-winners after both simultaneously eliminated each other.)
  - Middle East Cup (1996)
  - WWE Hall of Fame (3 times)
    - Class of 2006 – individually
    - Class of 2019 – as a member of the Hart Foundation
    - Class of 2025 – Immortal Moment – vs Stone Cold Steve Austin at WrestleMania 13
  - WWF Superstar of the Year (1993)
  - Second Triple Crown Champion (2 times)
  - Slammy Award (5 times)
    - Best New Generation Spot (1994) – "Go Get 'em, Champ!" commercial
    - Best Music Video (1996)
    - Match of the Year (1997) – vs. Shawn Michaels at WrestleMania XII
    - Put a Fork in Him, He's Done (1996) – The Sharpshooter
    - Which WWF World Heavyweight Champion, past or present, in attendance, is Hall of Fame bound? (1996)
- Wrestling Observer Newsletter
  - Best Pro Wrestling Book (2007) Hitman
  - Best Pro Wrestling DVD (2006) Bret "Hit Man" Hart: The Best There Is, the Best There Was, the Best There Ever Will Be
  - Best Pro Wrestling DVD (2011) Greatest Rivalries: Shawn Michaels vs. Bret Hart
  - Feud of the Year (1993) vs. Jerry Lawler
  - Match of the Year (1997) vs. Stone Cold Steve Austin in a Submission match at WrestleMania 13
  - Feud of the Year (1997) with Owen Hart, Jim Neidhart, British Bulldog, and Brian Pillman vs. Stone Cold Steve Austin
  - Wrestling Observer Newsletter Hall of Fame (Class of 1996)

=== Other ===
- Hart was ranked the 39th greatest Canadian in 2004 in a poll by CBC which received more than 1.2 million votes.
- Canada's Walk of Fame (2021)

== Luchas de Apuestas record ==
Winner (wager)	Loser (wager)	Location	Event	Date	Notes
Bret Hart (hair)	The Spoiler (mask)	Toronto, Ontario	WWF Toronto	January 13, 1985	

== See also ==
Family

- Matt Hart
- Mike Hart
- Bruce Hart Jr.
- Torrin Hart

General

- Professional wrestling in Canada
- Sport in Calgary

Other

- Hart Legacy Wrestling
- The Hitman (nickname)
- Stu Hart: Lord of the Ring
- Pain and Passion
- Hart Still Beating

== Sources ==
Print

- Hart, Bret (2007). Hitman: My Real Life in the Cartoon World of Wrestling. Random House Canada (Canada), Grand Central Publishing (US). 592pp. ISBN 9780307355676. ISBN 978-0-307-35567-6 (Canada) ISBN 978-0-446-53972-2 (US)
- Hart, Martha & Francis, Eric (2004). Broken Harts: The Life and Death of Owen Hart. Rowman & Littlefield (Canada), M. Evans and Company, Inc (US). 288pp. ISBN 978-1-59077-036-8.
- Hart, Bruce (2011). Straight from the Hart. ECW Press. pp. 272pp. ISBN 978-1-55022-939-4.
- McCoy, Heath (2007). Pain and Passion: The History of Stampede Wrestling. ECW Press. pp. 336pp. ISBN 978-1550227871.
- Hart, Diana & McLellan, Kirstie (2001). Under the Mat: Inside Wrestling's Greatest Family. Fenn Pub. pp. 200pp. ISBN 978-1550227871.
- Erb, Marsha (2002). Stu Hart: Lord of the Ring. ECW Press. pp. 250pp. ISBN 978-1550225082.
- Grasso, John (2014). Historical Dictionary of Wrestling. Scarecrow Press, inc. p. 444. ISBN 978-0-8108-7926-3.
- Lister, John (2005). Slamthology: Collected Wrestling Writings. jnlister. p. 276. ISBN 1-4116-5329-7.

Film

- Paul Jay (Director); Bret Hart; Owen Hart; Vince McMahon (1998). Hitman Hart: Wrestling with Shadows (Documentary film). Canada; U.S.A: High Road Productions Inc; National Film Board of Canada. ASIN B001NG9GZ0.
- Bret Hart (Subject); Stone Austin; Roddy Piper; Chris Benoit (2005). Bret "Hit Man" Hart: The Best There Is, the Best There Was, the Best There Ever Will Be (Documentary film). U.S.A; Canada: WWE.
