= WWE Hall of Fame (2025) =

Professional wrestling induction event

- Promotional poster featuring Lex Luger, Triple H, and Michelle McCool
- Promotion: WWE
- Date: April 18, 2025
- City: Winchester, Nevada
- Venue: Fontainebleau Las Vegas

WWE Hall of Fame chronology
← Previous; 2024	Next → 2026

The 2025 WWE Hall of Fame was a professional wrestling event produced by WWE that featured the induction of the 26th class into the WWE Hall of Fame. The ceremony took place on April 18, 2025, in Winchester, Nevada at the Fontainebleau Las Vegas in its BleauLive Theater the night before WrestleMania 41. It aired on WWE's livestreaming platforms, two hours after the conclusion of WWE's regular Friday night program, SmackDown.

The ceremony was headlined by the induction of Paul "Triple H" Levesque, which made him a two-time inductee, after being inducted in 2019 as part of D-Generation X. It also featured the inaugural "Immortal Moment" recipient, a new category allowing historical matches to be inducted into the Hall of Fame, given to Bret Hart vs. Stone Cold Steve Austin from WrestleMania 13. This made Hart the first-ever three-time inductee, having previously been inducted for his solo career in 2006 and as part of The Hart Foundation in 2019, and also made Austin a two-time inductee, after his own induction in 2009. The ceremony also had the return of the Legacy wing, which last had inductees in 2021.

== Background ==
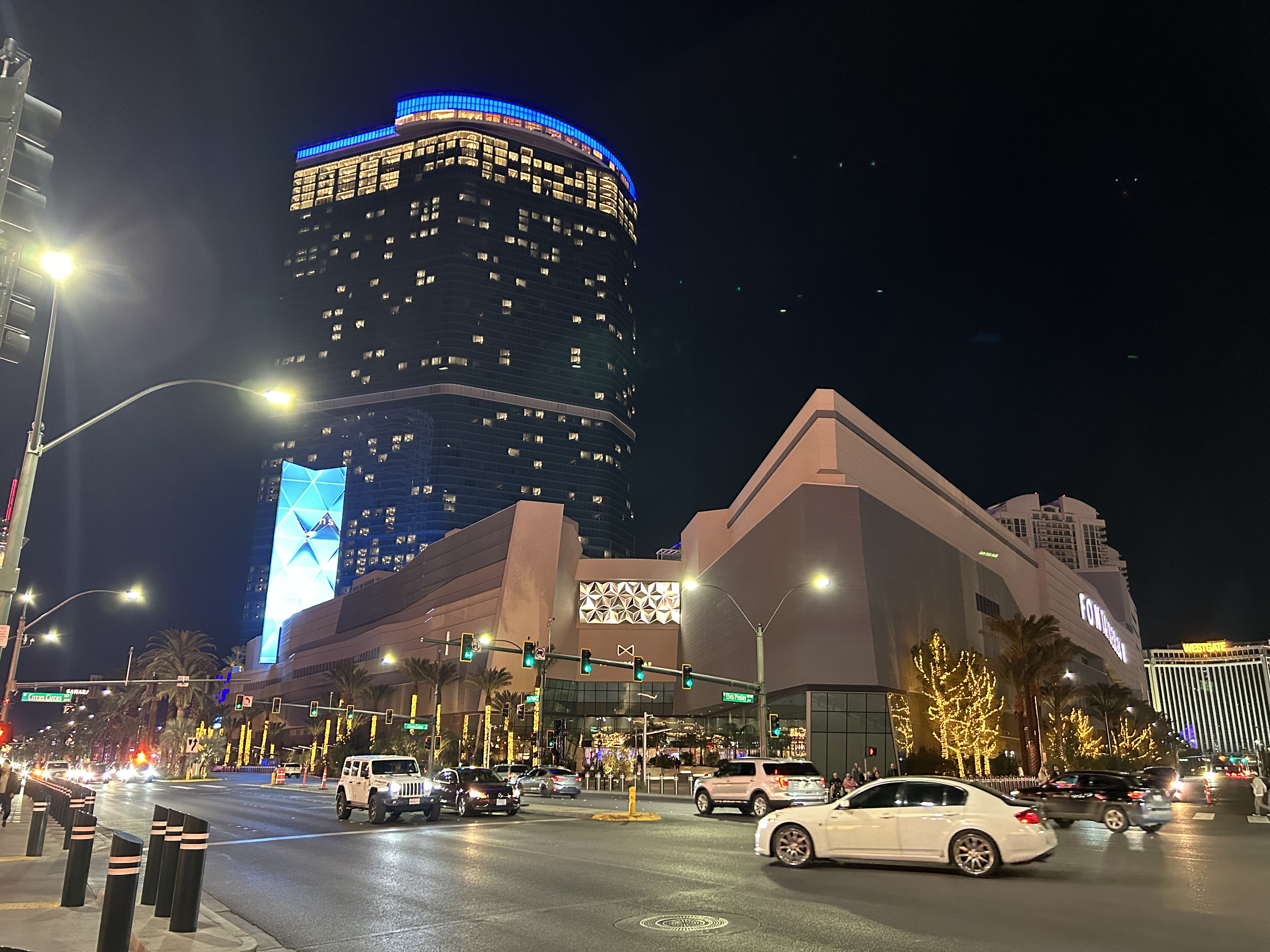
The event was held at the Fontainebleau Las Vegas in Winchester, Nevada.

The 2025 WWE Hall of Fame was held on Friday, April 18, 2025, in Winchester, Nevada at the Fontainebleau Las Vegas in its BleauLive Theater the night before WrestleMania 41. It aired two hours after the conclusion of WWE's regular Friday night program, SmackDown. It was livestreamed on Peacock in the United States, YouTube in all international markets, and the WWE Network in any remaining countries that had not yet transferred to Netflix due to pre-existing contracts, as well as on WWE's social media platforms.

During an event at WWE's headquarters on January 29, 2025, WWE Hall of Famers Shawn Michaels and The Undertaker made a surprise appearance to reveal WWE Chief Content Officer Paul "Triple H" Levesque as the first inductee into the 2025 Hall of Fame. WWE then officially confirmed his induction. This made Triple H a two-time inductee as he was previously inducted as part of D-Generation X in 2019.

During an episode of ESPN's Get Up on February 14, 2025, Triple H made a surprise appearance to surprise The Undertaker and his wife Michelle McCool with the announcement of the latter as the second inductee.

On March 7, 2025, during a special visit to Lex Luger and Diamond Dallas Page, Cody Rhodes revealed that Luger was the third inductee. On the March 24 episode of Raw, The Natural Disasters (Earthquake and Typhoon) were announced as the fourth inductee overall and the first tag team inductee, as it was also revealed that the induction was already planned by Triple H to Earthquake's family during the Class of 2024 ceremony. Luger publicly expressed that he wanted his longtime friend and tag team partner Sting to induct him but WWE and All Elite Wrestling, WWE's rival company that Sting is contracted to, were not able to agree to terms to make it happen.

During the March 28, 2025, episode of SmackDown, WWE unveiled a new "Immortal Moment" category for the Hall of Fame, which honors historic and influential matches. The first induction in this category was revealed to be the no disqualification submission match between Bret Hart and Steve Austin with Ken Shamrock as the special guest referee from WrestleMania 13. This induction made Hart the first-ever three-time inductee, having previously been inducted for his solo career in 2006 and as part of the tag team, The Hart Foundation, in 2019. This also made Austin a two-time inductee after previously being inducted in 2009.

On April 9, 2025, WWE revealed the return of the Legacy wing for the first time since the 2021 ceremony. In a change from past ceremonies that included Legacy inductees, the recipients were announced prior to the event, with Kamala, Dory Funk Sr., and Ivan Koloff revealed as the three posthumous Legacy inductees for 2025. The families of the inductees were also present and acknowledged at the ceremony.

== Inductees ==
=== Individual ===
- Class headliners appear in **boldface**

Image	Inductee (Birth name)	Inducted by	WWE recognized accolades
	**Triple H** (Paul Levesque)	Shawn Michaels	Two-time inductee: previously inducted in 2019 as a member of D-Generation X Nine-time WWF/WWE (World Heavyweight) Champion; Five-time and Inaugural World Heavyweight Champion; Five-time WWF/WWE Intercontinental Champion; Two-time WWF European Champion; One-time WWE Tag Team Champion; Two-time WWF World Tag Team Champion; 1997 King of the Ring winner Two-time Royal Rumble match winner (2002 and 2016); Three-time Slammy Award winner
	Michelle McCool (Michelle Calaway)	The Undertaker	2004 WWE Raw Diva Search finalist Two-time WWE Women's Champion; Two-time and Inaugural WWE Divas Champion; Two-time Slammy Award winner
	Lex Luger (Lawrence Pfohl)	Diamond Dallas Page	Two-time WCW World Heavyweight Champion; Two-time WCW World Television Champion; Five-time and longest reigning NWA/WCW United States Heavyweight Champion; Three-time WCW World Tag Team Champion; Co-winner of the 1994 Royal Rumble; One-time Slammy Award winner

=== Group ===
Image	Recipient (Birth name)	Inducted by	WWE recognized accolades as a team
	The Natural Disasters	None	One-time WWF Tag Team Champions
Earthquake (John Tenta) - Posthumous inductee: represented by his widow Josephine, his daughter Joanna, his son John Jr. and his grandson Joe. One-time NWA Vancouver Canadian Heavyweight Champion and one-time UWA Heavyweight Champion (Vancouver version). Typhoon (Fred Ottman) - One-time AWA International Heavyweight Champion, two-time AWA Southern Tag Team Champion, and one-time NWA Florida Heavyweight Champion.

=== Immortal Moment ===
Image	Recipient	Inducted by	Description
	Bret Hart vs. Stone Cold Steve Austin from WrestleMania 13	CM Punk	No Disqualification Submission match with Ken Shamrock as the special guest referee
Accepted by Bret "Hit Man" Hart and Stone Cold Steve Austin; Bret "Hit Man" Hart – First three-time inductee: previously inducted in 2006 for his individual career and in 2019 as a member of the Hart Foundation; Stone Cold Steve Austin – Two-time inductee: previously inducted in 2009 for his individual career

=== Legacy ===
Image	Recipient (Birth name)	WWE recognized accolades
	Kamala (James Harris)	One-time AWA Southern Heavyweight Champion; One-time ICW Southern Tag Team Champion; One-time IWA United States Heavyweight Champion; One-time IWA Tag Team Champion; One-time NWA Mississippi Heavyweight Champion; One-time NWA Tri-State United States Tag Team Champion (Tri-State version); One-time NWA Southeastern Heavyweight Champion (Northern Division); Four-time USWA Unified World Heavyweight Champion; Famous for his feuds with Andre The Giant, Hulk Hogan and The Undertaker
	Dory Funk Sr.	Owner/Promoter of the Western States Sports promotion Eight-time NWA Southwest Junior Heavyweight Champion; Four-time NWA Southwest Tag Team Champion; Three-time NWA Western States Heavyweight Champion; One-time NWA World Junior Heavyweight Champion; Held the regional versions of several other NWA championships throughout his career Father of Dory Funk Jr. and Terry Funk
	Ivan Koloff (Oreal Perras)	One-time WWWF World Heavyweight Champion; Three-time NWA Mid-Atlantic Heavyweight Champion; Three-time NWA World Television Champion; One-time NWA Southern Heavyweight Champion (Florida version); Seven-time NWA Georgia Tag Team Champion; Five-time NWA Florida Tag Team Champion; Five-time NWA World Tag Team Champion (Mid-Atlantic version); Two-time NWA World Six-Man Tag Team Champion; Two-time NWA United States Tag Team Champion (Mid-Atlantic version); One-time NWA Mid-Atlantic Tag Team Champion; Famous for ending Bruno Sammartino's 2,803 day reign as WWWF World Heavyweight Champion (the longest reign in the title's history); Represented by widow Renee Perras, who attended the ceremony.
