= The Hitman (nickname) =

As a nickname, The Hitman, The Hit Man, or Hitman may refer to:

== The Hitman ==
- Ricky Hatton (born 1978), English former boxer
- Liam Harrison (kickboxer) (born 1985), English Muay Thai kickboxer
- Thomas Hearns (born 1958), American retired boxer
- Thorsten Hohmann (born 1979), German pool player
- Michael Holt (snooker player) (born 1978), English snooker player
- Paulus Moses (born 1978), Namibian boxer
- Neeshan Prabhoo, Trinidad and Tobago chutney musician
- Bob Sanders, American football player
- Junthy Valenzuela (born 1979), former Philippine Basketball Association player

== The Hit Man ==
- Don Mattingly, American retired Major League Baseball player, coach and manager
- Tico Torres (born 1953), American drummer and percussionist for the rock band Bon Jovi

== Hitman ==
- Bang Si-hyuk (born 1972), South Korean musician
- Bret Hart (born 1957), Canadian professional wrestler
- Chris Harris (safety) (born 1982), American National Football League player and assistant coach
- Don Mattingly, American baseball player, coach, and manager
- Harrison Smith (born 1989), American football free safety for Minnesota Vikings
- Martin Kampmann (born 1982), Danish MMA fighter
- Mikkel Kessler (born 1979), Danish boxer
- Rohit Sharma (born 1987), Indian cricketer
- Jermall Charlo (born 1990), American Boxer

== See also ==
- Atieli Pakalani (born 1989), Tongan born rugby union player nicknamed the "Tongan Hitman"
- Michael Norgrove (1981–2013), Zambian born professional boxer nicknamed the "Zambesi Hitman"
