= The Natural Disasters =

Professional wrestling tag team

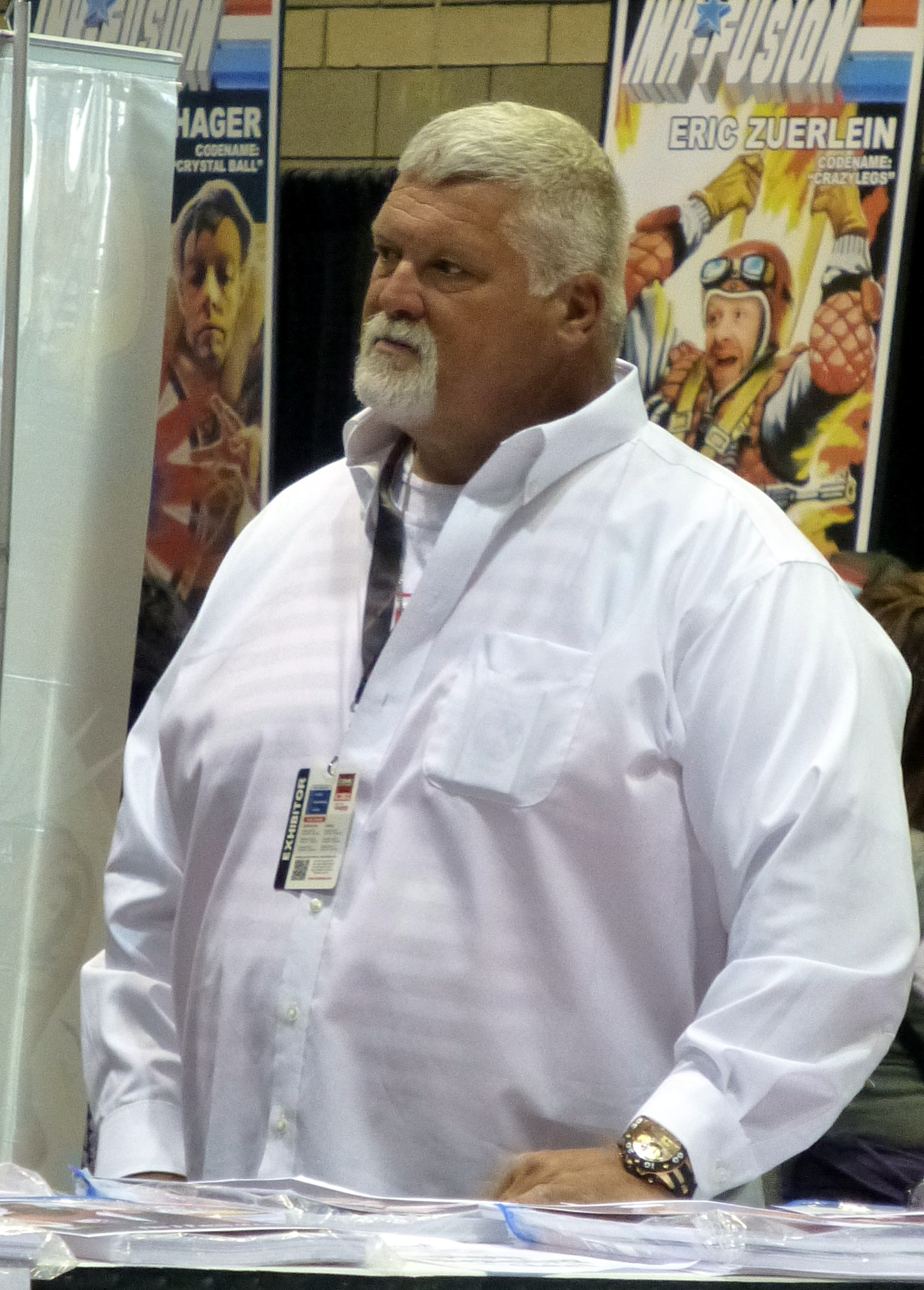
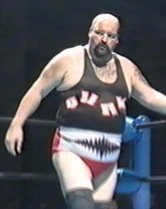
- Typhoon (Left) Earthquake (Right)

Statistics
- Members: Earthquake; Typhoon
- Billed heights: Earthquake: 6 ft 7 in (2.01 m); Typhoon: 6 ft 3 in (1.91 m)
- Combined billed weight: 852 lb (386 kg; 60.9 st)
- Debut: 1991
- Disbanded: 1993
- Years active: 1991–1993

The Natural Disasters were a professional wrestling tag team composed of Earthquake (John Tenta) and Typhoon (Fred Ottman) who worked in the World Wrestling Federation between 1991 and 1993. They won the WWF Tag Team Championship once. They had feuded with each other before becoming a team.

They were inducted into the WWE Hall of Fame Class of 2025.

== Professional wrestling career ==
=== Formation and feud with Legion of Doom (1991–1992) ===
Their precursor to formation happened on a June 1991 episode of WWF Superstars of Wrestling when Jimmy Hart announced he had signed André the Giant to form a tag team with Earthquake. When asked by interviewer Gene Okerlund to confirm, André denied the claims, leaving Hart angry and humiliated. Earthquake responded by attacking André from behind with Hart's megaphone and injuring André's knee.

Jimmy Hart got revenge for the humiliation a few weeks later during a six-man tag team match featuring Earthquake and The Nasty Boys against the massive Tugboat and The Bushwhackers. It was revealed in this match that Hart secretly signed Tugboat, who turned on his partners after a few minutes of action and joined the Earthquake in laying the two New Zealanders out cold with a big splash. After the heel turn Tugboat changed his name to Typhoon and together they became known as “The Natural Disasters”, a name that had been used for Earthquake's team at Survivor Series 1990.

The Natural Disasters faced the Bushwhackers, with André in their corner, at the 1991 SummerSlam pay-per-view, whom they made very short work of. After destroying the Bushwhackers, the Disasters targeted André, but the assault was stopped by the Legion of Doom who ran off the Natural Disasters and kicked off the Legion of Doom / Natural Disasters feud. Later that night, the Legion of Doom won the WWF World Tag Team Championship from the Nasty Boys, which meant that the Natural Disasters became first in line to get a shot at the new champions.

The first big meeting between the teams came at the 1991 Survivor Series where they were on opposing sides in an elimination match. Typhoon was eliminated due to a miscommunication with team member Irwin R. Schyster followed by Earthquake walking out with him, leaving the Legion of Doom as the eventual winners. From November to January the Disasters challenged for the tag team championship on the house show circuit, usually without a decisive outcome. At the 1992 Royal Rumble, they won a title match via countout, but not the title.

=== Face turn and feud with Money Inc. (1992) ===
In February, Natural Disasters' manager Jimmy Hart led Money Inc. (Ted DiBiase and Irwin R. Schyster) to the WWF Tag Team Championship over the Legion of Doom, who briefly left the WWF. The Natural Disasters were outraged that their manager would go behind their backs and get another team a shot at the title, the storyline explanation was that Jimmy Hart used the Disasters' guaranteed return match for Money Inc. When the Natural Disasters challenged Money Inc. they won the fan support as they fired manager Jimmy Hart. The Disasters first got their hands on Money Inc. at WrestleMania VIII, and again won a championship match, but not the title, as the champions were counted out. They challenged for the title repeatedly on house shows until winning it on July 20, 1992.

After losing the title, Money Inc. focused on the challenges from the Legion of Doom, which gave the Natural Disasters the opportunity to defend the belts against new competition. They defeated The Beverly Brothers (managed by The Genius) at SummerSlam 1992, the Disasters' first PPV pinfall in a year. They faced the Nasty Boys and Money Inc., both managed by Jimmy Hart. After the Nasty Boys fell out with Hart, Money Inc. regained the title in October 1992. While the now-babyface Nasty Boys feuded with the champions, the Natural Disasters were phased out of the tag team division, last teaming on PPV at the 1992 Survivor Series, where they were eliminated by Money Inc.

=== Split and aftermath (1993–2001) ===
In 1993, Earthquake and Typhoon began showing signs of dissention, most noticeably at the 1993 Royal Rumble. Typhoon was already in the ring when Earthquake entered as #23 and he immediately went after his tag team partner, focusing only on him until Typhoon was eliminated. The Disasters’ feud never came to fruition as Earthquake left the WWF very early in 1993.

Typhoon briefly stayed with the WWF after Earthquake left. In mid-1993, he signed with WCW and made an infamous debut as The Shockmaster. Typhoon briefly returned to the WWF midcard in 1994.

Earthquake traveled to Japan in 1993 and returned in 1994 for a short “Sumo Vs Sumo” feud with Yokozuna. He also defeated Adam Bomb in a short match at Wrestlemania X. For the few months Earthquake was in the WWF, no mention of the tag team was made. He then went to WCW, where he wrestled as Avalanche at first and later became The Shark and finally wrestled under his real name before leaving. Earthquake briefly returned to the WWF in 1998 as the masked mute Golga, as a member of The Oddities.

In 2001, the WWF hosted a quasireunion of the Natural Disasters as they were both involved in the Gimmick Battle Royal of WrestleMania X-Seven, but Fred Ottman wrestled as Tugboat instead of Typhoon. Commentator Bobby Heenan alluded to their previous alliance. Earthquake wound up eliminating Tugboat. That December, he defeated a jobber in a tryout dark match at a SmackDown! taping.

Earthquake died from metastatic bladder cancer in 2006.

=== Hall of Fame (2025) ===
On the March 24, 2025 episode of Raw, The Natural Disasters was announced by WWE as the first tag team inductee and the fourth inductee overall of the WWE Hall of Fame Class of 2025.

== Video Game appearances ==
The Natural Disasters appeared in WWF Super Wrestlemania (SNES), WWE 2K16, WWE 2K17 , WWE 2K18 & now WWE 2K26 via ringside pass

== Championships and accomplishments ==
- Super World of Sports
  - SWS Tag Team Championship (1 time)
- World Wrestling Federation/WWE
  - WWF Tag Team Championship (1 time)
  - WWE Hall of Fame (Class of 2025)
