= Miiksikaʼam =

First Nations policeman from Alberta, Canada

Miiksikaʼam (born 1948) is a Siksika Indigenous elder, policeman, and veteran from Alberta, Canada.

He is also known as Broken Knife and Clarence Wolfleg.

== Early life and education ==
Born in 1948 in the Siksika Nation, he was given the name Clarence Wolfleg at Old Sun Indian Residential School. He attended high school in Calgary.

== Military service and career ==
After high school Miiksikaʼam enlisted in the Canadian Army. He served with the Royal Canadian Horse Artillery, including with the United Nations Peacekeeping Force in Cyprus and NATO Forces Continental Europe.

After his military service he became a corrections officer and police officer with the Blackfoot Tribal Police, which he eventually headed. His other roles included directing outpatient services at Siksika Alcohol Services and serving ten terms on the Siksika Nation Council.

== Honors ==
In recognition for his service, his community presented him with a headdress, the name Miiksikaʼam, initiation into the Crazy Dog Society, and a sacred bundle and warrior pipe from the Horn Society.

Miiksikaʼam is an elder and spiritual advisor for multiple groups and organizations, including Mount Royal University, Bow Valley College, Health Canada, Veterans Affairs Canada, and the Treaty 7 Tribal Council. He "played a major role in facilitating the creation of the Blackfoot Crossing Historical Park". He received an honorary doctorate from Mount Royal in 2021.
