= WWE Hall of Fame (2006) =

WWE Hall of Fame induction ceremony

- Promotion: WWE
- Date: April 1, 2006
- City: Rosemont, Illinois
- Venue: Rosemont Theatre

WWE Hall of Fame chronology
← Previous; 2005	Next → 2007

WWE Hall of Fame (2006) was the event which featured the introduction of the 7th class to the WWE Hall of Fame. The event was produced by World Wrestling Entertainment (WWE) on April 1, 2006, from the Rosemont Theatre in Rosemont, Illinois. The event took place the same weekend as WrestleMania 22. The event was hosted by Jerry "The King" Lawler. The first two hours aired live on the WWE's website, with the final hour airing live on the USA Network. In March 2015 the ceremony was added to the WWE Network.

== Inductees ==
=== Individual ===
- Class headliners appear in **boldface**

Image	Ring name (Birth Name)	Inducted by	WWE recognized accolades
	**Bret "The Hitman" Hart**	"Stone Cold" Steve Austin	Five-time WWF Champion; Two-time WWF Intercontinental Champion; Two-time WWF Tag Team Champion; Two-time WCW World Heavyweight Champion; Four-time WCW United States Heavyweight Champion; One-time WCW World Tag Team Champion; One-time WWE United States Champion; Co-winner of the 1994 Royal Rumble; Two-time King of the Ring winner (1991, 1993); In 2010, Hart also won the WWE United States Championship.
	Eddie Guerrero	Chris Benoit; Rey Mysterio; Chavo Guerrero	Posthumous inductee: Represented by his widow Vickie and his two daughters Shaul and Sherilyn. Two-time ECW World Television Champion; Two-time WCW Cruiserweight Champion; One-time WWE Champion; One-time WCW United States Heavyweight Champion; One-time WWE United States Champion; Two-time WWF/WWE Intercontinental Champion; Two-time WWF European Champion; Four-time WWE Tag Team Champion
	"Mean" Gene Okerlund	Hulk Hogan	Long-time AWA, WCW, and WWF/E interviewer and announcer
	Sensational Sherri (Sherri Schrull)	Ted DiBiase	One-time WWF Women's Champion; Four-time AWA World Women's Champion; Former manager
	Verne Gagne	Greg Gagne	Co-founder of the American Wrestling Association; Ten-time AWA World Heavyweight Champion; One-time NWA World Junior Heavyweight Champion
	"Mr. USA" Tony Atlas (Anthony White)	S. D. Jones	One-time WWF Tag Team Champion, half of the first African American WWF World Tag Team Championship winning duo with Rocky Johnson

=== Group ===
Group	Inducted by	WWE recognized accolades
**The Blackjacks**	Bobby Heenan	One-time WWWF World Tag Team Champions
Blackjack Mulligan (Robert Windham) – three-time NWA United States Heavyweight Champion and one-time NWA World Tag Team Champion; Blackjack Lanza (John Lanza) – one-time AWA World Tag Team Champion

=== Celebrity ===
Recipient (Birth name)	Occupation	Inducted by	Appearances
William "The Refrigerator" Perry	Football player	John Cena	Participated in the WWF vs NFL battle royal at WrestleMania 2
