= Hammer and Anvil (disambiguation) =

Hammer and Anvil may refer to:

- Hammer and anvil military tactics
- Taskforces Hammer and Anvil of the 2002 Operation Anaconda in the NATO-Afghanistan War
- Hammer and Anvil (album), 2010 album by Pure Reason Revolution
- Hammer and Anvil (comics), Marvel Comics supervillain pair

== See also ==
- Blacksmithing, the use of the hammer and anvil
- Hammer, anvil and stirrup, bones of the ear
- "Hammer into Anvil" (episode) 1967 TV episode of The Prisoner
- "The Anvil or the Hammer" (episode) 2015 TV episode of Gotham
- Hammers Over the Anvil (film), 1993 Australian biopic
- "Between the Hammer and the Anvil" (song), 1990 Judas Priest song
- Hammer (disambiguation)
- Anvil (disambiguation)
- Arm and hammer (disambiguation)
- Hammer and sickle (disambiguation)
