= Gama Singh =

Canadian wrestler (born 1954)

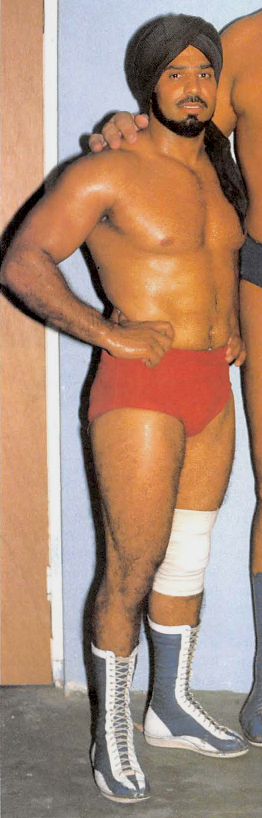
- Singh, c. 1983

Personal information
- Born: Gadowar Singh Sahota; December 8, 1954 (age 71) Punjab, India
- Family: Raj Singh (son); Jinder Mahal (nephew)

Professional wrestling career
- Ring name(s): Gama Singh; Great Gama
- Billed height: 5 ft 10 in (178 cm)
- Billed weight: 225 lb (102 kg)
- Trained by: Bill Persack; Stu Hart
- Debut: 1973
- Retired: 2020

Gadowar Singh Sahota (Punjabi: ਗਦੋਵਰ ਸਿੰਘ ਸਹੋਤਾ; born December 8, 1954) is an Indian retired professional wrestler known as Gama Singh (Punjabi: ਗਾਮਾ ਸਿੰਘ) and Great Gama. Sahota was a villainous mainstay and top attraction in Stu Hart's Stampede Wrestling in Calgary for much of the 1970s and 1980s. Sahota also wrestled internationally in Japan, South Africa, Germany, Kuwait, Dubai, Oman, Australia, the United States and the Caribbean. He also worked sporadically, mostly on overseas tours, for Vince McMahon and the World Wrestling Federation (WWF) from 1980 to 1986. His nephew is former WWE Champion Jinder Mahal. Singh made a brief comeback of sorts in 2018, when he signed with Impact Wrestling as the manager for a stable of Indian wrestlers known as the Desi Hit Squad, but quietly left in 2020.

== Early life ==
His father emigrated to Canada from Punjab, India, with his family joining him in 1963. Sahota went to school in Merritt, British Columbia and excelled in amateur wrestling.

== Professional wrestling career ==
=== Early career (1973–1974) ===
In the early-1970s, Sahota met Bill Persack, an old time wrestler at a Vancouver YMCA; Persack had watched him wrestle in the amateur ranks and agreed to train him. Training Singh for six months, Persack suggested he go to Calgary, Alberta and Stu Hart's Stampede Wrestling to further his career. Upon moving to Calgary and meeting with Stu Hart, Sahota began training with Carlos Colón, debuting in Stampede Wrestling in 1973 as Gadabra Sahota. He would first compete under his own name, but by 1974 would take on the name "Great Gama", in reference to the great Indian star at the turn of the 20th century.

=== Stampede Wrestling (1973–1990) ===
Beginning his wrestling career in 1973, Gama Singh was one of the most hated wrestlers of all time in the Stampede Wrestling territory. Singh would first find success in the tag team ranks, winning Stampede's Tag Titles on two occasions, before going on to feud with the Dynamite Kid, taking the Mid-Heavyweight title from him in a ladder match. His most famous championship run, however, would be with Stampede Wrestling's British Commonwealth Mid-Heavyweight Championship, which he would win six times in the 1980s; with title victories over future renowned stars such as Davey Boy Smith, Owen Hart and Chris Benoit.

Also in the 1980s Gama was a founding member and leader of the hated Karachi Vice stable, which also included Makhan Singh, Steve DiSalvo, Vokhan Singh, Kerry Brown, Rhonda Singh, Ron Starr and managers JR Foley and Abu Wizal. A much reviled play on the popular 80s TV series Miami Vice and the city of Karachi in Pakistan; the Karachi Vice would dominate Stampede Wrestling in the late 1980s, becoming a cult sensation within Calgary. In an era when wrestling was treated as a real sport rather than spectacle, Gama Singh incensed much hatred as a wrestling villain in Calgary, receiving racist threats and often encountered people swearing at him on the street. Stampede wrestling would be purchased by Vince McMahon's World Wrestling Federation (WWF) in 1984, but returned under Bruce Hart running with Gama as one of the top attractions until 1990.

=== NWA All-Star Wrestling (1977–1979) ===
Aside from Stampede Wrestling, Singh spent much of the late 1970s in Vancouver's All-Star Wrestling. He mostly competed in Tag Team bouts with partners such as Guy Mitchell and Buck Zumhofe; culminating in a Tag Title win with partner Igor Volkoff.

=== International career (1978–1997) ===
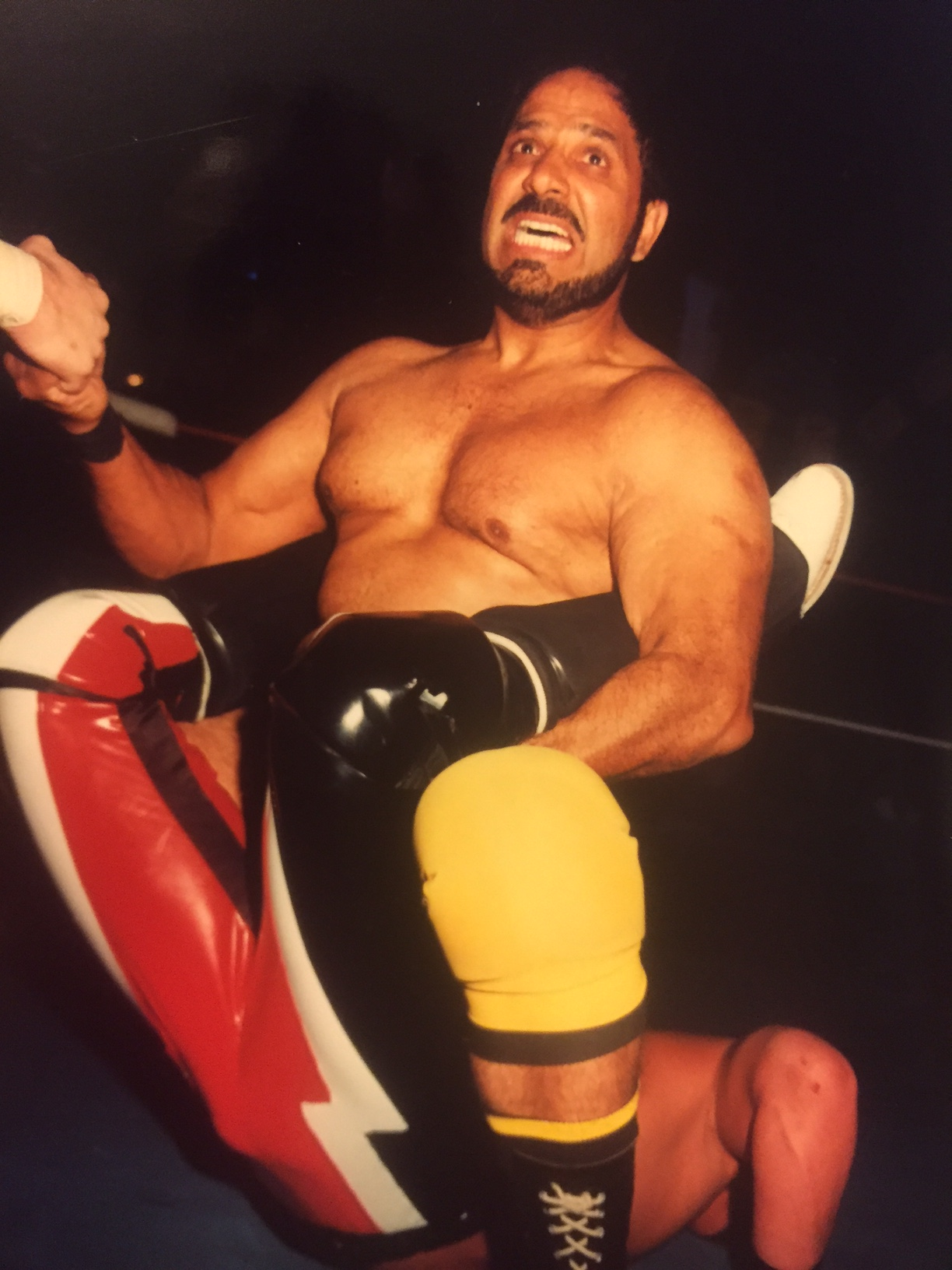
Singh applying a Boston crab to his opponent

Apart from competing in the odd NWA affiliated promotion in the United States; Singh also took part in several tours of NJPW in Japan in the late 1970s, often teaming with Tiger Jeet Singh, and taking on greats such as Tatsumi Fujinami, Seiji Sakaguchi and Riki Choshu. At various times in his career, Gama worked for WWC and various other promotions in the Caribbean as well; once winning the WWC Caribbean Heavyweight Championship from Ciclon Negro in Puerto Rico in 1980. He would also prove very popular in South Africa, engaging in tours which included bouts against his friend Bad News Allen in 1994; and also competed for WPW in Germany in the mid-1990s, teaming with longtime associate 'Champagne' Gerry Morrow. Singh would return to Japan in 1997 for New Tokyo Pro Wrestling, making this his last Japanese tour.

=== World Wrestling Federation/WWF (1984–1986) ===
In the early eighties, Vince McMahon, Jr. widely expanded the WWE and was looking for an Indian wrestler to work on various tours in the Middle East. Gama Singh began working for Jack Tunney in Toronto and then worked several overseas tours for the WWF in Kuwait, United Arab Emirates, Oman, Australia and Hawaii. While in the United States in 1984/1985, Singh would mostly compete in undercard matches on WWF house-shows. He would, however, appear on WWF television defeating Johnny Rodz on Prime Time Wrestling, and also appeared on the June 27, 1985 edition of WWF's Tuesday Night Titans; interviewed by McMahon and accompanied by an Indian Rock Python.

=== Later career (1994-2010) ===
After touring in South Africa in 1994, Singh worked in the independents in Western Canada and Manitoba. In 2001, he retired from wrestling full-time. He occasionally wrestled in Edmonton until 2010.

=== Impact Wrestling (2018–2020) ===
Singh signed a deal with Impact Wrestling in January 2018 as a manager of the Desi Hit Squad with Rohit Raju, Gursinder Singh, Mahabali Shera and his son Raj Singh, but when COVID-19 pandemic travel restrictions began in 2020, he remained in Canada, and did not return to Impact once it resumed tapings in Nashville, quietly leaving the company.

== Personal life ==
Gama started investing money in real estate eventually becoming a renowned real estate developer in Calgary. His brother Akam would also become a professional wrestler, as would his son, Raj Singh. His nephew Yuvraj Singh Dhesi, would go on to the WWE, as Jinder Mahal and win the WWE Championship in 2017.

He and his family are the subject of Akash Sherman's documentary film Singhs in the Ring, which premiered at the 2025 Calgary International Film Festival.

== Championships and accomplishments ==
- Central States Wrestling
  - NWA Central States Tag Team Championship (1 time) – with Bob Brown
- NWA All-Star Wrestling
  - NWA Canadian Tag Team Championship (Vancouver version) (1 time) - with Igor Volkoff
- Prairie Wrestling Alliance
  - PWA Hall of Fame - 2008
- Stampede Wrestling
  - Stampede Wrestling British Commonwealth Mid-Heavyweight Championship (6 times)
  - Stampede Wrestling International Tag Team Championship (3 times) - with Ed Morrow (2) and Crary Stevenson (1)
  - Stampede Wrestling World Mid-Heavyweight Championship (3 times)
- World Wrestling Council
  - WWC Caribbean Heavyweight Championship (1 time)
  - WWC Trinidad and Tobago Tag Team Championship (1 time) - with Victor Jovica
