= The British Bulldogs =

Professional wrestling tag team

- Tom Billington (Dynamite Kid, left) and David Smith (Davey Boy Smith, right)

Tag team
- Members: David Smith; Tom Billington; Matilda (bulldog); Winston (bulldog)
- Billed heights: Smith: 1.85 m (6 ft 1 in); Billington: 1.73 m (5 ft 8 in)
- Combined billed weight: 218 kg (481 lb)
- Billed from: Wigan, England
- Debut: 1983
- Disbanded: 1990

The British Bulldogs were a professional wrestling tag team consisting of cousins Davey Boy Smith and Dynamite Kid. They competed throughout the 1980s in Britain, North America and Japan and have consistently ranked among the top tag teams in history. Both men died prematurely. (Note: The National Cancer Institute define a premature death as one that occurs before the age of 75 as does The Lancet)

== Background ==
David Smith and Tom Billington were first cousins from Wigan, England, with Billington's father being the brother of Smith's mother. In the 1970s, Smith and Billington both began their careers in Britain. The two were soon invited to join Stampede Wrestling in Canada by talent scout Bruce Hart. Billington went to Canada first and made a revolutionary impact in Stampede with his effortlessly fluid technical wrestling style, and had a feud with his future brother-in-law, Bret Hart. Smith came to Stampede in the early 1980s. During their time together in Stampede, Smith and Billington began a heated feud as Billington provoked Smith by claiming he was "a test-tube baby".

== History ==
=== Early years ===
The Billington-Smith feud continued in New Japan Pro-Wrestling, where they became involved in a three-way feud that also involved The Cobra over the NWA World Junior Heavyweight Championship. After they settled the feud, the two started to team as the British Bulldogs both in NJPW and Stampede Wrestling. In March 1984, the Bulldogs won the Stampede International Tag Team Championship for the first time. In 1984, the two left NJPW to go to its bitter rival All Japan Pro Wrestling, effectively severing all ties to New Japan.

=== World Wrestling Federation (1985–1988) ===
In 1984, Vince McMahon purchased Stampede Wrestling. The buyout meant that the British Bulldogs joined the World Wrestling Federation along with Smith's brother-in-law Bret Hart and Jim Neidhart (The Hart Foundation). Initially the Bulldogs still toured with AJPW, but soon after they became WWF-exclusive.

The British Bulldogs' first feud was with the Hart Foundation, whom they knew from their Stampede days, and thus they were able to produce a series of outstanding matches that helped to elevate both teams. The Bulldogs' next major feud was with the WWF World Tag Team Champions, "The Dream Team" of Greg Valentine and Brutus Beefcake. The Bulldogs wrestled Valentine and Beefcake for close to a year, usually almost winning the tag title. The stage was set for a "final" tag title match at WrestleMania 2. With "Captain" Lou Albano and Ozzy Osbourne in their corner, the duo won the WWF World Tag Team Championship.

The Bulldogs continued their feud with the Dream Team and also defended regularly against the former championship team of The Iron Sheik and Nikolai Volkoff. In December 1986, Billington suffered a serious back injury during a match in Hamilton, Ontario, forcing him out of the ring for a longer period of time (during this period Smith defended the title with various replacement partners). On 26 January 1987, the Bulldogs lost the title to the Hart Foundation in a match that saw Billington so debilitated that he was carried to the ring by Smith and saw little physical action after being "knocked out" by the megaphone of the Hart Foundation's manager Jimmy Hart before he even got into the ring. "Evil Referee" Danny Davis then allowed the Foundation to continually double-team Smith in order to get the win (all the while continuing to "check" on Billington, leaving the double teaming to take place). The match aired on 7 February on WWF Superstars of Wrestling.

After being given time off to recuperate, the Bulldogs returned to the ring to continue their feud with the Hart Foundation and Davis (who, in the storyline, cheated to help the Hart Foundation win the title). The teams met at WrestleMania III, where the Bulldogs teamed with Tito Santana to take on the trio. The Harts and Davis won the match when Davis hit Smith with Jimmy Hart's megaphone behind the referee's back and covered him for the win.

Toward the end of the Bulldogs' title reign, they were given a bulldog named Matilda, who accompanied them to the ring. She was central to their feud with The Islanders (Haku and Tama) who along with their manager Bobby "The Brain" Heenan "dognapped" her. After rescuing her, the Bulldogs teamed with Koko B. Ware (and his parrot "Frankie") in a six-man tag team match against The Islanders and Bobby Heenan at Wrestlemania IV. The match ended with a loss as Heenan covered Koko for the 3-count. The Bulldogs then feuded with The Rougeau Brothers (Jacques and Raymond), which included wrestling the first match at the inaugural SummerSlam event at Madison Square Garden which ended in a time limit (20 minute) draw.

The Bulldogs' last pay-per-view appearance was at the 1988 Survivor Series. They wrestled in a twenty-man (ten-team) tag team elimination match. The Powers of Pain won the match by eliminating the heel team Los Conquistadores, thus giving their team (which included The Bulldogs who had earlier been eliminated when Smash pinned Billington) the victory.

The Bulldogs left the WWF after backstage altercations with The Rougeau Brothers. Jacques Rougeau knocked several of Billington's teeth out with a surprise punch. Billington claimed it was a dispute with WWF management over issuing of complimentary plane tickets that led to their leaving.

=== Stampede Wrestling and All Japan Pro Wrestling (1988–1990) ===
After leaving the WWF, the Bulldogs returned to Stampede Wrestling and also resumed touring with All Japan Pro Wrestling, where they had moderate success as a tag team. They had feuds with the Cuban Commandos and Karachi Vice in Stampede and won the Stampede International Tag Team Championship for the second time on 12 December 1988.

After losing the championship to Karachi Vice on 30 December 1988, Billington became involved in a brutal feud with Johnny Smith in February 1989, after Johnny interfered and attacked Billington, before cutting his hair. On 2 February 1989, the Bulldogs wrestled The Rock 'n' Roll Express to a 30-minute time limit draw refereed by Pat O'Connor for Central States Wrestling in Kansas City, Kansas.

On 5 May 1989, the Bulldogs split up in Stampede during a chain match between Dynamite Kid and Johnny Smith. Bulldog Bob Brown interfered in the match and hit Dynamite with a kendo stick from behind, prompting Davey Boy to attack Brown, but just as he took the stick from Brown, Dynamite turned around and saw Davey Boy with the stick, thinking he hit him from behind. This led to Dynamite turning on Davey Boy and joining forces with Johnny forming The British Bruisers. Despite the Bulldogs' split in Stampede, they remained a team in AJPW at the request of Giant Baba. Their last match as a team was held on 28 January 1990, as they teamed up with Tiger Mask II to defeat Jumbo Tsuruta, Yoshiaki Yatsu and Masanobu Fuchi.

In September 1990, Smith abruptly withdrew the Bulldogs from AJPW's annual World's Strongest Tag Determination League by returning to the WWF, and fabricating to the All-Japan office that Billington had been in a serious car accident and couldn't compete. Since Smith had trademarked the term "The British Bulldog" during the Bulldogs' previous run in the WWF, he decided to return to the WWF as The British Bulldog and sent people to the United Kingdom to warn the promoter every time a flyer was distributed promoting Billington as a "British Bulldog." As a result of these actions, Billington passionately despised Smith for a long time. Johnny Smith took Davey Boy Smith's spot in the World's Strongest Tag Determination League, and the duo (known as The British Bruisers) continued to compete in All-Japan Pro Wrestling. The duo managed to capture the All Asia Tag Team Championship, but the partnership was short-lived; the years of steroid abuse, working a high-impact style and cocaine usage caught up with Billington and he announced his retirement on 6 December 1991, although he did make an occasional comeback, wrestling his last match on 10 October 1996.

After the breakup of The British Bulldogs tag team, Smith wrestled for the World Wrestling Federation (WWF) 1990–1992, 1994–1997 and 1999–2000, and for World Championship Wrestling (WCW) in 1993 and 1998.

Smith died of a heart attack on 18 May 2002 at the age of 39. Billington, who had been in a wheelchair since August 1997, died on 5 December 2018 on his 60th birthday.

== Championships and accomplishments ==
- All Japan Pro Wrestling
  - World's Strongest Tag Determination League Fighting Spirit Award (1984, 1985)
- Pro Wrestling Illustrated
  - Ranked #5 in the top 100 tag teams of the "PWI Years" in 2003
- Stampede Wrestling
  - Stampede International Tag Team Championship (2 times)
- World Wrestling Federation
  - WWF World Tag Team Championship (1 time)

== Other media ==
The British Bulldogs were made into action figures, first in 1986 during the LJN WWF Wrestling Superstars line and in the mid-2000s Classic Superstars line by Jakks Pacific. They were available separately as well as packaged together. The Classic Superstars double pack also included their bulldog mascot, Matilda. Both versions are highly sought after by collectors and prices can be well over hundreds of dollars in mint condition especially for Billington, as figures of him were not produced as much as Smith, who gained fame in both WWF and WCW after the Bulldogs' split while Billington wrestled primarily overseas, most notably in Japan and whose career was cut short due to injuries. Many collectors who have obtained the figures consider them among their most prized pieces.

== See also ==
- Animals in professional wrestling
- Owen Hart and the British Bulldog
