= Anvil (disambiguation) =

An anvil is a tool used by metalworkers such as blacksmiths.

Anvil or The Anvil may also refer to:

== Anatomy ==
- Anvil (bone), bone in the ear

== Business ==
- Anvil Mining, copper producing corporation
- Anvil Knitwear, century-old brand acquired by Gildan Activewear

== Media and entertainment ==
- North Carolina Anvil, alternative weekly newspaper
- The Anvil, American political magazine of the 1930s
- Anvil the Rhino, Ace Lightning character
- Anvil (game engine), video game engine
- "Anvil" (The Prisoner), a 2009 television episode

== Medicine ==
- Anvil (insecticide), used against mosquitoes carrying West Nile Virus
- Anvil (pesticide), used against fleas and ticks

== Music ==
- The Anvil (album), by British pop band Visage (1982), includes the eponymous song
- Anvil (band), heavy metal band
  - Anvil! The Story of Anvil, documentary about the band (2008)

== Persons ==
- Jim "The Anvil" Neidhart (1955-2018), wrestler
- Christopher Anvil (1925–2009), pseudonym of writer Harry C. Crosby

== Places ==
- Anvil City, former name of Nome, Alaska
- Anvil, Michigan, unincorporated community, United States
- Anvil, Ohio, unincorporated community, United States
- Anvil Island, British Columbia, Canada
- The Anvil, Basingstoke, theatre and concert hall in Basingstoke, England
- The Anvil (gay club) (1974–86), in New York City

== Other ==
- ANVIL, term for CAD software encompassing ANVIL EXPRESS, ANVIL-5000 and ANVIL-1000MD
- Anvil cloud or anvil dome, part of many cumulonimbus clouds
- Anvil, part of the military tactic hammer and anvil
- Part of a stapler
- El Yunque (organization) (Spanish for The Anvil), Mexican secret society
- Anvil, a Python platform for developing web applications
- Anvil, an American-made UCAV (unmanned combat aerial vehicle)
- The Anvil sex position where woman sets her legs on the males shoulders while he penatrates

== See also ==
- Operation Anvil (disambiguation)
- Anwil, municipality in Sissach, Switzerland
- Anavil
