= British Bruisers =

Professional wrestling tag team

Tag team
- Members: Dynamite Kid; Johnny Smith
- Name(s): British Bruisers; The New British Bulldogs; The British Bulldogs
- Billed heights: 1.73 m (5 ft 8 in)-Dynamite; 1.80 m (5 ft 11 in)-Smith
- Combined billed weight: 214 kg (472 lb)
- Billed from: England
- Debut: May 5, 1989
- Disbanded: December 6, 1991 (full-time); July 29, 1993 (last match)

The British Bruisers were a professional wrestling tag team who competed in Stampede Wrestling and All Japan Pro Wrestling. The team consisted of The Dynamite Kid and Johnny Smith. The Bruisers were created by Stampede Wrestling as part of a promotional angle in which Kid turned heel on longtime tag partner Davey Boy Smith.

== History ==
Dynamite Kid and Johnny Smith formed The British Bruisers in Stampede Wrestling in May 1989, after the breakup of The British Bulldogs, feuding with Davey Boy Smith, until the promotion's closure in December 1989. In September 1990, Davey Boy Smith pulled out of the yearly World's Strongest Tag Determination League to return to the World Wrestling Federation. For the upcoming tag league, The British Bruisers reunited, for the 1990 WSTL, and they would ultimately finish in 9th place with 6 points.

For the rest of 1990 and all of 1991, The Bruisers continued to team in All Japan. For the most part, the Bruisers were used in the midcard and never made challenges for the World Tag Team Championship. On April 6, 1991, the team won their only title when they defeated Kenta Kobashi and Tsuyoshi Kikuchi to win the vacated All Asia Tag Team Championship. The Bruisers would hold the titles for 2 weeks before they lost the titles to Doug Furnas and Dan Kroffat on April 20, 1991. During their title reign both Dynamite and Smith took part in the 1991 Champion Carnival with Dynamite finishing 3rd in his block while Smith finished 6th in his block.

After losing the titles, the Bruisers would continue to remain in the midcard as they would never win another title and were left off several Budokan shows. In late 1991, Dynamite's body began to fall apart to years of injuries and steroid use. The Bruisers wrestled their last tour for All Japan by competing in the 1991 World's Strongest Tag Determination League. The team would finish in 10th place with 6 points. On December 6, 1991, Dynamite Kid wrestled his retirement match teaming with Smith to defeat Johnny Ace and Sonny Beach.

== Aftermath ==
Dynamite's retirement wouldn't last. A year and a half later on July 29, 1993, the Bruisers teamed one last time as they lost to Tsuyoshi Kikuchi and Jun Akiyama. Dynamite would continue to wrestle in his native England between January and April 1994. He would wrestle one more time in Japan on October 10, 1996, for Michinoku Pro Wrestling in a six-man tag team match teaming with Kuniaki Kobayashi and Dos Caras to defeat Tiger Mask, The Great Sasuke, and Mil Mascaras before needing to use a wheelchair.

Smith continued to wrestle in All Japan for another decade winning the All Asia Tag Team Championship a second time in 1998 with Wolf Hawkfield and winning the Unified World Tag Team Championship in 2001 with Taiyo Kea before eventually retiring after a much-publicized April 2003 hospitalization.

== Championships and accomplishments ==
- All Japan Pro Wrestling
  - All Asia Tag Team Championship (1 time)
  - World's Strongest Tag Determination League Fair Play Award (1990, 1991)
- Tokyo Sports
  - Special Achievement (1991) - Dynamite Kid
