= Serp i Molot =

Serp i Molot is Russian for hammer and sickle.

It may also refer to:

- FC Serp i Molot Moscow, a Russian football club
- Moscow Metallurgical Plant Serp i Molot

== See also ==
- Hammer and sickle (disambiguation)
