= Operation Anvil =

Operation Anvil may refer to:

- the original name for the Allied landing in southern France in August 1944, Operation Dragoon
- Operation Anvil (Mau Mau Uprising), the military control of Nairobi, Kenya, by British security forces from 24 April 1954, in an attempt to sever rebel supply lines during the Mau Mau Uprising
- Operation Anvil (Nuclear test), a series of 21 underground nuclear tests at the Nevada Test Site in 1981 and 1982
- Garda Síochána operation targeting organised crime and criminal gangs and associates
- Operation Anvil (Honduras)
- Operation Anvil, the US Navy counterpart of Operation Aphrodite, the US Army Air Forces use of war-weary heavy bombers converted to remote-controlled drones against fortified German targets in World War II.
