= Arm and hammer (disambiguation) =

Arm and hammer is a symbol of industry, and the god Vulcan.

Arm and hammer may also refer to:

- Arm & Hammer, brand of baking soda products
- Arm & Hammer Park, formerly Mercer County Waterfront Park, in Trenton, New Jersey, USA
- Armnhmr, electronic music duo that did a remix of "Closer" (The Chainsmokers song)

== See also ==
- Armand Hammer (disambiguation)
- Hammer and sickle (disambiguation)
