= Armand Hammer (disambiguation) =

Armand Hammer (1898–1990) was an American industrialist.

Armand Hammer may also refer to:

- Armie Hammer (Armand Douglas Hammer, born 1986), American actor, great-grandson of the industrialist
- Michael Armand Hammer (born 1955), American businessman, grandson of the industrialist
- Armand Hammer (music group), a New York hip hop group

== See also ==
- Arm and hammer (disambiguation)
