= Stampede Wrestling World Mid-Heavyweight Championship =

Professional wrestling championship

Stampede World Mid-Heavyweight Championship

Details
- Promotion: Stampede Wrestling
- Date established: June 1959
- Date retired: February 26, 1983
Statistics
- First champion(s): Johnny Demchuck
- Final champion(s): Dynamite Kid

The Stampede World Mid-Heavyweight Championship was a professional wrestling title, one of the lesser known secondary titles created for Stampede Wrestling in 1959, and was the focal point of the 1982-83 feud between the Dynamite Kid and the Great Gama. The title would be defended for roughly four years, although being recognized by the promotion until it was abandoned some time around October 1985, when Dynamite Kid (who was wrestling in the WWF at that point) was last recognized as still holding the title. There have been a total of six recognized champions who have had a combined 11 official reigns.

== Title history ==
Key
No.	The overall championship reign
Reign	The reign number for the specific wrestler listed.
Event	The event promoted by the respective promotion in which the title changed hands
N/A	The specific information is not known
—	Used for vacated reigns in order to not count it as an official reign
	Indicates that there was a period where the lineage is undocumented due to the lack of written documentation in that time period.

No.	Champion	Reign	Date	Days held	Location	Event	Notes	Ref(s)
1	Johnny Demchuck	1	June 1959	(Note: Demchuck's title reign is too uncertain to calculate.)	N/A	N/A	Billed as World Junior Heavyweight Champion.	
2	Dick Steinborn	1	1979	(Note: Steinborn's first title reign is too uncertain to calculate.)	N/A	N/A	Dick Steinborn is billed as champion on arrival.	
3	Bruce Hart	1	June 1979	(Note: The exact date that Bruce Hart won and lost the championship are uncertain, which means that his reign lasted between 32 and 91 days.)	Calgary, Alberta	House show		
4	Dynamite Kid	1	August 1979	(Note: Due to lack of records the length of this reign cannot be determined, it could have lasted anywhere from 1 day to 332 days.)	N/A	House show		
5	Dick Steinborn	2	June 28, 1980	(Note: The exact date that Steinborn lost the championship is uncertain, which means that his championship reign lasted between 3 and 32 days.)	N/A	House show		
6	Keith Hart	1	July 1980	(Note: Due to lack of records the length of this reign cannot be determined, it could have lasted anywhere from 1 day to 116 days.)	N/A	House show		
7	Bruce Hart	2	October 25, 1980	(Note: Due to lack of records the length of this reign cannot be determined, it could have lasted anywhere from 1 day to 269 days.)	N/A	House show		
8	Dynamite Kid	2	July 3, 1981	(Note: Due to lack of records the length of this reign cannot be determined, it could have lasted anywhere from 1 day to 371 days.)	N/A	House show		
9	Davey Boy Smith	1	July 9, 1982	126	Calgary, Alberta	House show		
10	Gama Singh	1	November 12, 1982	32	Calgary, Alberta	House show		
11	Dynamite Kid	3	December 14, 1982	68	Regina, Saskatchewan	House show		
12	Gama Singh	2	January 21, 1983	(Note: Due to lack of records the length of this reign cannot be determined, it could have lasted anywhere from 11 to 32 days.)	N/A	House show	Still champion as of February 1, 1983; may be held up after a match against Dynamite Kid on February 18, 1983 in Calgary, Alberta	
13	Gama Singh	3	February 22, 1983	4	Regina, Saskatchewan	House show		
14	Dynamite Kid	4	February 26, 1983	(Note: The exact date the title was abandoned is uncertain, which puts the title reign at between 948 and 978 days.)	N/A	House show		
—	Abandoned	—	October 1985	—	N/A	N/A	Title is still recognized as of October 1985 but is not mentioned again thereafter.	
