= British Commonwealth Mid-Heavyweight Championship =

Professional wrestling championship

Details
- Promotion: Stampede Wrestling
- Date established: 1978; 1999
- Date retired: 1989; 2008
Statistics
- First champion(s): The Dynamite Kid
- Final champion(s): Gama Singh, Jr.
- Most reigns: Bruce Hart (8)
- Longest reign: Duke Durango (483 days)
- Shortest reign: Tiger Kahn, Hubert Gallant, Gama Singh Jr., Keith Hart, Terry Sawyer, Dick Steinborn, Davey Boy Smith, and Dynamite Kid (<1 day)

The British Commonwealth Mid-Heavyweight Championship was a professional wrestling title for lighter wrestlers in the Canadian professional wrestling promotion Stampede Wrestling. It was created in 1978.

== Title history ==
Key
| No. | Overall reign number |
| Reign | Reign number for the specific champion |
| Days | Number of days held |

| No. | Champion | Championship change | | | Reign statistics | | Notes | Ref. |
| No. | Champion | Date | Event | Location | Reign | Days | Notes | Ref. |
|---|---|---|---|---|---|---|---|---|
British Commonwealth Mid-Heavyweight Championship (1978-1989)
| 1 | Dynamite Kid | June 1, 1978 | Stampede show | N/A | 1 | 9 | | |
| 2 | Norman Frederick Charles III | June 10, 1978 | Stampede show | Edmonton, Alberta | 1 | 28 | | |
| 3 | Fighting Hara | July 8, 1978 | Stampede show | Edmonton, Alberta | 1 | 5 | | |
| 4 | Norman Frederick Charles III | July 13, 1978 | Stampede show | Edmonton, Alberta | 2 | 93 | | |
| 5 | Bret Hart | October 14, 1978 | Stampede show | Edmonton, Alberta | 1 | 84 | | |
| 6 | Dynamite Kid | January 6, 1979 | Stampede show | Edmonton, Alberta | 2 | 146 | | |
| 7 | Bret Hart | June 1, 1979 | Stampede show | N/A | 2 | 36 | | |
| 8 | Dynamite Kid | July 7, 1979 | Stampede show | N/A | 3 | 84 | | |
| 9 | Terry Sawyer | September 29, 1979 | Stampede show | N/A | 1 | 13 | | |
| 10 | Bret Hart | October 12, 1979 | Stampede show | N/A | 3 | 7 | | |
| — | Vacated | October 19, 1979 | Stampede show | N/A | — | — | Bret Hart moved to heavyweight division. | |
| 11 | Dynamite Kid | March 24, 1980 | Stampede show | Red Deer, AB | 4 | 179 | Defeated Keith Hart in a tournament final. | |
| 12 | Bruce Hart | September 19, 1980 | Stampede show | N/A | 1 | 175 | | |
| 13 | Hubert Gallant | March 13, 1981 | Stampede show | Calgary, Alberta | 1 | 57 | | |
| 14 | Keith Hart | May 9, 1981 | Stampede show | N/A | 1 | 177 | | |
| 15 | Davey Boy Smith | November 2, 1981 | Stampede show | N/A | 1 | 4 | | |
| 16 | Gama Singh | November 6, 1981 | Stampede show | N/A | 1 | 67 | | |
| 17 | Bruce Hart | January 12, 1982 | Stampede show | N/A | 2 | 149 | | |
| 18 | Dick Steinborn | June 10, 1982 | Stampede show | N/A | 1 | 26 | | |
| 19 | Bruce Hart | July 6, 1982 | Stampede show | N/A | 3 | 129 | | |
| 20 | Danny Davis | November 12, 1982 | Stampede show | Calgary, Alberta | 1 | 98 | | |
| 21 | Bruce Hart | February 18, 1983 | Stampede show | Calgary, Alberta | 4 | 196 | | |
| 22 | The Cobra | September 2, 1983 | Stampede show | Calgary, Alberta | 1 | 77 | | |
| 23 | Sonny Two Rivers | November 18, 1983 | Stampede show | Calgary, Alberta | 1 | 105 | | |
| 24 | Ron Starr | March 2, 1984 | Stampede show | Calgary, Alberta | 1 | 176 | | |
| 25 | Bruce Hart | August 25, 1984 | Stampede show | Edmonton, Alberta | 5 | 468 | | |
| 26 | Gama Singh | December 6, 1985 | Stampede show | Calgary, Alberta | 2 | 14 | | |
| 27 | The Cobra | December 20, 1985 | Stampede show | Calgary, Alberta | 2 | 1 | | |
| 28 | Gama Singh | December 21, 1985 | Stampede show | Edmonton, Alberta | 3 | 119 | | |
| 29 | Bruce Hart | April 19, 1986 | Stampede show | Edmonton, Alberta | 6 | 69 | | |
| — | Vacated | June 27, 1986 | Stampede show | N/A | — | — | Bruce Hart was injured | |
| 30 | Gama Singh | August 1, 1986 | Stampede show | Calgary, Alberta | 4 | 7 | | |
| 31 | Johnny Smith | August 8, 1986 | Stampede show | Calgary, Alberta | 1 | 42 | | |
| 32 | Les Thornton | September 19, 1986 | Stampede show | Calgary, Alberta | 1 | 36 | | |
| 33 | Owen Hart | October 25, 1986 | Stampede show | Edmonton, Alberta | 1 | 286 | | |
| 34 | Gama Singh | August 7, 1987 | Stampede show | Calgary, Alberta | 5 | 224 | | |
| 35 | Chris Benoit | March 18, 1988 | Stampede show | Calgary, Alberta | 1 | 84 | | |
| 36 | Johnny Smith | June 10, 1988 | Stampede show | Calgary, Alberta | 2 | 7 | | |
| 37 | Chris Benoit | June 17, 1988 | Stampede show | Calgary, Alberta | 2 | 7 | | |
| 38 | Johnny Smith | June 24, 1988 | Stampede show | Calgary, Alberta | 3 | 203 | | |
| 39 | Chris Benoit | January 13, 1989 | Stampede show | Calgary, Alberta | 3 | 175 | | |
| 40 | Johnny Smith | July 7, 1989 | Stampede show | Dawson Creek, BC | 4 | 1 | | |
| 41 | Chris Benoit | July 8, 1989 | Stampede show | Grande Prairie, AB | 4 | 27 | | |
| 42 | Gama Singh | August 4, 1989 | Stampede show | Calgary, Alberta | 6 | 71 | | |
| 43 | Bruce Hart | October 14, 1989 | Stampede show | Lethbridge, AB | 7 | 41 | | |
| — | Deactivated | November 24, 1989 | Stampede show | N/A | — | — | Stampede closed | |
British Commonwealth Heavyweight Championship (1999-2008)
| 44 | Richard Pound | November 5, 1999 | Stampede show | Calgary, Alberta | 1 | 210 | Defeated Tiger Khan and Greg Pawluk in a three-way match for the reactive title. | |
| 45 | Tiger Mahatma Khan | June 2, 2000 | Stampede show | Calgary, Alberta | 1 | N/A | | |
| — | Vacated | August 30, 2000 | Stampede show | N/A | — | — | vacated due to lack of defenses | |
| 46 | Bruce Hart | November 15, 2002 | Stampede show | Calgary, Alberta | 8 | 217 | Defeated Kwik Kick and TJ Wilson in a three-way tournament final. | |
| 47 | Duke Durango | June 20, 2003 | Stampede show | Calgary, Alberta | 1 | 483 | | |
| 48 | TJ Wilson | October 15, 2004 | Stampede show | Calgary, Alberta | 1 | 91 | | |
| 49 | Duke Durango | January 14, 2005 | Stampede show | Calgary, Alberta | 2 | N/A | | |
| — | Vacated | May 20, 2005 | Stampede show | N/A | — | — | Championship vacated for undocumented reasons | |
| 50 | Pete Wilson | June 17, 2005 | Stampede show | Calgary, Alberta | 1 | 343 | Defeated Gama Singh, Jr. and Randy Myers. | |
| 51 | Randy Myers | May 26, 2006 | Stampede show | Calgary, Alberta | 1 | 231 | | |
| 52 | Chucky Blaze | January 12, 2007 | Stampede show | Calgary, Alberta | 1 | 336 | | |
| 53 | Gama Singh, Jr. | December 14, 2007 | Stampede show | Calgary, Alberta | 1 | 134 | | |
| — | Deactivated | April 26, 2008 | Stampede show | N/A | — | — | Stampede closed | |

== Combined reigns ==
| Rank | Wrestler | No. of reigns | Combined days |
|---|---|---|---|
| 1 | Bruce Hart | 8 | 1444 |
| 2 | Gama Singh | 6 | 502 |
| 3 | Duke Durango | 2 | 483 |
| 4 | Dynamite Kid | 4 | 418 |
| 5 | Pete Wilson | 1 | 343 |
| 6 | Chucky Blaze | 1 | 326 |
| 7 | Chris Benoit | 4 | 293 |
| 8 | Owen Hart | 1 | 286 |
| 9 | Johnny Smith | 4 | 253 |
| 10 | Randy Myers | 1 | 231 |
| 11 | Richard Pound | 1 | 210 |
| 12 | Keith Hart | 1 | 177 |
| 13 | Ron Starr | 1 | 176 |
| 14 | Gama Singh Jr. | 1 | 134 |
| 15 | Norman Frederick Charles III | 2 | 121 |
| 16 | Bret Hart | 3 | 120 |
| 17 | Sonny Two Rivers | 1 | 105 |
| 18 | Danny Davis | 1 | 98 |
| 19 | TJ Wilson | 1 | 91 |
| 20 | The Cobra | 2 | 78 |
| 21 | Hubert Gallant | 1 | 57 |
| 22 | Les Thornton | 1 | 36 |
| 23 | Tiger Mahatma Khan | 1 | 30 |
| 24 | Dick Steinborn | 1 | 26 |
| 25 | Terry Sawyer | 1 | 13 |
| 26 | Fighting Hara | 1 | 5 |
| 27 | Davey Boy Smith | 1 | 4 |
