= Johnny Smith (wrestler) =

British professional wrestler

Personal information
- Born: John Robert Hindley; 7 August 1965 (age 61) Warrington, Cheshire, England
- Spouse: Jane Hindley

Professional wrestling career
- Ring name(s): Dynamite Smith; Johnny Smith; John Savage; Junior Royal; The Manxman
- Billed height: 5 ft 11 in (180 cm)
- Billed weight: 248 lb (112 kg)
- Billed from: Warrington, Cheshire, England
- Trained by: Ted Betley
- Debut: January 1982
- Retired: 9 April 2003

John Robert Hindley (born 7 August 1965) is an English retired professional wrestler, better known by the ring name Johnny Smith. He is widely known for his appearances with All Japan Pro Wrestling (AJPW).

== Professional wrestling career ==
=== Joint Promotions (1982–1986) ===
Hindley was trained by his uncle Ted Betley, initially in Winwick, Warrington, and then Port Erin, Isle of Man. He made his debut in January 1982 at the age of 16 at Gloucester Leisure Centre, under the name Junior Royal. A year later, he changed his ring name to John Savage, while wrestling in Germany. In July 1985, he would wrestle under the name The Manxman. His last match for Joint Promotions was held on 31 March 1986, losing to veteran Barry Douglas. Soon after, he moved across the Atlantic to Canada with his wife Jane. Smith would continue to return seasonally to Germany and Austria for the Catch Wrestling Association's summer season of tournaments throughout his career.

=== Stampede Wrestling (1986–1990) ===
Joining Stampede Wrestling in June 1986, Hindley was billed as Davey Boy Smith's brother, Johnny Smith. Two months later, he defeated Gama Singh to win his first championship, the Stampede British Commonwealth Mid-Heavyweight Championship. He would hold onto the title for over a month, before losing the title to Les Thornton.

In 1987, he went on his first Japanese tour in New Japan Pro-Wrestling (NJPW).

Initially a babyface, he turned heel in March 1988 as he joined forces with Gama Singh's Karachi Vice stable and began disrespecting the Hart family, going so far as to berating Davey Boy's wife Diana and feuding with Owen Hart.

In the spring of 1988, he began a feud with Chris Benoit over the British Commonwealth Mid-Heavyweight title. In June 1988, he defeated Benoit to win his second British Commonwealth Mid-Heavyweight title, but lost it back to Benoit a week later. However, Smith rebounded another week later and defeated Benoit for his third British Commonwealth Mid-Heavyweight title. In July 1988, he began feuding with Biff Wellington, which also included a hair vs. hair match in September, which Smith lost, but attacked Wellington after the match and cut his hair instead. In January 1989, Smith's third reign as British Commonwealth Mid-Heavyweight champion came to an end as he lost the title to Chris Benoit in a death match.

In February 1989, he began feuding with Dynamite Kid after interfering during a British Bulldogs-Karachi Vice rematch, attacking him from behind and cutting his hair. The feud also included a series of chain matches, dubbed the Battle of Britain. In May, Dynamite had turned on Davey Boy Smith and Johnny began teaming with Dynamite as The British Bruisers, feuding with Davey Boy and Chris Benoit. In July 1989, he defeated Benoit to win his fourth and final British Commonwealth Mid-Heavyweight championship, but lost it back to Benoit a day later.

=== New Japan Pro-Wrestling (1987) ===
From June to August 1987, Smith wrestled in Japan for New Japan Pro-Wrestling as part of its "Summer Big Fight Series". During the tour, he primarily teamed with other foreign wrestlers, including Bad News Allen, Buzz Sawyer, and Crusher Bam Bam Bigelow. His opponents included Antonio Inoki, Keiji Muto, Masa Saito, and Seiji Sakaguchi.

=== All Japan Pro Wrestling (1989–2003) ===
In February 1989, he followed The Dynamite Kid to wrestle for All Japan Pro Wrestling (AJPW) and replaced Davey Boy Smith as Dynamite Kid's tag team partner in September 1990, reforming The British Bruisers.

In between tours in All Japan, Hindley would wrestle the independent circuit in the United States and Canada, as well as brief stints in Extreme Championship Wrestling. He would also wrestle in Europe for Catch Wrestling Association under the name Dynamite Smith.

On 10 April 2003, Hindley collapsed prior to his match at an All Japan Pro Wrestling show. Paramedics were called to the Hiroshima Arena and Hindley was rushed to a local hospital, having lost feeling in some parts of his body, but was in stable condition at a local Japanese hospital. It was reported that the day before on 9 April in Osaka, Hindley suffered a serious leg injury, similar to "Dr. Death" Steve Williams's torn hamstring a few years prior, back in the States for the WWF. That night, he teamed with Gigantes, defeating Kazushi Miyamoto and Satoshi Kojima in what ended up being the final match of his career.

Sometime after the incident, Hindley decided to retire after more than two decades in the ring. He was planning to make a comeback in March 2004 for IWA Japan, but chose to remain retired for health reasons.

== Personal life ==
Hindley is married to a woman named Jane.

Hindley became a police officer for the city of Calgary.

According to Dynamite Kid's autobiography, Pure Dynamite, Hindley had a modest personality, as he was one of the few foreign wrestlers that did not negotiate anything at all, letting Giant Baba pay him what he thought was fair. Hindley was also known to be very kind to his fans. One night, a Japanese fan had made a ring jacket for him and was so nice and generous that Johnny didn't have the heart to point out the mistake on it (the misspelling of his first name, which ended up being "Jhonny") to him and wore the jacket throughout his career.

== Championships and accomplishments ==
- All Japan Pro Wrestling
  - All Asia Tag Team Championship (2 times) – with Dynamite Kid (1 time) and Wolf Hawkfield (1 time)
  - World Tag Team Championship (1 time) – with Taiyō Kea
  - World's Strongest Tag Determination League Fair Play Award (1990, 1991) – with Dynamite Kid
- Canadian Rocky Mountain Wrestling
  - CRMW Heavyweight Championship (2 times)
- Canadian Wrestling Hall of Fame
  - Class of 2016
- Pro Wrestling Illustrated
  - PWI ranked him 116 of the 500 best singles wrestlers in the PWI 500 in 1997
- Stampede Wrestling
  - Stampede British Commonwealth Mid-Heavyweight Championship (4 times)

== See also ==
- British Bruisers
