= Dynamite Kid =

British professional wrestler (1958–2018)

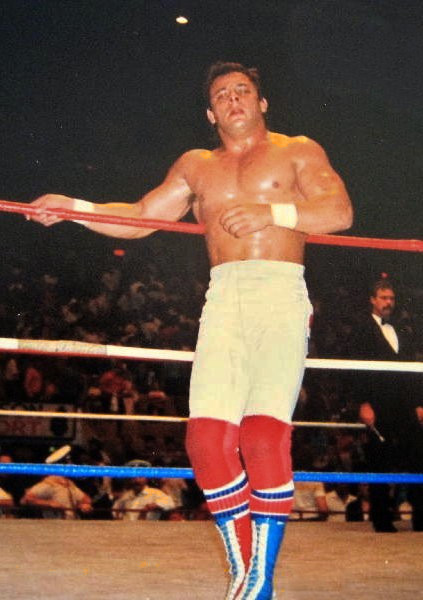
- Billington as part of The British Bulldogs

Personal information
- Born: Thomas Billington; 5 December 1958 Golborne, Lancashire, England
- Died: 5 December 2018 (aged 60) Ince, Wigan, Greater Manchester, England
- Spouses: Michelle Smadu (m. 1982; div. 1991) Dot Billington (m. 1997)
- Children: 3
- Relative: Davey Boy Smith (Cousin)
- Family: Billington; Hart (by marriage)

Professional wrestling career
- Ring name(s): Dynamite Kid; The Dynamite Kid
- Billed height: 5 ft 9 in (175 cm)
- Billed weight: 225 lb (102 kg)
- Billed from: Liverpool, England; Manchester, England
- Trained by: Ted Betley; Jack Fallon; Riley's Gym; John Foley; Stu Hart
- Debut: January 1975
- Retired: 10 October 1996

Thomas Billington (5 December 1958 – 5 December 2018), best known by the ring name the Dynamite Kid, was a British professional wrestler.

Trained by former wrestler "Dr Death" Ted Betley, he competed in the World Wrestling Federation (WWF), Stampede Wrestling, All Japan Pro Wrestling (AJPW), and New Japan Pro-Wrestling (NJPW). With his cousin Davey Boy Smith, he was also known for being one half of the tag team The British Bulldogs.

He had notable feuds with Tiger Mask in Japan and Bret Hart in Canada.

Billington is considered by many, including Bret Hart, to have been one of wrestling's most influential in-ring performers, having increased the level of athleticism involved in the art, bringing together styles from Britain, Mexico, Canada and Japan.

== Early life ==
Billington was born on 5 December 1958 in Golborne, Lancashire, near Manchester. He had two sisters and a younger brother named Mark. His father Bill and uncle Eric Billington were boxers in their youth and his grandfather Thomas Billington was a bare-knuckle boxer. He was a member of the Billington family. One of his ancestors James Billington was a wrestler who in 1891 became chief executioner of Great Britain and Ireland.

Academic work was not a priority to him, but he was drawn to sports at his comprehensive school; his adherence to it, particularly wrestling and gymnastics, helped him develop a relatively small but powerful and agile shape. In addition, he had also received training in boxing during his formative years, which helped instill toughness in him before his career.

== Professional wrestling career ==
=== Early career (1975–1984) ===
Billington was trained by former wrestler "Dr Death" Ted Betley after a meeting at his father’s workplace introduced the two. He trained with Betley for three years starting at 13, and attended Riley's Gym, known as The Snake Pit, where he learned freestyle wrestling. Dynamite Kid made his debut working in 1975 for Max Crabtree. Billington’s first match filmed for TV was taped 30 June 1976 in Lincoln (and transmitted 30 October by which time another match against Pete Meredith had been filmed and screened) saw him lose by technical knockout to veteran heel "Strongman" Alan Dennison after injuring his throat on the top ring rope. However, Dennison was so impressed by the technical skill of his young opponent that he refused the win and consequently changed his ways and became a blue-eye and a friend of Billington and subsequently Smith (in kayfabe), replacing Betley as Smith's trainer following Betley's (real life) retirement.

During his early days, he won the British Lightweight title on 23 April 1977, and the Welterweight title on 25 January 1978. He subsequently won the European Welterweight Championship defeating French wrestler Jean Corne in a match screened on ITV as part of the 1978 FA Cup Final coverage. He was also instrumental in starting the career of then-Judo star Chris Adams while still competing in the UK, was scouted and moved to Calgary, Alberta, Canada in 1978. He would make occasional home visits over the next few years, including challenging World Heavyweight Middleweight Champion Rollerball Rocco in a televised title match ending in a double knockout.

Billington made a big impact in his matches for Stampede Wrestling with the increasingly popular Bruce Hart and rookie Bret Hart. Despite differences between them due to comments made about Stu Hart in his autobiography, Bret still regards him as "pound-for-pound, the greatest wrestler who ever lived." Billington began taking steroids in 1979, when Big Daddy Ritter, aka the Junkyard Dog, introduced Billington to the anabolic steroid Dianabol. Billington was also introduced to speed during his stay in Canada by Jake Roberts.

After doing big business in Canada, Billington was booked on his first tour of Japan, working for International Wrestling Enterprise from 19 to 25 July 1979. Stu Hart and Stampede Wrestling switched their business relationship from IWE to New Japan Pro-Wrestling shortly after Billington's first tour, and he wrestled for New Japan from 4 January 1980 to 2 August 1984. Perhaps the most memorable matches that came out of Billington’s run in New Japan were from his now legendary feud against Tiger Mask; Tiger Mask's debut was against Dynamite, in which Tiger Mask shocked the wrestling world by gaining the victory over Billington. The two would compete against one another several more times in a feud that is often credited as putting Junior Heavyweight wrestling on the map, as well as setting the standard for future generations. Both the NWA and WWF Junior Heavyweight titles were vacated after Tiger Mask was injured by Billington in a tag match on 1 April 1983. Dynamite and Kuniaki Kobayashi competed for the vacant titles, but no winner was decided. On 21 April 1983, Billington and Tiger Mask met for the vacant WWF Junior Heavyweight Championship, but no winner was decided after the match ended up as a draw three consecutive times.

In 1983, Billington made his debut to the United States working for Pacific Northwest Wrestling where he feuded with Curt Hennig. Eventually he won the NWA Pacific Northwest Heavyweight title from Hennig on 7 September. A month later he dropped the title from Billy Jack Haynes. Then in November he teamed up with The Assassin and won the Pacific Northwest Tag titles from Curt Hennig and Buddy Rose. A month later they dropped the belts to Hennig and Scott McGhee.

On 7 February 1984, Billington captured the WWF Junior Heavyweight Championship by winning a tournament in New Japan Pro-Wrestling; although it was a WWF Title, it was primarily defended in Japan. He defeated Davey Boy Smith earlier in the tournament and would go on to defeat The Cobra in the finals.

=== World Wrestling Federation (1984–1988) ===
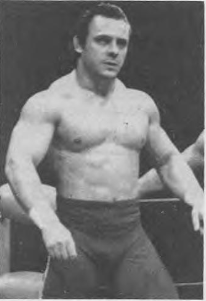
Billington, c. 1987

Billington made his WWF television debut on 29 August 1984, where he and Bret Hart defeated Iron Mike Sharpe and Troy Alexander in a match eventually shown on 15 September 1984, on the Maple Leaf Garden broadcast. In 1985, Billington would end up teaming with Davey Boy Smith as the British Bulldogs, while Bret would turn heel and team with Jim Neidhart as The Hart Foundation, and it led to matches between the two teams that usually ended in No-Contests. On 7 April 1986, accompanied by Captain Lou Albano and Ozzy Osbourne, the British Bulldogs won the WWF World tag team title from Greg Valentine and Brutus Beefcake at WrestleMania II.

Billington would suffer a serious injury in a tag-team match that took place in December 1986 in Hamilton, Ontario, Canada, against Don Muraco and Bob Orton, Jr. and several wrestlers including Roddy Piper, Junkyard Dog and Billy Jack Haynes would substitute for him when tag title defences were made. While recovering in the hospital from back surgery, Billington would later recount that Bret Hart showed up and stated that Vince McMahon had sent him to get his tag belt; Billington refused. Shortly after checking himself out of the hospital (against doctors' orders), Billington met with McMahon, who requested that the Bulldogs drop the tag titles to the team of The Iron Sheik and Nikolai Volkoff; Billington refused, saying that he would only drop the belts to The Hart Foundation.

McMahon acquiesced and at a TV taping on 26 January 1987, The British Bulldogs wrestled a match to drop the titles to The Hart Foundation; the match would air on 7 February edition of WWF Superstars of Wrestling. The match itself was an odd sight, as Billington could barely walk due to back surgery. Billington was knocked out by Jimmy Hart's megaphone early in the match, avoiding him having to wrestle much in the match for story purposes. From that point forward, the Bulldogs would not be a top-tier team anymore, and while they would not become straight jobbers, they would mostly wrestle to double disqualifications, double countouts or time-limit draws against the top teams in the WWF.

Billington was known for being a tough guy and for his stiffness as a worker. Mick Foley reported that, when he and Les Thornton (another British wrestler) wrestled the Bulldogs in a tag-team match early in Foley's career, Billington manhandled him so badly in the ring that he tore a ligament in Foley's jaw with his signature Hook Clothesline, preventing Foley from eating solid food until his recovery. Outside of the ring, WWF-champion Randy Savage once specifically asked for him to watch his back when he went drinking in a hotel bar frequented by NWA wrestlers, including Ric Flair. He was also involved in heated backstage fights with Jacques Rougeau, one of which led to Rougeau hitting him with a fistful of quarters as he opened a door holding a cup of coffee, knocking several of his teeth out. Billington claimed the Rougeau incident was not the final straw that drove him to leave the WWF, but rather a dispute with WWF management over the issuance of complimentary plane tickets, over which he resigned from the company on principle and which to his surprise in retrospect, Smith followed suit.

The Bulldogs wrestled their last WWF match at the 1988 Survivor Series. Although their team would win the match after team captains The Powers of Pain (The Barbarian and The Warlord) eliminated the last remaining opponents The Conquistadores, the Bulldogs had earlier been eliminated when Billington had been pinned by Smash of the tag team champions Demolition.

=== Return to Stampede Wrestling, England and Japan (1988–1996) ===
After leaving the WWF, the Bulldogs returned to Stampede Wrestling to win the International Tag Team Titles. The Bulldogs also competed frequently in All-Japan Pro Wrestling where they were paid $20,000 each by Giant Baba, along with the liberty of choosing which tours they wanted to participate in. Upon returning to Stampede, the Bulldogs were involved in a feud with Karachi Vice over the Stampede International Tag Team Championship. However, by February 1989, Dynamite became involved in a brutal feud with Johnny Smith after Johnny interfered and attacked the Dynamite Kid, before cutting his hair. In May 1989, the Bulldogs split up in Stampede, but remained a team in AJPW. Over in Stampede, the Bulldogs feuded with each other, with Dynamite forming The British Bruisers with Johnny Smith and Davey Boy Smith teaming with a young Chris Benoit.

In 1990, Davey Boy Smith abruptly withdrew the Bulldogs from AJPW's annual World's Strongest Tag Determination League by returning to the WWF, and fabricating a story to the All-Japan office that Billington was in a serious car accident and was unable to compete. Back home in the UK, from 1991 onward, he would regularly appear for local promotions All Star Wrestling and Orig Williams' BWF where, due to his WWF success, he was a headline attraction this time around. Since Davey Boy Smith had trademarked the term "The British Bulldog" during the Bulldogs' previous run in WWF, he decided to return to the WWF as The British Bulldog and would send people to the United Kingdom to warn the promoter every time a flyer was distributed promoting Dynamite Kid as a "British Bulldog".

Johnny Smith would end up taking Davey Boy Smith's spot in the World's Strongest Tag Determination League, and the duo (known as the British Bruisers) continued to compete in All Japan Pro Wrestling. The duo managed to capture the All Asia Tag Team Championship, but the partnership was short-lived; the years of steroid abuse (including an incident in which he used horse steroids), working a high impact style, and cocaine usage caught up with Billington as he suddenly announced his retirement on 6 December 1991, immediately after the Bruisers defeated Johnny Ace and Sunny Beach at Nippon Budokan in Tokyo. He returned to Japan as a special guest with Lord James Blears on 28 February 1993 and claimed that he was going to send his 17-year-old brother to All Japan's Dojo, but it was not realised. He returned again for a tag team match with Johnny Smith on 28 July 1993 and was planning to promote an All-Japan show in his country in 1994, but it was not realised either.

In January 1994, he returned to England and worked again for All Star Wrestling.

Before embarking on another All-Japan tour, he visited Dan Spivey and stayed in his home in Florida for a week, while Spivey went on holiday. When Spivey came back, he and Billington allegedly took hits of LSD, which reportedly resulted in Billington coming close to death twice in one day, but he was revived with adrenaline shots by paramedics both times.

His final wrestling match took place on 10 October 1996, at a Michinoku Pro event called These Days. The match was promoted as a "Legends of High-Flying" six-man tag featuring Dynamite paired with Dos Caras and Kuniaki Kobayashi against the Great Sasuke, Mil Máscaras, and Tiger Mask. Dynamite's body had degenerated to the point where he was "practically skin and bones", as the bottom portion of his tights were very loose. In the end, Dynamite delivered his trademark tombstone piledriver on Great Sasuke, leading Dos Caras to powerbomb Sasuke for the pin. While at the airport to return home on the next day, Dynamite had a second seizure (the first one was in 1987) and was sent to the hospital immediately.

== Personal life ==
In 1991, he was divorced from his first wife Michelle Smadu (the sister of Bret Hart's then-wife Julie), with whom Billington had one son and two daughters (Marek, Bronwyne and Amaris). Following the end of his marriage to Michelle, he moved from Canada back home to Golborne with his parents. There he married for a second time to a woman named Dot; with her he had three stepsons; John, Steven and Mark. Dot died on 9 July 2024. Before his death Billington had two granddaughters, Miami and Taya. He is now survived by three more grandchildren: Madix, Harlow and Miko.

Billington was a close friend of Wayne Hart. When Billington was living in Calgary, they co-owned an apartment together where they lived with their respective girlfriends.

=== Altercations with other wrestlers ===
Billington had several violent interactions with fellow wrestlers. One such event was with Bruce Hart, in which Billington broke Hart's jaw. Another was while in WWF, where wrestler Jacques Rougeau Jr. felt that Billington had bullied him and sucker punched Billington in the face with a fist holding rolled up quarters, knocking out Billington's front teeth, which required 45 stitches and resulted in a severe concussion.

=== Health problems ===
In 1997, after having a great deal of complications he was experiencing with walking due to the large number of back and leg injuries he sustained during his career, Billington lost the use of his left leg. Using a wheelchair for mobility, he was cared for by his second wife, Dot. Billington was told he would never be able to walk again. Harley Race, the inventor of the diving headbutt (a move Chris Benoit also used frequently), stated that he regretted ever inventing the move due to its ostensible causation of spinal problems, concussions, and that it may have contributed to Billington's disability. In addition to his paralysis, Billington also had heart problems. In November 2013, Billington reportedly had a stroke.

In 2015, he was named in a lawsuit filed by WWE after the organisation received a letter from him indicating that he intended to sue them for concussion-based injuries sustained during his affiliation with WWE. He was represented by attorney Konstantine Kyros, who is involved in several other lawsuits involving former WWE wrestlers. Billington's lawsuit was dismissed by US District Judge Vanessa Lynne Bryant in September 2018.

=== Death ===
Billington died on 5 December 2018, his 60th birthday. The exact cause of death remains unconfirmed, but the BBC report of his death placed it in the context of the above-mentioned health issues. At the time of his death Billington’s siblings stated that his health issues resulted in him being depressed, was in a long term care facility and that he took numerous medications for his health conditions.

== Legacy ==
Billington's British training, combined with an aerial arsenal honed during numerous tours in Japan, influenced a generation of later wrestling stars, especially those normally associated with Stu Hart's "Dungeon". A follower was Chris Benoit, who idolised Billington while growing up and adopted a similar moveset that included the swandive headbutt and the Snap suplex.

In February 2013, Highspots.com released a documentary named Dynamite Kid: A Matter of Pride on the Dynamite Kid.

In October 2014, Billington was presented with a lifetime achievement award at Gloucester Leisure Centre by Superstars of Wrestling UK.

Billington is featured in the 2016 documentary Nine Legends.

The playable character "Dynamite Tommy" in the Mat Mania/Mania Challenge/Exciting Hour arcade games of the mid-1980s is often presumed to be modeled after Billington. The artwork for the game features the character wearing a championship belt which is quite similar to the WWF Junior Heavyweight Championship which Billington held.

Billington's nephews Thomas and Mark have become professional wrestlers, having been trained by Marty Jones and have formed a tag team, The Billington Bulldogs.

On 16 September 2021, Vice TV aired (as part of their series Dark Side of the Ring) a retrospective of Billington's life, both in and out of the ring. Included in that program are interviews with Dynamite's former wife, daughters, and wrestlers Dan Spivey and WWE Hall of Famer Mick Foley.

== Championships and accomplishments ==
- All Japan Pro Wrestling
  - All Asia Tag Team Championship (1 time) – with Johnny Smith
  - NWA International Junior Heavyweight Championship (1 time)
  - World's Strongest Tag Determination League Fighting Spirit Award (1984, 1985) – with Davey Boy Smith
  - World's Strongest Tag Determination League Skills Award (1989) – with Davey Boy Smith
  - World's Strongest Tag Determination League Fair Play Award (1990, 1991) – with Johnny Smith
- Atlantic Grand Prix Wrestling
  - AGPW International Heavyweight Championship (1 time)
- Canadian Wrestling Hall of Fame
  - Class of 2001
- Joint Promotions
  - British Welterweight Championship (1 time)
  - British Lightweight Championship (1 time)
  - European Welterweight Championship (1 time)
- New Japan Pro-Wrestling
  - WWF Junior Heavyweight Championship (1 time)
  - WWF Junior Heavyweight Title League (1984)
  - Greatest Gaijin Junior Section (2002)
- Pacific Northwest Wrestling
  - NWA Pacific Northwest Heavyweight Championship (1 time)
  - NWA Pacific Northwest Tag Team Championship (1 time) – with The Assassin
- Pro Wrestling Illustrated
  - Ranked # 5 of the 100 best tag teams of the "PWI Years" with Davey Boy Smith in 2003.
  - Ranked #41 of the top 500 singles wrestlers of the "PWI Years" in 2003
- Stampede Wrestling
  - Stampede British Commonwealth Mid-Heavyweight Championship (4 times, inaugural)
  - Stampede International Tag Team Championship (6 times) – with Sekigawa (1), Loch Ness Monster (1), Kasavudo (1), Duke Myers (1), Davey Boy Smith (2)
  - Stampede North American Heavyweight Championship (1 time)
  - Stampede World Mid-Heavyweight Championship (4 time, final)
  - Stampede Wrestling Hall of Fame (Class of 1995)
- Tokyo Sports
  - Lifetime Achievement Award (1991)
- World Wrestling Federation
  - WWF Tag Team Championship (1 time) – with Davey Boy Smith
- Wrestling Observer Newsletter
  - Best Flying Wrestler (1984)
  - Best Technical Wrestler (1984) - tied with Masa Saito
  - Best Wrestling Maneuver (1984) Power clean dropkick
  - Hardest Worker (1983)
  - Match of the Year (1982) vs. Tiger Mask on 5 August, Tokyo, Japan
  - Most Underrated (1983)
  - Most Impressive Wrestler (1983-1985)
  - Tag Team of The Year (1985) - with Davey Boy Smith
  - Wrestling Observer Newsletter Hall of Fame (Class of 1996)

=== Luchas de Apuestas record ===
Winner (wager)	Loser (wager)	Location	Event	Date	Notes
Bruce Hart (hair)	Dynamite Kid (hair)	Calgary, Alberta	Stampede	1980s (Note: No later than 1984)	(Note: The loss resulted in Dynamite Kid's manager JR Foley having his head shaved since Dynamite's hair was already cut so short.)
