= Anvil, Ohio =

- Unincorporated community
- Location within Ohio Location within the United States
- Coordinates: 39°59′29″N 80°50′04″W
- Country: United States
- State: Ohio
- County: Belmont
- Elevation: 1,312 ft (400 m)
- Time zone: UTC-5 (Eastern (EST))
  - Summer (DST): UTC-4 (EDT)
- Area code: 740
- GNIS feature ID: 1050273

Anvil is an unincorporated community in Belmont County, Ohio, United States.
