= Operation Anvil (Honduras) =

2012, Honduran-U.S. joint anti-drug trafficking operation

- Operation Name: Operation Anvil
- Type: Drug Trafficking Enforcement
- Scope: multinational

Roster
- Executed by: U.S. Drug Enforcement Administration (DEA), National Police of Honduras
- Countries Participated: United States, Honduras
- # of Countries Participated: 2+

Mission
- Objective: Interrupting drug trafficking from South America to Honduras.

Timeline
- Date begin: April 2012
- Duration: 90 days

Results

Accounting

Operation Anvil was a ninety-day pilot program conducted by the members of United States Drug Enforcement Administration (DEA)'s Foreign-deployed Advisory and Support Team (FAST) and officers from the Honduran National Police's Tactical Response Team (TRT) against drug trafficking from South America to Honduras." which began in April 2012. During the operation in 2012 there were "three deadly force incidents, on 11 May 2012, 23 June and 3 July. On 11 May DEA agents and Honduran police "killed and injured innocent civilians during the operation and ... abused residents in a nearby village." News of the incident was widely publicized. This led to a joint review by the U.S. Department of State (DOS), the U.S. Office of the Inspector General (OIG) and the U.S. Department of Justice (DOJ) of drug interdiction missions. Their 424-page report on Operation Anvil was published in May 2017.

== Agencies and roles ==
The FAST team trained, advised, and assisted TRT officers on the three missions. "State Department-owned helicopters provided transport and armed air support on the missions. The Honduran Air Force provided door gunners and, on certain missions, U.S. Customs and Border Protection (CBP) aircraft provided detection and surveillance capabilities. In addition, State’s Bureau of International Narcotics and Law Enforcement Affairs (INL) provided operational support from the command center in Honduras."

== 11 May 2012 incident ==
In Ahuas, Honduras a passenger boat with more than twelve people aboard came in contact with the small Operation Anvil three-man team transporting "large amounts of cocaine" that they had seized earlier in the evening. Following rounds of gunshot, embassy officials began to receive "reports from Ahuas that innocent civilians had been killed and injured and that there had been abusive police activity in a nearby village".

== Joint OIG-DOJ-DOS report ==
On 24 May 2017, a "critical report" by the inspectors general for the Justice and State departments on the three incidents was released, saying "officers and agency officials misrepresented facts on their use of deadly force, follow up investigations were flawed and U.S. officials misled Congress about what happened". However, the report also concluded that there was no evidentiary basis to charge any of the agents, nor did any of the agents involved on the ground lie to or mislead investigators.
