= Bruce Hart (wrestler) =

Canadian professional wrestler (born 1950)

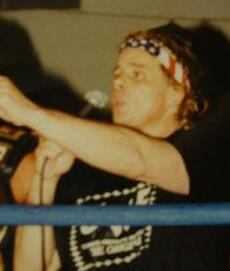
- Hart in 1997

Personal information
- Born: Bruce Edward Hart; January 13, 1950 (age 76) Great Falls, Montana, U.S.
- Spouse: Andrea Reding (m. 1987; div. 2004)
- Children: 5
- Family: Hart

Professional wrestling career
- Ring name: Bruce Hart
- Billed height: 5 ft 9 in (1.75 m)
- Billed weight: 212 lb (96 kg)
- Billed from: Calgary, Alberta, Canada
- Trained by: Stu Hart
- Debut: 1972
- Retired: 2012

Bruce Edward Hart (born January 13, 1950) is an American-born Canadian retired professional wrestler, promoter, booker, trainer and school teacher. He is a second-generation wrestler and a member of the Hart wrestling family, being the second child of Stu and Helen Hart. He is best known for his time in Stampede Wrestling and several appearances for WWE, often with his brothers Bret and Owen.

As a wrestler Hart carried a number of championships, including the Stampede North American Heavyweight Championship and participated in WWF's Survivor Series.

== Early life ==
While his mother was pregnant with Hart she and her husband Stu suffered an automobile accident. This resulted in his older brother Smith being cared for by their maternal grandparents for almost two years while Helen recovered in the hospital.

He is of Greek descent through his maternal grandmother and Irish through his maternal grandfather. His father was mainly of Scots-Irish descent but also had Scottish and English ancestry. Hart is a dual citizen of Canada and the United States.

== Professional wrestling career ==
=== Stampede Wrestling (1972–1990) ===
==== Headlining and injury (1972–1977) ====
Bruce Hart began his wrestling training in 1971, at the age of 21, in his father's training school "The Dungeon". Trained by Stu Hart, Bruce, like the rest of his family, was trained in and focused on a technically sound, amateur wrestling style.

He debuted in 1972, in his fathers Calgary promotion, Stampede Wrestling, tag teaming with Dan Kroffat in the main event, against North American Champion Kendo Nagasaki (the original masked British version) and his manager "Gorgeous" George Gillette (billed in Canada as "Lord Sloane of Kensington Gore".) For the next six months he remained a headline performer for the promotion, working against the likes of John Quinn, Benny Ramirez, Frank Butcher, Tor Kamata, Chatti Yokuchi and Yasu Fuji. In June 1973, he suffered a serious shoulder injury which sidelined him for 9 months and nearly finished his career. He returned in the summer of 1974, and continued as performer in Western Canada. Hart kept wrestling on and off but had relatively few matches until after 1977.

==== Time in England and Germany (1977–1978) ====
He traveled to the United Kingdom in 1977, where he wrestled under the name "Bronco" Bruce Hart for the London/Halifax based Joint Promotions.

While there, he met a young Tom Billington and offered him an opportunity to wrestle for Stampede, which Billington declined. After a falling out with Joint Promotions, Billington, using the ring name Dynamite Kid, traveled to Canada and joined Stampede. Dynamite quickly became a huge star in Western Canada. As a result, Hart invited Billington's younger cousin, David Smith, to also come to Western Canada. Smith, who originally wrestled as Young David, later became known as Davey Boy Smith (after British lightweight boxing champion - Dave Boy Green) after Hart decided that it was a better ring name.

In 1978 Hart and Billington worked together as a tag team in the German promotion Verband der Berufsringer, they wrestled against Angel Grey and Michael Seitz. Hart also worked in singles matches against Seitz.

While working in Germany, Hart observed the German system of yellow cards to signify formal warnings (as with "Public Warnings" in British wrestling and "Avertisements" in French wrestling) three of which resulted in a red card and disqualification. He would subsequently bring this system back to Stampede where it was also imposed.

==== Booking and work in Japan (1979–1984) ====
From 1979 until 1984, Hart was in large part in charge of matchmaking and talent development, selling out regularly and producing a myriad of successful wrestlers, including: Jake Roberts, the Junkyard Dog, Jim Neidhart, "Dr. D." Dave Shultz, Honky Tonk Man, Bad News Allen (aka Bad News Brown) and Bret "the Hitman" Hart, the period was one where the company was generally breaking even.

In 1979 Hart won his first championship, the Stampede World Mid-Heavyweight Title from Dick Steinborn. In 1980 Hart won two championships, the World Mid-Heavyweight Title for a second time and the Stampede British Commonwealth Mid-Heavyweight Title. By the end of 1982 Hart won the Stampede British Commonwealth Mid-Heavyweight Championship two times and then a third time by the beginning of 1983.

In 1983 Hart worked for New Japan Pro Wrestling in their NJPW Bloody Fight Series. There he worked in singles matches against wrestlers such as Kengo Kimura, Kantaro Hoshino, Ryuma Go, Kuniaki Kobayashi and in tag team matches with wrestlers such as Bad News Allen and Tony St. Clair against Akira Maeda and Kengo Kimura with the former and against Isamu Teranishi and Rusher Kimura with the later as well as participating in three man tag matches with Dick Murdoch and Tony St. Clair against Antonio Inoki, Osamu Kido and Seiji Sakaguchi. Hart later in the year returned to Stampede. In March 1984 while back in Stampede Hart became Stampede International Tag Team Champion together with Davey Boy Smith.

Hart returned to New Japan in early April 1984 for the NJPW Big Fight Series where he primarily wrestled in singles matches, several of which were with Norio Honaga but also against other wrestlers such as Nobuhiko Takada, Tatsutoshi Goto, Masanobu Kurisu, Makoto Arakawa, Fumihiro Niikura, Isamu Teranishi. He also took part in one known tag match, partnering with Hercules Ayala against Haruka Eigen and Kantaro Hoshino.

Near the end of 1984, Bruce's father, Stu, accepted an offer from WWF president, Vince McMahon, to sell the promotion for $1,000,000, plus 10% of all subsequent WWF gates in Western Canada to the WWF. As part of the deal, several Stampede superstars, including Bret Hart, Dynamite Kid, Davey Boy and Neidhart also joined the WWF. However, several months later, Bruce violated the terms of the agreement by assisting a rival promotion in the territory, leading McMahon to renege on the deal.

==== Promoting (1985–1990) ====
As a result, near the end of 1985, Stu Hart decided to re-open the promotion with Bruce running most of it. Initially, the promotion, which had been hurt by the loss of most of its well-known wrestlers, struggled to remain afloat. As a consequence, Bruce chose to feature a new, edgier and more hard core style of wrestling - featuring villains: the Karachi Vice (Makhan and Vokhan Singh and the Great Gama), the Viet Cong Express (Hiroshi Hase and Nubohiko Niikura) Jason the Terrible, the masked Zodiak (Barry Orton) and younger babyfaces, such as Owen Hart, Ben Bassarab, Chris Benoit, Jushin Thunder Liger and the tag team Bad Company (Bruce Hart and Brian Pillman). In short order, the promotion would survive for the next several years, drawing reasonable gates and turning out a number of performers who would go on to have decent careers in other companies after the promotion's collapse. Despite this, the promotion suffered backstage due to Bruce and his father Stu having grave disagreements about how to handle storylines. The promotion shut down in 1989 when Stu's promoter's license expired and they could not afford to pay for a new one.

During this period Hart won five titles, the Stampede British Commonwealth Mid-Heavyweight Championship for the fifth time, the Stampede British Commonwealth Mid-Heavyweight Championship for the sixth time, the Stampede International Tag Team Championship for the third time with Brian Pillman as Bad Company, the Stampede International Tag Team Championship for the fourth time, again with Brian Pillman and the Stampede British Commonwealth Mid-Heavyweight Championship for the seventh time.

=== World Wrestling Federation (1992–1994) ===
Hart has made several appearances with his brothers Bret and Owen in the World Wrestling Federation (WWF). Bruce made his first appearance on the August 16, 1992, episode of WWF Superstars, where he sided with Davey Boy Smith in the run-up to SummerSlam 92. Bruce made his first in-ring appearance at the 1993 Survivor Series pay-per-view, teaming with his brothers Bret, Owen and Keith to take on Shawn Michaels and his "Knights" (The Red Knight, The Blue Knight and The Black Knight). The Knights theme was used as the team was supposed to be led by Jerry "The King" Lawler, who was having legal troubles at the same time as his feud with Bret Hart and was replaced by Michaels. The Hart Brothers won the match, with Owen being the only team member eliminated.

Owen's failure ignited a lengthy feud between Bret and Owen that would last for several years. The Owen and Bret feud was originally conceived as a feud between Bret and Bruce but Bret proposed to make it between him and Owen instead as he believed the dynamic for them would be superior. At the 1994 SummerSlam, the two brothers competed in a Steel Cage match for the WWF Championship. Bruce and several Hart brothers interfered in the match by climbing the cage. Bruce also appeared on an episode of Monday Night Raw in the summer of 1994.

=== Ultimate Championship Wrestling (1996–1997) ===
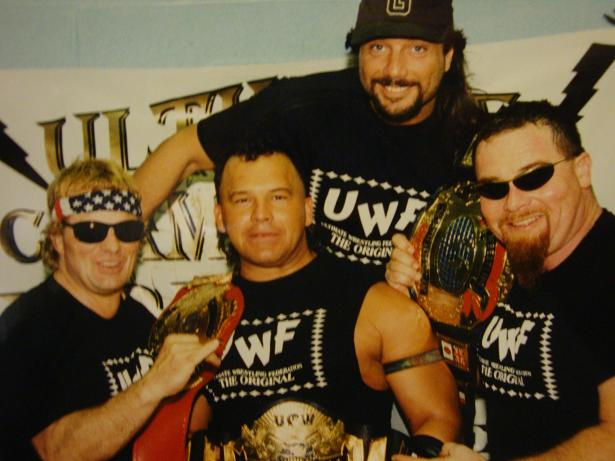
Bruce Hart, Jim Neidhart, Marty Jannetty, Chris Chavis (Tatanka) UCW 1997

In 1996 Bruce Hart made a comeback to the ring with the independent New York based promotion Ultimate Championship Wrestling (UCW), where he wrestled with the likes of Chris Chavis, his brother-in-law Jim "The Anvil" Neidhart, Falcon Coperis, and Marty Jannetty and feuding with wrestlers such as Tiger Khan.

In UCW Hart was involved in and developed an nWo type storyline in which he and former WWE wrestlers portrayed greedy lazy fat-cat type villains who looked down on and used the younger rookie talent at the shows to make money and gain power in the promotion.

Hart was instrumental in the development of the young talent of the UCW.

=== Return to World Wrestling Federation/Entertainment (1997, 2010) ===
Bruce's next WWF appearance was at In Your House 16: Canadian Stampede when he interfered in the main event which pitted The Hart Foundation (Bret Hart, Owen Hart, British Bulldog, Brian Pillman and Jim Neidhart) against Stone Cold Steve Austin, Ken Shamrock, Goldust and Legion of Doom (Hawk and Animal). Bruce played a key role in the finish of the match as he scuffled with Austin, allowing Owen to score the pinfall victory over Austin.

Bruce's next and most recent appearance in the renamed WWE was at WrestleMania XXVI, where he was the surprise Special Guest Referee for his brother Bret's first WWE match in 13 years, a No Holds Barred Lumberjack match against the WWE chairman Vince McMahon. McMahon thought that Bruce and the rest of Hart family were on his side, but they all turned on him and helped Bret win the match.

=== Promoting Stampede Wrestling (1999–2005) ===
Hart has attempted to revive Stampede Wrestling numerous times. In the late 90s Hart collaborated with his brother Ross Hart as promoters and bookers, this incarnation of Stampede Wrestling featured many third-generation members of the Hart family, including Natalya Neidhart, Teddy Hart and David Hart Smith.

In 2001 Hart won the Stampede North American Heavyweight Championship for the first time. In 2002 he won four titles, the Stampede International Tag Team Titles a fifth time with his nephew Teddy Hart, the Stampede British Commonwealth Mid-Heavyweight Championship for the eight and last time, the Stampede North American Heavyweight Championship as well as the Stampede International Tag Team Championships for the last time with TJ Wilson.

One of Hart's last matches for his and Ross's incarnation of Stampede Wrestling was in June 2003 in a match for the Stampede British Commonwealth Mid-Heavyweight Title against Duke Durrango which Hart lost, leaving over the title to Durrango.

=== Teaching and miscellaneous work (1990–present) ===
In 2011 Hart wrestled in a Four-On-Three-Handicap-Match for Stampede Next Generation Stampede Wrestling together with his nephew Teddy Hart and Hal Eagletail against Big Jess, DerRic Super Starlight, The Inuit Warrior and Wyatt Beaver.

In 2012 Hart wrestled his last match for Real Canadian Wrestlings 9th Anniversary Show in a Six-Man-Tag-Team-No-Disqualiication where he wrestled against Andrew Hawks, Kid Kash and nephew Teddy Hart together with Heavy Metal and Tommy Lee Curtis.

He was a trainer at the original Hart Brothers University wrestling school during the 1990s. In June 2013, Hart resurrected the wrestling school. He continues to train wrestlers at the school together with his sons Torrin and Bruce Jr. in his hometown of Calgary, AB. Some of the wrestlers he has trained include Chris Benoit, David Hart Smith, Natalya, Teddy Hart and Tyson Kidd.

Since 2014 Hart has a weekly column and runs a podcast for the multimedia website PWP Nation formerly co hosted by wrestler and journalist Jordan Garber and Jay Alletto.

== Other media ==
Hart has appeared on several wrestling documentaries, including the 2010 documentary Survival of the Hitman which is about his younger brother Bret Hart and the WWE released Hart and Soul: The Hart Family Anthology in which he has a segment dedicated to his career.

He was also present on the stage when his father Stu Hart was inducted into the WWE Hall of Fame.

== Personal life ==
In 2011 Hart published an autobiography entitled Straight from the Hart.

=== Family ===
He has five children with his ex-wife, Andrea Hart: daughters Brit and Lara and sons Torrin, Bruce Jr. and Rhettger Hart. Rhett was born three months premature and has cerebral palsy. Two of Bruce Hart's sons, Bruce Jr and Torrin, have been involved in pro wrestling.

Hart and his wife Andrea separated for a period from 2000 and Andrea started a relationship with Hart's former brother-in-law Davey Boy Smith until Smith's death in 2002. Andrea and Hart later reconciled but separated again after a time. Andrea died on December 27, 2019, at the age of 52.

== Championships and accomplishments ==
- Canadian Wrestling Hall of Fame
  - Class of 2001
- Polynesian Pacific Wrestling
  - NWA Polynesian Pacific Tag Team Title (1 time) – with Keith Hart
- Prairie Wrestling Alliance
  - Prairie Wrestling Alliance Hall of Fame (Class of 2010)
- Pro Wrestling Illustrated
  - Ranked No. 366 of the 500 best singles wrestlers in the PWI 500 in 1997
  - Ranked No. 481 of the 500 best singles wrestlers of the "PWI Years" in 2003
- Stampede Wrestling
  - NWA International Tag Team Championship (Calgary version) (2 times) – with Davey Boy Smith
  - Stampede British Commonwealth Mid-Heavyweight Championship (8 times)
  - Stampede International Tag Team Championship (2 times) – with Brian Pillman (2) and Teddy Hart (1) (Note: TJ Wilson replaced Teddy Hart after Hart suffered an injury.)
  - Stampede North American Heavyweight Championship (2 times)
  - Stampede World Mid-Heavyweight Championship (2 times)
  - Stampede Wrestling Hall of Fame (Class of 1995)

== Luchas de Apuestas record ==
Winner (wager)	Loser (wager)	Location	Event	Date	Notes
Bruce Hart (mask)	Ted Allen (mask)	Calgary, Alberta	Stampede Calgary	March 4, 1983	
Bruce Hart (hair)	Dynamite Kid (hair)	Calgary, Alberta	Stampede	1988	(Note: The loss resulted in Dynamite Kid's manager J.R. Foley having his head shaved since Dynamite's hair was already so short cut.)
