= Jim Neidhart =

American professional wrestler (1955–2018)

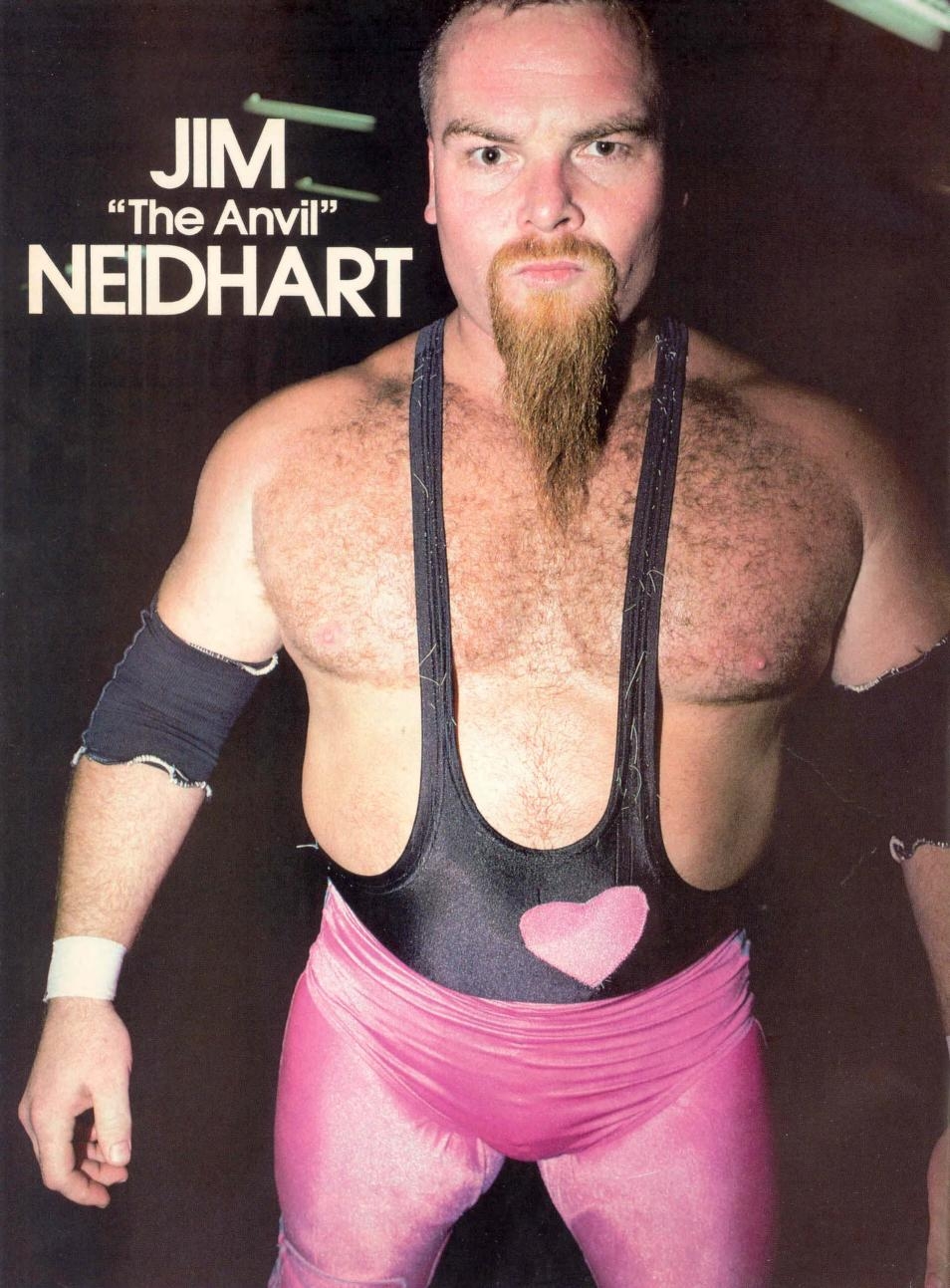
- Neidhart c. 1989

Personal information
- Born: James Henry Neidhart; February 8, 1955 Montebello, California, U.S.
- Died: August 13, 2018 (aged 63) Wesley Chapel, Florida, U.S.
- Cause of death: Head injury caused by a seizure resulting in a fall
- Spouses: Elizabeth "Ellie" Hart (m. 1979; div. 2001) (m. 2010)
- Children: 3, including Natalie
- Family: Hart

Professional wrestling career
- Ring name(s): Jim "The Anvil" Neidhart; Who
- Billed height: 6 ft 0 in (183 cm)
- Billed weight: 281 lb (127 kg)
- Billed from: Reno, Nevada "Who Knows Where" (as Who)
- Trained by: Stu Hart
- Debut: 1978
- Retired: 2016

James Henry Neidhart (February 8, 1955 – August 13, 2018) was an American professional wrestler known for his appearances in the 1980s and 1990s in the World Wrestling Federation as Jim "the Anvil" Neidhart, where he was a two-time WWF Tag Team Champion with his real-life brother-in-law Bret Hart in the Hart Foundation. He also won titles in Stampede Wrestling, Championship Wrestling from Florida, Mid-South Wrestling, Memphis Championship Wrestling and the Mid-Eastern Wrestling Federation. He was part of the Hart wrestling family through marriage to his wife Ellie Hart, teaming with various members throughout his career, and appearing with his daughter Natalya Neidhart on the reality television show Total Divas.

== Early life ==
At Newport Harbor High School, Neidhart first gained athletic acclaim for his success in strength-oriented track and field events. He set a California high school record in shot put in 1973 which stood until 1985. After graduating from high school, Neidhart pursued a career in the National Football League (NFL), where he played for the Oakland Raiders and Dallas Cowboys in practices and preseason games.

== Professional wrestling career ==
=== Early career (1978–1985) ===
Following his release from the Dallas Cowboys, Neidhart traveled to Calgary to train with Stu Hart and pursue a career in professional wrestling. He worked for Hart's Stampede Wrestling from 1978 to 1983, and again in 1985, during which time he married Ellie Hart, one of Stu's daughters. He was a two-time Stampede International Tag Team Champion, with Hercules Ayala in 1980 and Mr. Hito in 1983. Stu Hart, seeking publicity for Neidhart, promised him $500 to enter and win an anvil toss at the Calgary Stampede. He did, throwing it 11 feet, 2 inches. This earned him the nickname "The Anvil", replacing his prior nickname, "The Animal".

In September 1981, Neidhart appeared in Germany with the Catch Wrestling Association, taking part in the World Catch Cup. From April to May 1982, Neidhart wrestled in Japan for New Japan Pro-Wrestling (NJPW) on its Big Fight Series tour as part of Stampede Wrestling's working relationship with NJPW. In January 1983, he made a second tour with NJPW, competing in its New Year Golden Series.

Neidhart teamed twice with King Kong Bundy for Georgia Championship Wrestling in November 1983. From September 1983 to February 1984, he worked for Mid-South Wrestling, where he and Butch Reed held the Mid-South Tag Team Championship for two and a half months. In March 1984, he made a third tour of Japan with NJPW. From April to August 1984, Neidhart worked for the Continental Wrestling Association. In August 1984, he moved to Championship Wrestling from Florida, winning the NWA Southern Heavyweight Championship and NWA United States Tag Team Championship. In January 1985, he left Florida to join the World Wrestling Federation.

=== World Wrestling Federation (1985–1992) ===
==== Hart Foundation (1985–1991) ====
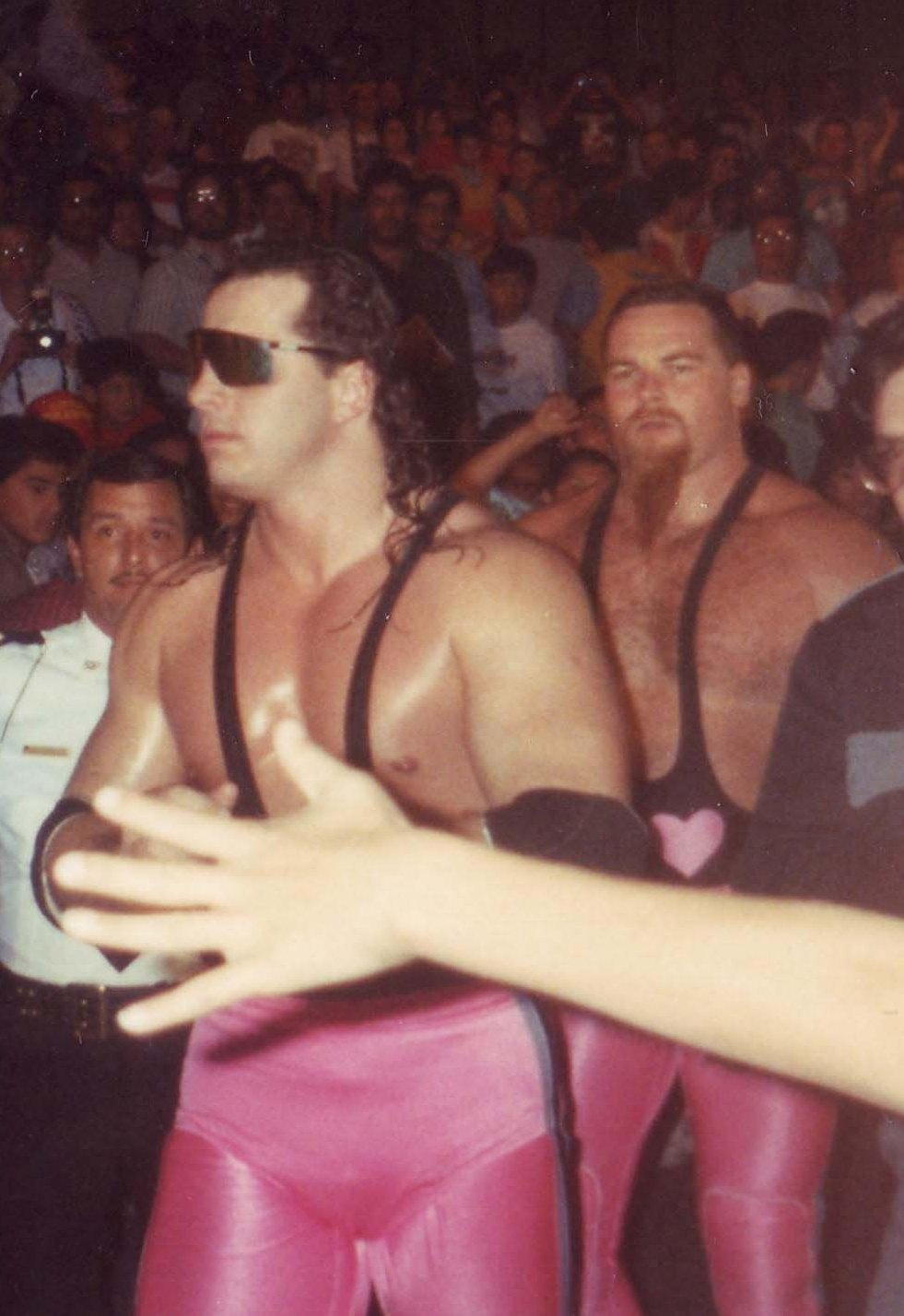
The "Hart Foundation" Neidhart (back) and Bret Hart (front), March 1989

When Stu Hart sold Stampede Wrestling to Vince McMahon, owner of the World Wrestling Federation (WWF), Neidhart and Bret Hart were included in the deal. Initially a singles wrestler, managed by Mr. Fuji, Neidhart debuted on January 21, 1985, in Madison Square Garden, defeating Tony Garea. He wrestled Hart, who had a cowboy gimmick, to a draw twice. Bret, upset with his gimmick, suggested to McMahon that he form a tag team with Neidhart. The new team was dubbed the Hart Foundation and was managed by Jimmy Hart (no relation to Bret). They made their pay-per-view debut at WrestleMania 2, where they were the last two eliminated from a 20-man battle royal by André the Giant.

The Hart Foundation won their first WWF World Tag Team Championship on the February 7, 1987, episode of WWF Superstars (taped January 26) from The British Bulldogs (Davey Boy Smith and The Dynamite Kid), with the help of referee Danny Davis, who was continually "distracted" by checking on Dynamite (laid out of the match early by a megaphone shot from Jimmy), allowing the challengers to double-team Smith. Davis was subsequently fired as referee and began wrestling, aligned with The Hart Foundation. They lost the titles on the November 7 episode of Prime Time Wrestling (taped October 27), to Strike Force (Rick Martel and Tito Santana).

The Hart Foundation wrestled in another 20-man battle royal at WrestleMania IV. Bad News Brown attacked and eliminated Hart to win. Neidhart eventually joined Bret's side in the feud with Brown causing a rift between the team and manager Jimmy Hart. This led them to fire him and before starting a feud with The Fabulous Rougeau Brothers. In the fall of 1988, Jimmy Hart began managing the Rougeaus. The Hart Foundation unsuccessfully challenged Demolition (Ax and Smash) for the tag title at the 1988 SummerSlam, when Ax hit Hart with Jimmy Hart's megaphone for the pin (Hart accompanied Demolition's manager, Mr. Fuji, solely to further his feud with the challengers). The Hart Foundation continued feuding with Jimmy Hart's wrestlers for the next year, teaming with Jim Duggan to defeat Dino Bravo and The Rougeaus in a 2/3 falls match at the 1989 Royal Rumble, then defeating The Honky Tonk Man and Greg Valentine at WrestleMania V. In April 1989, both Hart Foundation members began wrestling singles matches at house shows. Neidhart also had a few shots at Ravishing Rick Rude's Intercontinental Heavyweight Championship in August.

The Hart Foundation reformed full-time in March 1990 in Las Vegas. At WrestleMania VI in Toronto, they defeated The Bolsheviks (Nikolai Volkoff and Boris Zhukov) in 19 seconds. They started a second feud with champions Demolition, who at this point added Crush. At SummerSlam 90 on August 27, The Hart Foundation won the title for a second time in a 2/3 falls match. On October 30, 1990, The Rockers (Shawn Michaels and Marty Jannetty) defeated The Hart Foundation in a two out of three falls match in Fort Wayne, Indiana, to seemingly win the title. During the match, the top rope broke by accident, and the match did not air on television. The Rockers defended the WWF Tag Team title against Power and Glory (Paul Roma and Hercules) on November 3, 1990. Shortly after November 3, the WWF decided to not air the title change and that the title would revert to the Hart Foundation. In his book, Shawn Michaels claims that the Hart Foundation had politicked to keep the title. The WWF has never officially recognized The Rockers' reign. The Hart Foundation soon reignited their feud with Jimmy Hart via his team, Rhythm and Blues (Honky Tonk and Valentine). Jimmy Hart once again cost The Hart Foundation the tag titles at WrestleMania VII, in a match with his new team, The Nasty Boys (Brian Knobs and Jerry Sags), when he distracted the referee, allowing Sags to knock out Neidhart with his motorcycle helmet. Hart and Neidhart again split up, though they reunited for a title rematch with The Nasty Boys on the July 29 Prime Time Wrestling, losing by disqualification when Bret hit both champions with a helmet, again introduced by Jimmy Hart. Neidhart also commentated on Wrestling Challenge alongside Gorilla Monsoon and Bobby Heenan from March until August 1991.

==== New Foundation (1991–1992) ====
Neidhart returned to WWF television on the November 9, 1991 episode of Superstars of Wrestling, donning new parachute pants with checkerboard designs. He suffered a loss to Ric Flair, who continued to apply his figure-four leglock after winning the match. While hobbling away to the back, Neidhart was attacked and further injured by the Beverly Brothers. This resulted in him being replaced in the 1991 Survivor Series by Sgt. Slaughter.

Neidhart returned once more on the December 1, 1991 episode of Wrestling Challenge, teaming with Owen Hart (Bret's younger brother) as the New Foundation, defeating the Executioners (Executioner #1 and Executioner #2). The New Foundation's highlight was a win over the Orient Express (Kato and Tanaka) at the January 1992 Royal Rumble. The team also had matches with the Beverly Brothers, the Nasty Boys, the Natural Disasters, and the Powers of Pain throughout late-1991 and early-1992, but had little success overall. The New Foundation wrestled their final match on February 15, 1992; Neidhart was fired the next day after refusing to take a drug test and throwing a television monitor backstage.

=== Various promotions (1992–1994) ===
After leaving the WWF in February 1992, Neidhart wrestled a handful of matches on the independent circuit, including two bouts for Eastern Championship Wrestling (ECW). Beginning in August 1992, he made three tours with New Japan Pro-Wrestling: The G1 Climax in August (losing in the first round to Kensuke Sasaki), the Super Grade Tag League II in October (teaming with Tom Zenk and finishing with 0 points) and Battle Final in December.

In February and March 1993, Neidhart wrestled in Australia for the "Wrestling Down Under" promotion, working three matches with Jake Roberts.

In December 1993, Neidhart promoted several shows in Florida under the banner "Anvil Promotions".

Throughout early 1994, Neidhart wrestled for various independent promotions.

=== World Championship Wrestling (1993) ===
In April 1993, Neidhart began wrestling for World Championship Wrestling (WCW), making his debut on the May 15 episode of WCW Worldwide, beating a jobber, Todd Zane. After defeating Mustapha Saed on the next episode, Neidhart teamed with Junkyard Dog for the next, again beating Chick Donovan and Rip Rogers. Neidhart and The Junkyard Dog beat Paul Orndorff and Dick Slater by disqualification on the June 5 WCW Saturday Night. Eleven days later, he beat Shanghai Pierce in a dark match before Clash of the Champions XXIII. After losing to Maxx Payne at a house show in Kokomo, Indiana, on October 7, Neidhart left WCW.

=== Extreme Championship Wrestling (1993) ===
On November 13, 1993, Neidhart wrestled The Sandman to a no contest at ECW's November to Remember in the ECW Arena.

=== World Wrestling Federation (1994–1995) ===
Neidhart returned to the WWF at King of the Ring in June 1994 as Bret Hart's cornerman for his WWF Championship match defense against Intercontinental Champion Diesel. After Diesel hit Hart with his Jackknife finisher, Neidhart interfered to prevent the pin, and disqualifying Hart, but allowing him to retain the title. After the match, Diesel and Shawn Michaels beat down Hart, and Neidhart didn't intervene. Later that night, Neidhart reappeared at ringside again during Owen Hart's King of the Ring tournament final against Razor Ramon. He attacked Razor outside the ring, behind the referee's back, before Neidhart throwing Razor back for Hart to elbow drop and pin to become "The King of Harts", turning heel for the first time since 1988. Owen had been feuding with Bret since the Royal Rumble. Neidhart, believing Bret had held Owen back from his potential, sided with Owen, and usually cornering him in matches through the summer. Neidhart claimed he'd only helped Bret keep the WWF World Heavyweight Championship at King of the Ring so Owen could take it from him. This opportunity came in a steel cage match at SummerSlam. Neidhart sat in the third row during the match, behind other Hart family members. After Bret won the match, Neidhart entered the cage, locked it and helped Owen beat him down, while the Hart family members tried to climb over it and save him. Following SummerSlam, Neidhart teamed with Owen to face Bret and Randy Savage/The British Bulldog in a series of tag team bouts.

Neidhart joined Owen on Shawn Michaels' team, The Teamsters, to face Razor Ramon and The Bad Guys in an elimination match at Survivor Series. After they eliminated every Bad Guy except Razor, after Michaels inadvertently hit Diesel with the Sweet Chin Music. This caused an argument and the tag team partners split up, before Diesel chased Michaels down the aisle. As the other Teamsters tried to intervene, and all were counted out. Because Diesel and Michaels were WWF Tag Team Champions when they split, the title was vacated and a tournament held. Neidhart and Hart lost to The New Headshrinkers (Fatu and Sionne) in the first round on the December 31 Superstars, by disqualification. By the time it aired, Neidhart had left the WWF. Bret Hart wrote in his autobiography that the original plan was for Owen and Neidhart to win the tournament and the WWF Tag Team Championships, but Neidhart was officially fired due to no-showing events. Hart wound up winning the WWF Tag Team Championship at WrestleMania XI with new partner Yokozuna.

=== Various promotions (1995–1996) ===
After leaving the WWF once again, Neidhart returned to the ring in February 1995 for the Mid-Eastern Wrestling Federation (MEWF). Over the following months, he wrestled for various independent promotions. In April 1995, he returned to ECW, losing to Marty Jannetty and Ron Simmons on consecutive nights. After several more matches on the independent circuit, in July 1995 Neidhart made a one-night appearance with the Catch Wrestling Association in Graz, Austria, competing in the Euro Catch Festival. Later that month, Neidhart appeared with ECW once more, wrestling Marty Jannetty to a double disqualification. Over the following few months, he continued to wrestle on the independent circuit, briefly holding the MEWF Heavyweight Championship. In November and December 1995, Neidhart worked for the Catch Wrestling Association in Germany, competing in the CWA International Catch Cup tournament.

Neidhart wrestled sporadically throughout early-1996, including appearing at the World Wrestling Peace Festival in June 1996. He returned to the World Wrestling Federation later that month.

=== World Wrestling Federation (1996) ===
On the July 6, 1996, episode of Superstars, Neidhart returned to the WWF as the masked heel "Who", a gimmick designed for commentators Vince McMahon and Jerry Lawler to make "Who's on First?"-style jokes during his matches (all of which he lost). Who last appeared on TV in the "Bikini Beach Blast-Off" party on the SummerSlam pre-show. His last match was a win over Alex Porteau in Miami on September 12.

=== Various promotions (1996–1997) ===
After leaving the WWF once more, in October 1996 Neidhart wrestling in England for Hammerlock Wrestling. In December 1996, he began appearing with the New York-based independent promotion Ultimate Championship Wrestling. In March 1997, he appeared with the Sacramento, California-based National Wrestling Conference.

=== World Wrestling Federation (1997) ===
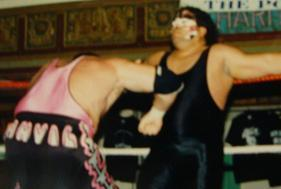
Neidhart (left) in 1997

Neidhart returned to the WWF once more on the April 28, 1997, episode of Raw is War, attacking Stone Cold Steve Austin and reuniting with Bret and Owen Hart as part of the expanded Hart Foundation, a stable of Canadian sympathizers, also including Davey Boy Smith and Brian Pillman. On July 6 at In Your House 16: Canadian Stampede in Bret's hometown Calgary, The Hart Foundation defeated the American team of Stone Cold Steve Austin, Ken Shamrock, Goldust and The Legion of Doom. Neidhart was part of Team Canada at Survivor Series in Montreal, teaming with The British Bulldog, Doug Furnas and Philip Lafon defeated Team USA Vader, Goldust, "Marvelous" Marc Mero and the debut of "The Lethal Weapon" Steve Blackman (Bulldog was the sole survivor, Neidhart was pinned by Vader).

After Bret and Davey Boy Smith left the WWF on bad terms because of the Montreal Screwjob at Survivor Series. D-Generation X (DX) leader and WWF Champion Shawn Michaels offered Neidhart a spot in the group on the November 24 episode of Raw Is War. Neidhart accepted, only for it to be revealed as a setup as the group assaulted Neidhart at the end of the show. The following week on the December 1 episode of Raw is War, DX member Triple H defeated Neidhart. After the match, DX attacked Neidhart once again and spray-painted "WCW" on his back and signifying him following Bret Hart to World Championship Wrestling. Sgt. Slaughter and Ken Shamrock saved him, before Slaughter and Shamrock attacked D-Generation X at the end of the show. His last match in WWF was when he defeated The Sultan at a house show on December 1. WWF announced that Neidhart was released from his WWF contract on December 2, 1997.

=== Return to WCW (1998) ===
Neidhart returned to World Championship Wrestling (WCW) on the January 12, 1998 episode of WCW Monday Nitro. The week prior, Ric Flair had given an interview in which he claimed to be a better wrestler than Bret Hart. After Neidhart rejected Flair's claim during an interview with Gene Okerlund, Flair attacked Neidhart, hitting him with a pair of brass knuckles and then applying a ringpost figure-four leglock to Neidhart until being driven off by Bret Hart.

Neidhart wrestled his first return match for WCW on the January 20, 1998 episode of WCW Saturday Night, defeating Wayne Bloom. In February 1998, Neidhart formed a tag team with the British Bulldog, who had also departed the WWF following the Montreal Screwjob. Neidhart and British Bulldog wrestled primarily on WCW Saturday Night and WCW Thunder, facing tag teams such as The Public Enemy, The Destruction Crew, High Voltage, nWo Japan, Sting and Lex Luger, and Brian Adams and Curt Hennig. In September 1998 at Fall Brawl '98: War Games, Neidhart and the British Bulldog defeated The Dancing Fools in a tag team match.

Neidhart's final televised match for WCW was on the September 26, 1998 episode of WCW Saturday Night where he and the British Bulldog lost to Stevie Ray and Vincent. Neidhart went on to wrestle on house shows until being released from WCW in October 1998.

=== Late career (1998–2016) ===
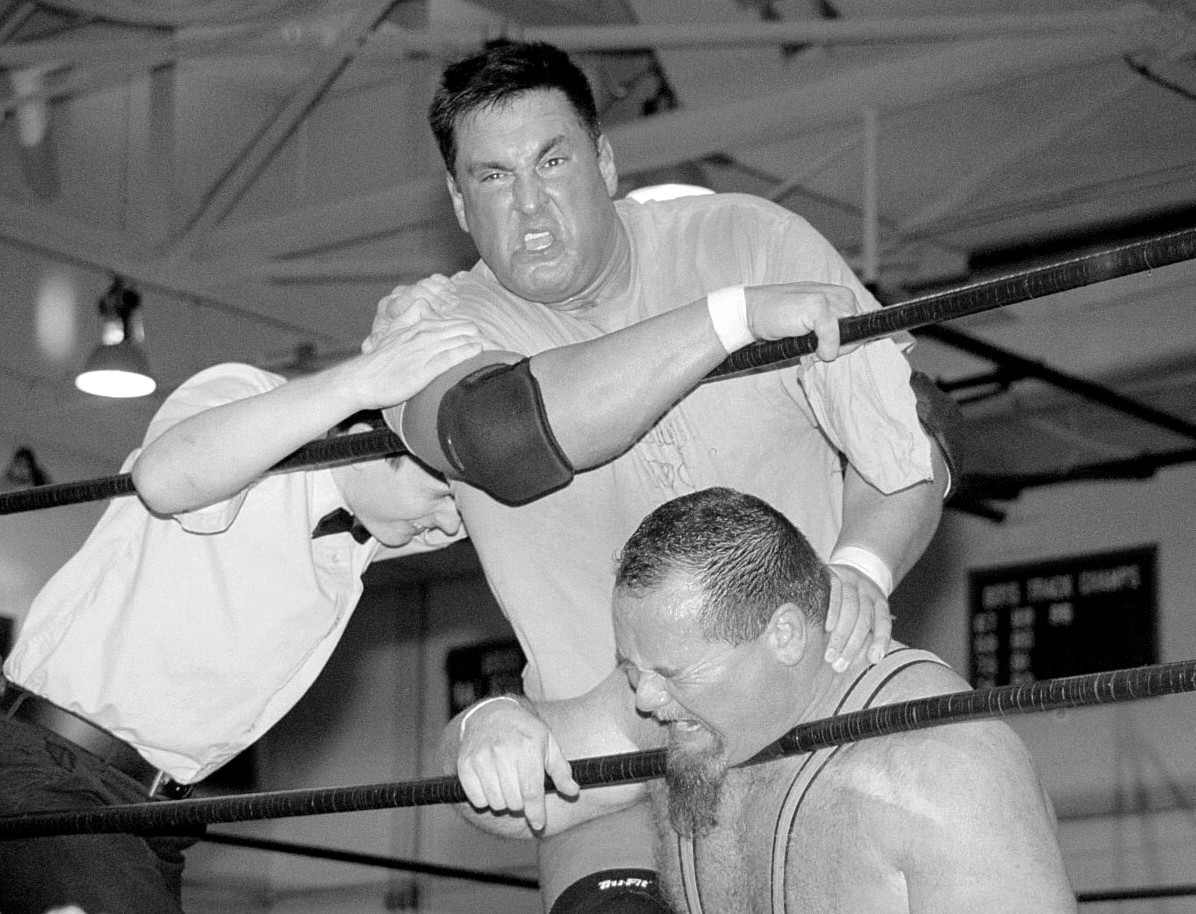
Neidhart in a wrestling match in 2009 against Salvatore Sincere

Following his departure from WCW, Neidhart largely retired from the ring, but continued to make sporadic appearances in independent shows. Notably, he was booked as Jake Roberts' singles opponent in the ill-fated Heroes of Wrestling event in October 1999. In 2000, he wrestled for a few appearances for Memphis Championship Wrestling. From 2000 to 2003 he wrestled in Canada for Elite Canadian Championship Wrestling, and Border City Wrestling. On January 17, 2003, he lost to Jim Duggan at Border City's main event at Algonquin College in Ottawa, Canada. On September 23, 2006, he defeated Norman Smiley at the UXW Florida Debut show in Orlando. He appeared in TNA on the November 12, 2009, episode of Impact! winning against Jay Lethal in his initial open challenge thrown out to the legends of professional wrestling.

On Raw XV, the 15th-anniversary WWE Raw special on December 10, 2007, Neidhart returned to WWE for the first time since 1997, and participated in the 15th Anniversary Battle Royal, eventually making it to the final five before being eliminated by Skinner.

Neidhart's last known match was on March 5, 2016, when he teamed with Koko B. Ware and Frankie the Pizza Guy as they defeated Nikolai Volkoff, Clay Dasher and Shawn Andrews at a BCW event in Williamsport, Pennsylvania.

== Professional wrestling style and persona ==
Neidhart usually wrestled in pink attire and the Hart Foundation tag team was nicknamed "The Pink and Black Attack". It popularized the Hart Attack finisher maneuver.

== Other media ==
On April 6, 2010, WWE released Hart & Soul: The Hart Family Anthology on DVD, which is a three-disc set featuring a documentary on the Hart wrestling family (including Neidhart) as well as 12 matches. Neidhart's daughter Natalie was featured as a main cast member on the reality show Total Divas, and he made appearances on the show along with his wife.

== Personal life ==
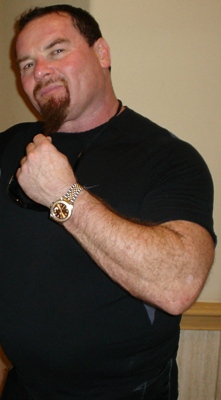
Neidhart in 2005

Neidhart and wife, Ellie Hart had three daughters; one, Natalie Neidhart-Wilson, is a professional wrestler under the ring name "Natalya", currently signed to WWE.

Neidhart was arrested on September 6, 2010, and charged with two counts of possession of controlled substances with intent to distribute, two counts of trafficking illegal drugs, one count of burglary of an unoccupied dwelling, and one count of third-degree grand theft for property stolen between $300 and $5,000. He was arrested after becoming aggressive with police after ingesting multiple pills outside a gas station. In March 2012, he was sentenced to five months and 29 days in jail. During his sentencing, he was arrested and held in contempt of court. Neidhart completed two stints in rehabilitation paid for by WWE.

== Death ==
According to TMZ, Neidhart's wife Elizabeth told investigators that on August 13, 2018, he was having problems sleeping and got out of bed to adjust the thermostat. As he went to touch it, he "turned weirdly as if he were about to dance", then fell against the wall and floor. She immediately dialed 911, believing he was having a seizure, something for which he took medication. He had a four-inch long gash on his face when emergency services arrived. He died at the scene at age 63, with the Pasco County Sheriff's Office stating to TMZ that their preliminary investigation believed he hit his head and succumbed due to his injuries, with foul play not being suspected. At the time, his wife stated his doctors believed he may have had Alzheimer's disease. WWE later paid tribute to Neidhart on their website.

== Championships and accomplishments ==
- Championship Wrestling from Florida
  - NWA Southern Heavyweight Championship (Florida version) (1 time)
  - NWA United States Tag Team Championship (Florida version) (1 time) – with Krusher Khruschev
- Canadian Pro-Wrestling Hall of Fame
  - Class of 2022 – as a member of the Hart Foundation
- Legends Pro Wrestling
  - Hall of Fame (2011)
- Memphis Championship Wrestling
  - MCW Southern Tag Team Championship (1 time) – with The Blue Meanie
- Memphis Wrestling Hall of Fame
  - Class of 2022
- Mid-Eastern Wrestling Federation
  - MEWF Heavyweight Championship (1 time)
- Mid-South Wrestling
  - Mid-South Tag Team Championship (1 time) – with Butch Reed
- New England Pro Wrestling Hall of Fame
  - Class of 2014
- Professional Wrestling Federation
  - PWF Heavyweight Championship (1 time)
- Pro Wrestling Illustrated
  - Ranked No. 61 of the top 500 singles wrestlers in the PWI 500 in 1994
  - Ranked No. 189 of the top 500 singles wrestlers of the PWI Years in 2003
  - Ranked No. 37 of the top 100 tag teams of the PWI Years with Bret Hart in 2003
- Pro Wrestling Ohio
  - PWO Tag Team Championship (1 time) – with Greg Valentine
- Stampede Wrestling
  - Stampede International Tag Team Championship (2 times) – with Hercules Ayala (1) and Mr. Hito (1)
  - Stampede Wrestling Hall of Fame (Class of 1995)
- Top Rope Championship Wrestling
  - TRCW International Heavyweight Championship (1 time)
- Universal Wrestling Alliance
  - UWA Heavyweight Championship (1 time)
- World Wrestling Federation/WWE
  - WWF Tag Team Championship (2 times) – with Bret Hart
  - WWE Hall of Fame (Class of 2019) - as a member of The Hart Foundation
- Wrestling Observer Newsletter
  - Feud of the Year (1997) with The Hart Foundation vs. Stone Cold Steve Austin
- Canadian Wrestling Hall of Fame
  - Individually
  - With the Hart family

== See also ==
- List of premature professional wrestling deaths
