= Davey Boy Smith =

English professional wrestler (1962–2002)

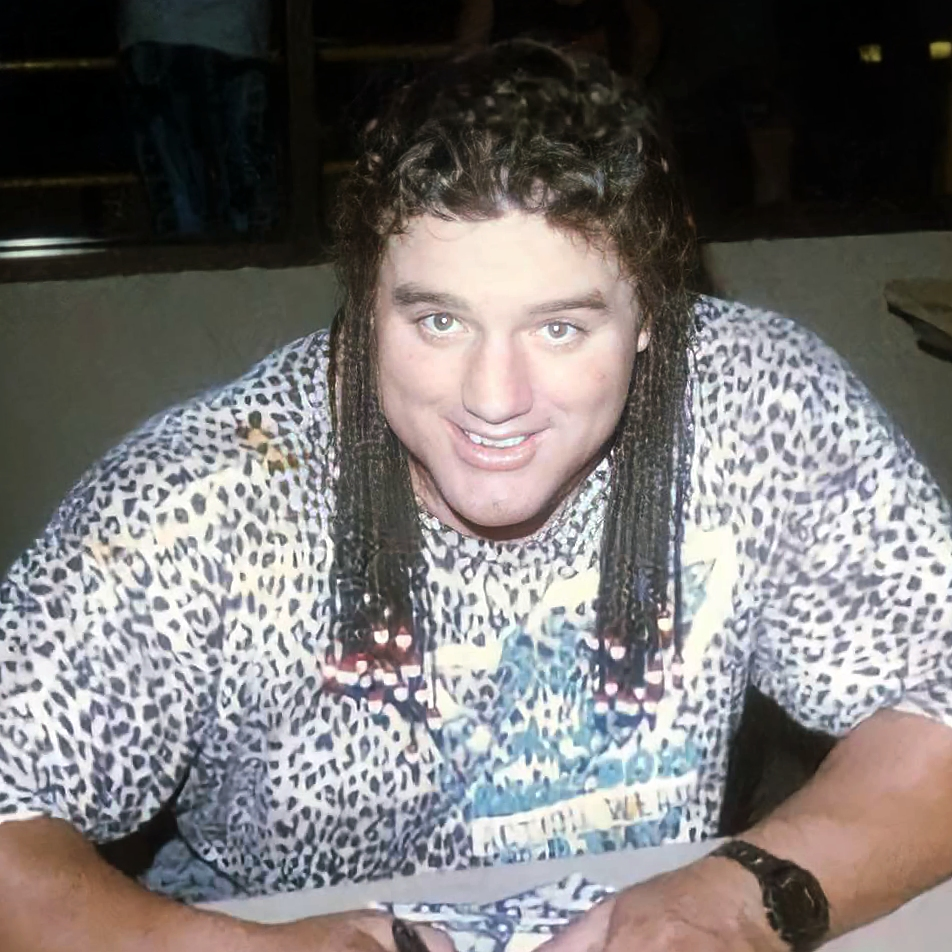

Personal information
- Born: David Smith; 27 November 1962 Golborne, Lancashire, England
- Died: 18 May 2002 (aged 39) Invermere, British Columbia, Canada
- Cause of death: Heart attack
- Spouse: Diana Hart (m. 1984; div. 2000)
- Children: 2; including Davey Boy Smith Jr.
- Relative: Thomas Wilton Billington Dynamite Kid (Cousin)
- Family: Billington; Hart (by marriage)

Professional wrestling career
- Ring names: The British Bulldog; Davey Boy Smith; Young David
- Billed height: 5 ft 11 in (180 cm)
- Billed weight: 260 lb (118 kg)
- Billed from: Leeds, England; Manchester, England
- Trained by: Ted Betley; Stu Hart
- Debut: 1978

David Smith (27 November 1962 – 18 May 2002) was an English professional wrestler best known for his appearances in the United States with the World Wrestling Federation under the ring names Davey Boy Smith and The British Bulldog.

Smith won titles within the WWF in three decades, from the 1980s to the 2000s. Though he was never a world champion, Smith headlined multiple pay-per-view events in the WWF and WCW, in which he challenged for the WWF and WCW World Heavyweight championships. He defeated Bret Hart for the WWF Intercontinental Championship in the main event of SummerSlam 1992 at London's original Wembley Stadium.

He was the inaugural and longest reigning WWF European Champion, across 206 days, and held the title on the sole occasion where a match for that championship headlined a pay-per-view event, at One Night Only in 1997. Prior to finding singles success, Smith achieved stardom as one half of The British Bulldogs tag team, alongside the Dynamite Kid. He was inducted into the WWE Hall of Fame in 2020.

== Early life ==
Smith was born in Golborne, where he grew up with his father Sid, mother Joyce, brother Terrence, and sisters Joanne and Tracy. Joyce's nephew was Tom Billington, also known as the Dynamite Kid, who was Smith's frequent tag-team partner, amongst others, most notably Brett (The Duke) Duquemin with whom he had moderate amateur success. He was born with measles in his eyes, which led to him often being the subject of bullying at his school, but he got laser surgery in his 30s. Smith enjoyed cricket, football and diving as hobbies.

== Professional wrestling career ==
=== Early career (1978–1981) ===
Smith started his training with Ted Betley at 13 after his grandfather and father noticed he needed to be involved in a positive activity. He started competing on ITV's World of Sport in 1978 when he was only 15, wrestling under the name Young David against 18 year old "Wonderboy" Bernie Wright, uncle of future WCW wrestler Alex Wright. Smith filled a spot in the promotion left by his slightly older cousin the Dynamite Kid, who had recently departed to wrestle in Calgary.

Mentored by the Dynamite Kid's friend Alan Dennison, in 1979, Smith appeared to have won the British Welterweight championship from Jim Breaks (as the Dynamite Kid had done two years prior) only for the win to be disallowed due to Dennison distracting Breaks. Smith then held Breaks to a 1–1 draw, as a result of which Dennison himself challenged and defeated Breaks for the belt.

=== Stampede Wrestling and New Japan (1981–1984) ===
Smith was then spotted by Bruce Hart, who was scouting talent in the UK, and like the Dynamite Kid before him, he travelled to Canada to wrestle for Stu Hart. Hart and Roy Wood trained Smith further in Hart's "Dungeon" and Smith became a key wrestler in Hart's Stampede Wrestling.

During his time in Stampede, he began a feud with the Dynamite Kid, and on 9 July 1982, Smith won his first title when he defeated the Dynamite Kid for the Stampede British Commonwealth Mid-Heavyweight Championship. In 1983, Smith debuted in New Japan Pro-Wrestling, where he became involved in a three-way feud with Dynamite Kid and The Cobra (George Takano) over the NWA Junior Heavyweight title. On 7 February 1984, a three-way, one-night tournament was held, and Smith lost to the Dynamite Kid via count-out.

After the tournament, Smith and Dynamite Kid formed a tag team in both New Japan and in Stampede Wrestling known as The British Bulldogs. In 1984, the Bulldogs made a shocking move by jumping to New Japan's rival, All Japan Pro Wrestling just before the start of All Japan's annual Tag Team tournament.

Smith made occasional return visits to the UK, appearing on World Of Sport in 1982 where he lost to Dave Finlay in an eliminator match for a shot at the British Heavy Middleweight Championship and 1983 where, as a complaining heel he defeated Bernie Wright in a rematch from the 1978 match.

=== World Wrestling Federation (1984–1988) ===
The Bulldogs, along with Smith's brothers-in-law Bret Hart and Jim Neidhart were brought in to the World Wrestling Federation (WWF) after Vince McMahon bought out Stampede Wrestling. At first, the Bulldogs were able to tour both WWF and All Japan, but eventually McMahon gained exclusive rights to the Bulldogs. Managed by Lou Albano, the Bulldogs began a long running feud with Hart and Neidhart, who were now known as The Hart Foundation. The Bulldogs also feuded with the Dream Team (Greg Valentine and Brutus Beefcake), and on 7 April 1986 at WrestleMania 2, with Albano and Ozzy Osbourne in their corner, the Bulldogs defeated the Dream Team for the Tag Team Championship.

The Bulldogs held the titles for nearly nine months, feuding with the Dream Team and Nikolai Volkoff and The Iron Sheik, but the Hart Foundation bested the Bulldogs to win the titles on 26 January 1987. After losing the titles, the Bulldogs gained a mascot, an actual bulldog who went by the name Matilda, and feuded with the likes of The Islanders (who in kayfabe dog-napped Matilda), Demolition, and the Rougeau Brothers. At Survivor Series on 26 November, The British Bulldogs and other face teams won a 10-on-10 Survivor Series tag team match. The following Survivor Series on 24 November 1988 produced the same result.

Later in 1988, The Bulldogs left the WWF, in part due to backstage problems, specifically between the Dynamite Kid and the Rougeau Brothers. The Bulldogs had allegedly pulled a number of ribs (pranks) on the Rougeaus. Curt Hennig also pranked the duo, who, assuming that the Bulldogs were behind that prank as well, retaliated: Jacques Rougeau knocked out four of Dynamite Kid's teeth with a fist filled with a roll of quarters. Though there are various accounts of this situation, many suggest that Billington drew first blood by bullying Rougeau (among many others including The Honky Tonk Man, whom Dynamite brought to tears) in Miami. No disciplinary action was taken against Jacques. Billington shortly afterwards quit the WWF over a dispute with WWF management over the issuance of complimentary plane tickets, over which he resigned from the company, and Smith followed suit.

=== Return to Stampede Wrestling; All Japan Pro Wrestling (1988–1990) ===
After leaving the WWF, the Bulldogs returned to Stampede Wrestling, and also to All Japan Pro Wrestling. Stampede officials were hopeful that the return of the Bulldogs would revive a struggling promotion, but they were unsuccessful. In May 1989, the decision was made to split up the Bulldogs, which caused some problems with All Japan owner Shohei Baba, who was still promoting the Bulldogs as a tag team.

On 4 July 1989, Smith, along with fellow wrestlers Chris Benoit, Ross Hart, and Jason the Terrible, was involved in a serious automobile accident. Smith, who was not wearing a seatbelt at the time, needed 135 stitches after slamming his head through the windscreen and being thrown 25 feet onto the pavement. He recovered, and the Bulldogs continued teaming in All Japan against teams such as Joe and Dean Malenko, Kenta Kobashi and Tsuyoshi Kikuchi, and The Nasty Boys. Personal problems began to surface between Smith and Billington, and Smith later left All Japan to return to the WWF.

=== Return to WWF (1990–1992) ===
Smith returned to the WWF in 1990, where he was pushed as the same character from the British Bulldogs' original WWF run, but this time as a singles star under the name "The British Bulldog", which he had trademarked during his earlier tag team run in the WWF, thus preventing his former partner Dynamite Kid from using the name. Smith returned to the WWF at a live event on 6 October, where he defeated Haku. Smith made his televised in-ring return on 27 October episode of Superstars, where he defeated The Brooklyn Brawler.

Over the next two years, Smith was a mid-carder and engaged in a long-running feud with The Warlord, in which he was victorious. He was a fairly popular performer in the United States, but was a huge attraction to fans in the United Kingdom, due in part to the WWF becoming a ratings hit on Sky Sports, as well as the promotion touring the country holding supercards such as UK Rampage. Smith competed in a 20-man battle royal at the Albert Hall on 3 October 1991, which he won by eliminating Typhoon. After entering as the first man in the 1992 Royal Rumble on 19 January, he eliminated Ted DiBiase, Jerry Sags and Haku before being eliminated by the eventual winner Ric Flair.

In 1992, due to Smith's newfound popularity in the United Kingdom, the WWF decided to hold its annual SummerSlam pay-per-view in Wembley Stadium in London. The show was main-evented by Smith (led to the ring by the then British, Commonwealth & European Heavyweight Boxing champion Lennox Lewis) and Bret Hart in a match for Hart's Intercontinental Championship. On 29 August at SummerSlam, in front of 80,355 of his homeland fans, Smith won the title in a match which is regarded by many wrestling experts as the finest in his career.

Smith lost the title to Shawn Michaels on 14 November at Saturday Night's Main Event XXXI, and was later released by the WWF. According to Bret Hart's book, the reason for Smith's release was that WWF owner Vince McMahon was made aware that Smith and Ultimate Warrior were receiving illegal shipments of human growth hormone (HGH) from a crooked pharmacist in England. Due to McMahon being investigated for illegally distributing steroids to WWF wrestlers, Smith and Warrior were released.

=== Eastern Championship Wrestling (1992–1993) ===
Shortly after leaving the World Wrestling Federation, Smith debuted in Eastern Championship Wrestling in December 1992, defeating Jimmy Snuka.

=== World Championship Wrestling and All Japan (1993) ===
In January 1993, Smith signed with World Championship Wrestling, debuting at SuperBrawl III on 21 February, defeating "Wild" Bill Irwin. Over the following weeks, he scored a series of wins on WCW WorldWide, WCW Main Event, and WCW Saturday Night, defeating a series of jobbers. In late March, Smith returned to All Japan Pro Wrestling for its Champion Carnival tournament. He scored a total of six points, defeating Danny Kroffat, Doug Furnas, and Johnny Ace but losing to Akira Taue, Kenta Kobashi, Mitsuharu Misawa, The Patriot, Stan Hansen, Steve Williams, Terry Gordy, and Toshiaki Kawada.

Upon returning from Japan, Smith formed an alliance with top protagonist Sting, and engaged in feuds with top antagonists Sid Vicious and Big Van Vader. At Slamboree on 23 May, Smith wrestled World Heavyweight Champion Vader, winning their title match via disqualification, but since titles do not change hands by disqualification, Vader retained the title. The feud continued afterwards, and culminated when Smith seemingly won the WCW World Heavyweight Championship from Vader on a tour of England in October, though the decision was reversed.

In July, Smith was reportedly involved in an altercation with a man at a bar who was making advances towards his wife. As a result of the ensuing legal issues that followed, WCW released Smith from his contract in December. His final pay-per-view appearance for WCW during this period came at Battlebowl on 20 November, where he was teamed with Kole in the first round of the Lethal Lottery; they lost to Road Warrior Hawk and Rip Rogers.

=== Return to England (1994) ===
In January 1994, Smith returned home to the United Kingdom and wrestled for Ring Wrestling Stars (formerly Joint Promotions). He was brought into the company by Max Crabtree to be his next top star after Big Daddy retired in December 1993 after suffering a stroke. During his time in RWS, Smith wrestled the likes of Jimmy Ocean, Ricky Knight, Drew McDonald, Karl Krammer, Kamikazi, Black Bart, Johnny Angel, Dale Preston, and Iron Duke Lynch, while primarily teaming with Tony Stewart.

=== Second return to WWF (1994–1997) ===
==== Allied Powers (1994–1995) ====
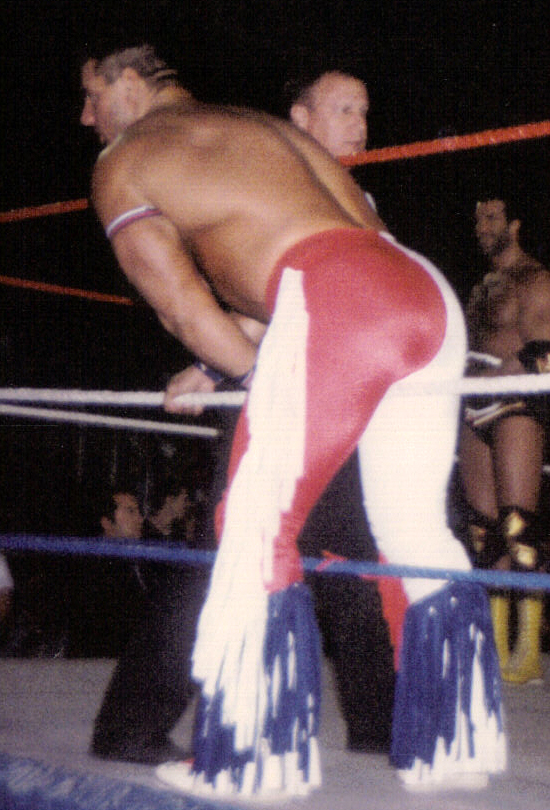
Smith entering the ring at a WWF event in 1995

Smith returned to the WWF at SummerSlam on August 29, 1994, where he immediately became involved in an ongoing family feud between Bret Hart and his brother, Owen Hart. Smith then teamed up with Bret against Owen and Jim Neidhart in a series of tag team matches, most notably in a victory on Monday Night Raw. On November 23, Smith appeared at Survivor Series in a 10-man elimination match; his partners were Intercontinental Champion Razor Ramon, 1-2-3 Kid, and The Headshrinkers. They faced WWF Tag Team Champions Shawn Michaels and Diesel, Owen Hart, Jeff Jarrett, and Jim Neidhart, but Smith was eventually counted out.

Smith again played a key part in the match at Survivor Series featuring his brothers-in-law Bret and Owen Hart, in which he supported Bret against Owen's benefactor, Bob Backlund. Smith was knocked unconscious by Owen, allowing Owen to take advantage of his brother's situation. Owen manipulated Bret's mother to surrender to Backlund on Bret's behalf, thus costing Bret to lose the match and the WWF Championship.

After entering the Royal Rumble as the second entrant on January 22, 1995, Smith and Shawn Michaels, who were the first entrants, were the final two remaining participants at the end. Smith tossed Michaels over the ropes and celebrated on the second turnbuckle. Only one of Michaels feet hit the floor and he was able to re-enter the ring and eliminate Smith from behind. Soon after, Smith began teaming with Lex Luger as the Allied Powers. On 2 April at WrestleMania XI, they defeated The Blu Brothers. At In Your House 2 on 23 July, they failed to win the Tag Team Championship from Owen Hart and Yokozuna.

Around this time, fans began getting tired of Smith being an English hero. At house shows, fans began chanting "USA, USA" which aggravated Smith. During a show at Madison Square Garden, The Allied Powers took on The Blu Brothers again, but before the match, Smith got on the microphone telling the fans to tone down the USA chant. They refused, and during the match, Smith walk out on Luger.

On an August episode of Monday Night Raw, the Allied Powers were supposed to face Men on a Mission, but Luger (kayfabe) no-showed the match; Smith found a replacement in the WWF Champion Diesel. During the match, Smith unexpectedly attacked Diesel and turned heel for the first time in his WWF career, helping Men on a Mission beat up Diesel and aligning himself with Jim Cornette's stable with Owen Hart and Yokozuna, who had been his adversaries just a month earlier, thus disbanding the Allied Powers.

Smith was to start a feud with Luger in a series of Flag Matches, but Luger returned to WCW and the feud was cancelled.

==== Camp Cornette, teaming with Owen Hart (1995–1997) ====
On 22 October at In Your House 4 in Winnipeg, Manitoba, Smith received a WWF Championship shot against Diesel, winning by disqualification after Bret Hart interfered. At Survivor Series on 19 November, Smith participated in the Wild Card eight-man elimination match, teaming with Shawn Michaels, Ahmed Johnson, and Sycho Sid and facing WWF Intercontinental Champion Razor Ramon, Dean Douglas, Owen Hart, and Yokozuna, which they won.

On 17 December at In Your House 5, Smith was granted a title shot against new WWF Champion Bret Hart, but was unsuccessful in winning. A notable incident from this match was that Hart bled during the match, which was controversial because WWF outlawed bleeding at the time. Smith entered the Royal Rumble on January 21, 1996, where he made it to the final four before being eliminated by Michaels. On 18 February at In Your House 6, he lost to Yokozuna by disqualification after Vader interfered. At WrestleMania XII on 31 March, he teamed with Vader and Owen Hart to defeat Yokozuna, Ahmed Johnson, and Jake Roberts.

In 1996, after Shawn Michaels became WWF Champion, Smith was put in a feud with the new champion. The feud was supposedly based on Smith's wife, Diana, accusing Michaels of hitting on her, which angered Smith and made him determined to take the title from Michaels. The two were the main-event of the In Your House 8: Beware of Dog pay-per-view on 26 May, and their match ended in a draw, leading to a rematch on 23 June at King of the Ring, where Smith failed to win the title.

Afterwards, Smith formed a tag team with his brother-in-law, Owen Hart, and the two soon won the WWF Tag Team Championship from The Smokin' Gunns. The team defended their titles against teams such as Doug Furnas and Phil LaFon, Vader and Mankind, and The Legion of Doom. In 1997, the WWF created the WWF European Championship, and Smith became the first ever holder of the title, winning a tournament which culminated in him defeating his own tag team partner, Owen Hart, in the finals on 26 February.

==== Hart Foundation (1997) ====
Hart and Smith later joined forces with Bret Hart, Jim Neidhart, and Brian Pillman to form a new form of the Hart Foundation, a heel faction which feuded with Stone Cold Steve Austin and other American wrestlers. This created an interesting rift between American fans, where the Hart Foundation were vilified, and Canadian fans, who revered the Hart Foundation. Smith and Owen dropped the WWF Tag Team Championship to Austin and Michaels, and lost the final match in a tournament for the vacant WWF Tag Team Championship to Austin and Dude Love. Smith lost the European Championship to Shawn Michaels on 20 September at One Night Only.

Smith was booked in the main event to defend the belt against Michaels. Michaels convinced Vince McMahon that he should win, as it would create build-up for his impending rematch with Bret Hart, and for a rematch against Smith at the next British pay-per-view. Smith initially resisted, arguing that he had put Michaels over in all of their previous matches, and that since it was his hometown, he should be able to win. However, he eventually reluctantly agreed to put Michaels over, and fans at the event, who gave Smith an ovation, voiced their displeasure by viciously booing Michaels and littering the ring with garbage.

On 9 November at Survivor Series in Montreal, Smith was part of Team Canada (alongside Jim Neidhart, Doug Furnas and Philip Lafon), defeating Team USA (Vader, Goldust, Marc Mero and the debuting Steve Blackman). The event became infamous for the "Montreal Screwjob", in which Vince McMahon manipulated the finish of Bret Hart's match and had him lose the WWF Championship to Michaels, despite Hart not submitting when placed in a Sharpshooter. Smith then paid money to leave the WWF for WCW, along with Bret Hart and Neidhart, soon afterward.

=== Return to WCW (1997–1998) ===
Smith rejoined WCW in late 1997, and began a feud with Steve McMichael, who was complaining about all the wrestlers coming from "Up North". Smith and Neidhart later formed a tag team, but were only featured sparingly on WCW Thunder. They challenged for the World Tag Team Championship on several occasions, but failed to win the titles. He suffered a knee injury in April 1998 that sidelined him for a month.

He suffered another, much more serious injury on 14 September 1998 at Fall Brawl during his match with Neidhart against The Dancing Fools, Disco Inferno and Alex Wright. During the match, while taking bumps, Smith twice landed awkwardly on a trapdoor that had been set up underneath the ring canvas to enable The Warrior to make a dramatic entrance in the night's main event. The result was a spinal infection that nearly paralysed Smith, hospitalising him for six months. While recuperating, Smith's WCW contract was terminated due to his inability to perform.

=== Third return to WWF (1999–2000) ===
In September 1999, Smith returned to the WWF. In keeping with the company's new "Attitude Era", Smith began wrestling in jeans instead of his usual Union Flag-adorned tights. His theme music was to a remix of his previous theme "Rule, Britannia!" and later to rock music, with the sounds of a dog barking as the song began. On 9 September episode of SmackDown! in Albany, New York, Smith defeated the Big Boss Man for the WWF Hardcore Championship. Smith forfeited the title later that evening, giving the belt back to Al Snow, because Boss Man had previously (kayfabe) dog-napped Snow's dog Pepper to win the title from him, and driving him insane in the process.

Smith then began pursuing the WWF Championship, eventually turning heel and beginning a feud with The Rock. Smith headlined Unforgiven on 26 September as part of a six-man WWF Championship match that was won by Triple H. On 2 October, Smith returned to England as a heel at Rebellion, defeating X-Pac.

Smith defeated D'Lo Brown for the WWF European Championship on SmackDown! on 26 October. He lost the title to Val Venis in a triple threat match on 12 December at Armageddon. On 6 May 2000 in London, Smith defeated Crash Holly for the Hardcore Championship. Holly regained the title from Smith in New Haven, Connecticut on 11 May episode of SmackDown!.

Smith's last televised match with the WWF was on Sunday Night Heat, when he burst into Eddie Guerrero and Chyna's locker room, accusing Guerrero, who was the European Champion at the time, of not treating the belt with the respect it deserved. This led to a European Championship title match on that Heat, in which both men were disqualified. After Heat, WWF announced that Smith had again left the WWF on 15 May 2000. Smith took a hiatus from wrestling.

=== Late career (2002) ===
Before his death on 18 May 2002, Smith had been training with the intent of resuming his career. He came out of retirement wrestling in two tag-team matches with his son, Harry Smith the previous weekend in Manitoba, Canada. Smith competed at Top Rope Championship Wrestling on 5 May and 11 May, teaming with Harry Smith in both matches and with Zack Murcury in his second match. He had also considered another return to the WWF.

== Professional wrestling style and persona ==
Due to his training in Stu Hart's Dungeon, Smith was renowned for both his technical skill along with his power moves, frequently performing multiple gorilla press slam variations and a delayed vertical suplex, where he would often hold the opponent in the air for an extended length of time to emphasize his strength. His finishing manoeuvre was a Running powerslam.

== Personal life ==
Some writers have claimed that Smith's middle name was actually "Boy", supposedly as the result of one of his parents mistaking the middle name field on Smith's birth certificate for the gender field.

Smith married his wife Diana at the Hart house in October 1984. They had two children, Harry (born 2 August 1985 in Calgary) and Georgia (born 26 September 1987, also in Calgary). In early January 2000, Smith and Diana divorced. Shortly after his release from the WWF in 2000, Smith entered an Atlanta drug rehabilitation clinic to treat his addiction to prescription opiate painkillers, including morphine, upon which he had become dependent following a 1998 back injury suffered while in WCW.

In 2000, Smith was arrested for allegedly threatening to kill Diana and her sister Ellie.

Following a July 1993 altercation at "The Back Alley," a Calgary bar, Smith was charged with aggravated assault against 19-year-old wrestler Kody Light after a dispute regarding how Light had spoken to Diana. The charges were later dropped.

Andrea Redding, Smith's girlfriend from 2000 to his death, stated that they were planning to get married shortly before his death.

He was a supporter of Manchester United FC.

== Death ==
Smith died on 18 May 2002 after suffering a heart attack while on holiday in Invermere, British Columbia, with his girlfriend Andrea Redding, who was Bruce Hart's estranged wife. He was 39 years old. Forensic scientist Julie Evans stated that although she had found steroids and painkillers in Smith's system, they were not at a life-threatening level. She instead concluded that Smith had died from natural causes associated with an enlarged heart. Bruce Hart claimed "Davey paid the price with steroid cocktails and human-growth hormones". Two funeral services were held, one by Andrea and the other by the Hart family. Bret Hart attended both.

== Other media ==
=== Video games ===
Video game appearances
Year	Title	Notes
1991	WWF WrestleMania	Video game debut. Cover athlete
1992	WWF Super WrestleMania	Genesis version only
1996	WWF In Your House	
1998	WWF War Zone	
1998	WCW/nWo Revenge	
1999	WCW/nWo Thunder	
1999	WCW Nitro	Nintendo 64 only
2000	WWF No Mercy	
2002	Legends of Wrestling II	
2004	Showdown: Legends of Wrestling	
2005	WWE SmackDown! vs. Raw 2006	
2009	WWE Legends of WrestleMania	
2010	WWE SmackDown vs. Raw 2011	Downloadable content
2012	WWE '13	
2015	WWE 2K16	
2016	WWE 2K17	
2017	WWE 2K18	
2018	WWE 2K19	
2020	WWE 2K Battlegrounds	Downloadable content
2022	WWE 2K22	Downloadable content
2023	WWE 2K23	
2023	WrestleQuest	
2024	WWE 2K24	
2025	WWE 2K25	

On March 24, 2024, Smith was the subject of the Biography: WWE Legends.

== Championships and accomplishments ==
- All Japan Pro Wrestling
  - 2 January Korakuen Hall Heavyweight Battle Royal Winner in 1989
  - World's Strongest Tag Determination League Fighting Spirit Award (1984, 1985) – with Dynamite Kid
  - World's Strongest Tag Determination League Skills Award (1989) – with Dynamite Kid
- Canadian Pro-Wrestling Hall of Fame
  - Class of 2024 – with Owen Hart
- Canadian Wrestling Hall of Fame
  - Individually
  - With the Hart family
- Independent Wrestling Association
  - IWA Heavyweight Champion (1 time)
- Pro Wrestling Illustrated
  - Match of the Year (1992) vs. Bret Hart at SummerSlam
  - Ranked No. 15 of the top 500 singles wrestlers in the PWI 500 in 1993
  - Ranked No. 53 of the top 500 singles wrestlers of the "PWI Years" in 2003
  - Ranked No. 5 and No. 84 of the top 100 tag teams of the "PWI Years" with the Dynamite Kid and Owen Hart, respectively, in 2003
- Stampede Wrestling
  - Stampede International Tag Team Championship (2 times) – with Bruce Hart
  - Stampede British Commonwealth Mid-Heavyweight Championship (1 time)
  - Stampede Wrestling International Tag Team Championship (2 times) – with the Dynamite Kid
  - Stampede North American Heavyweight Championship (2 times)
  - Stampede World Mid-Heavyweight Championship (1 time)
  - Stampede Wrestling Hall of Fame (Class of 1995)
- World Wide Wrestling Alliance
  - WWWA Intercontinental Champion (1 time)
- Wrestling Observer Newsletter
  - Best Wrestling Maneuver (1984) Power clean dropkick
  - Feud of the Year (1997) with The Hart Foundation vs. Stone Cold Steve Austin
  - Most Unimproved (1991)
  - Tag Team of the Year (1985) with the Dynamite Kid
- World Wrestling Federation / WWE
  - WWF European Championship (2 times, inaugural)
  - WWF Intercontinental Championship (1 time)
  - WWF Hardcore Championship (2 times)
  - WWF Tag Team Championship (2 times) – with the Dynamite Kid (1) and Owen Hart (1)
  - Battle Royal at the Albert Hall (1991)
  - WWF European Championship tournament (1997)
  - WWF World Tag Team Championship Tournament (1997) – with Owen Hart
  - WWE Hall of Fame (Class of 2020)

== See also ==
- Allied Powers
- British Bulldogs
- Hart Foundation
- John Hindley
- List of premature professional wrestling deaths
