= Hammer and sickle (disambiguation) =

The hammer and sickle (Russian: Serp i Molot: Серп и молот, "sickle and hammer") is the international symbol of communism.

The name may refer to:

- the flag of the Soviet Union, consisting of a yellow hammer and sickle and star on a red background
- Hammer & Sickle, a computer game
- Sickle and Hammer (film), a Russian silent film

== See also ==
- Serp i Molot (disambiguation)
