= Stu Hart: Lord of the Ring =

2002 biography written by Marsha Erb

- The second cover to the book, with Stu Hart at the Royal Navy gymnasium
- Author: Marsha Erb
- Language: English
- Subject: Wrestling
- Genre: Biography
- Published: 2002
- Publisher: ECW Press
- Publication date: March, 2002
- Publication place: Canada
- Media type: Hardcover and paperback
- Pages: 250
- ISBN: 978-1550225082

Stu Hart: Lord of the Ring (also known as Lord of the Ring - An Inside Look at Wrestling's First Family) is a 2002 biography of Canadian professional wrestler and promoter Stu Hart, written by journalist Marsha Erb and published by ECW Press. The book is generally considered to be the most in-depth work on Hart's life and career.

== Background ==
The book was authorized by the Hart family and published by ECW Press. Erb had worked with the family previously as the lawyer of Jim Neidhart, one of Hart's sons-in-law.

== Content ==
The book's initial focus is on the lives of Hart's grandfather and father, giving context to Hart's later life. It chronicles Hart's childhood with his father, mother and two sisters living in poverty on the Canadian prairie during the early 1910s and 1920s, his time as an amateur wrestler, and his military service and early career as an in-ring performer. It also covers the development of his relationship with his future wife, Helen Smith, and his time as a promoter and trainer of Stampede Wrestling.

The book covers Hart's experiences as a father to his twelve children (Smith, Bruce, Keith, Wayne, Dean, Ellie, Georgia, Bret, Alison, Ross, Diana and Owen), and how he managed to raise them all while handling Stampede Wrestling.

Like many other biographies of wrestlers, the book focuses on the period after the Great Depression, especially after World War Two, and offers general insight into the early wrestling industry in western Canada.

The book also features over thirty photographs courtesy of the Hart family.

== Reception ==
The Wrestling Observer Newsletter described the book as the most comprehensive work ever written about Hart's life, which covers his life all up until almost the end.

Sports journalist Heath McCoy notes in his book Pain and Passion: The History of Stampede Wrestling, which chronicles the wrestling territory which Hart owned and managed, that the book's description of the deal which turned over ownership of the promotion to Vince McMahon may have been inaccurate. The book implies that the deal was sealed with a verbal agreement, but Pain and Passion states that other sources indicated that there was a written agreement. McCoy nonetheless found the book to be of great value when writing Pain and Passion. He also noted that the book confirmed a few stories from the controversial book Under the Mat, which was written by Hart's youngest daughter, Diana, and published a few years earlier. McCoy elaborated on these in Pain and Passion.

The reviewer of ProWrestlingBooks.com considered the book one of the better wrestler biographies, stating that while it has many stories from the Stampede Wrestling promotion, it functions best as a coverage of an individual life story rather than of the Stampede territory. Hart's second oldest son, Bruce, liked the book but noted that readers would not learn much about the wrestling industry because his father revealed almost nothing about it.

== See also ==
- Bret "Hitman" Hart: The Best There Is, the Best There Was, the Best There Ever Will Be
- Hart House
- Hart Dungeon
- The Hart Foundation
- The Hart Dynasty
- Hart & Soul
