= Straight from the Hart =

2011 autobiography by Bruce Hart

- Cover to the book, featuring Bruce Hart
- Author: Bruce Hart
- Language: English
- Subject: Wrestling
- Genre: Autobiography
- Published: January 14, 2011
- Publisher: ECW Press
- Publication place: Canada
- Media type: Hardcover and paperback
- Pages: 272
- ISBN: 978-1550229394

Straight from the Hart is a 2011 autobiography by Canadian professional wrestler Bruce Hart. The book chronicles Hart's childhood in Calgary as a member of the Albertan Hart wrestling family, his career in the wrestling industry to his later life as a trainer. It was published by ECW Press. The book is one of a long line of books by or about members of Hart's family.

== Publication history ==
The book was first announced in May 2010.

In March Hart was interviewed about the book on WDFN Wrestling Elite and Monday Night Mayhem. On Monday Night Mayhem Hart explained that the motivation for him writing the book partly came from the fact that he believed that despite all of the many books about his family none of them did it justice. The cover blurb was revealed on June 10, 2010, and mainly described Hart's childhood and family relations. In February 2011 Hart had a 51-minute-long interview on Pro Wrestling Insider Elite about the book the interview covers Hart's, decision to write the book, other books on the Stampede era, his feelings upon learning as a child that pro wrestling is staged, running into problems with the Alberta Commission about the storylines he wrote for the characters and matches, places in the world he loved to wrestle in, being stabbed overseas, discovering Dynamite Kid (Tom Billington) in England, the loss of territories in modern pro wrestling and many other subjects covered in the book. The book was made available for immediate shipping on PWInsider.com's store, which through Amazon on January 8, 2011.

== Summary ==
Born as the second child of twelve to pro wrestling promoters Stu and Helen Hart, Bruce Hart grows up in the famed Hart House alongside his siblings Smith, Keith, Wayne, Dean, Ellie, Georgia, Bret, Alison, Ross, Diana and Owen. He learns the art of pro wrestling from his father in the family's school "The Dungeon" and works for his parents promotion Stampede Wrestling, travels the world while growing his family with his wife Andrea and at last ends up as his father before him, as a trainer of young wrestlers.

== Reception ==
Nathaniel Moore of The Globe and Mail described the book as an acute report painting a quintessential morality play about a Canadian independent company fighting for its own identity during the years of Ronald Reagan's cash-crazed United States. Writing for SLAM! Wrestling Jason Clevett expresses that the book helps add a new dimension to the legacy of the Hart family through some of its stories but that some of it gets lost due to Hart's bitterness towards the wrestling business and some members of his family.

Journalist Heath McCoy of the Calgary Herald expressed that the book is a way for Hart to try to gain some appreciation for his work in wrestling, which McCoy claims Hart believes he has not received to the level he deserves. Jose Marrero of WrestleView shares that view, stating that Hart has a reputation of being an individual who believes he never got his due and that those feelings translated into the book. He goes into detail, saying that Hart describes his tenure as a wrestling booker in a way that portrays him as a great writer who was a constant victim of others' maliciousness. Marrero also mentions that some of Hart's accounts surrounding his discovering Tom Billington, (a highly influential and revolutionary wrestler) who Hart brought to Canada from England are contradictory form those in Billingtons own autobiography, Pure Dynamite: The Price You Pay for Wrestling Stardom. The contradictions mainly centre around Billington's relationship with his younger cousin, Davey Boy Smith, who was also a highly successful wrestler, in his book Hart describes seeing Smith and Billington working together as wrestlers in Britain, but in Pure Dynamite it is implied that Billington and Smith barely knew each other before Billington had already moved to Canada and that Smith had only begun training to be a wrestler after Billington was already in Stampede Wrestling. Marrero stated that he found this to be very interesting. Marrero finished the review by examining the subject of Bruce's relationship with his younger brother, former world champion Bret Hart, whom Bruce has a very strained relationship with, Marrero concludes that if someone is a big Bret Hart fan they will not enjoy the book due to Bruce's repeated jabs at his brothers expense, some of which Marrero found deserved and others not.

The book was given a mildly positive review on the Pro Wrestling Torch podcast on May 3, 2011. Todd Martin ranked it as a solid read. Dante Spears of CultOfWhatever stated in his review that he felt that the book was more a biography of Hart's entire family and a history of the family's territory Stampede more than a book about Hart himself, which he found enjoyable. He expresses that the stories told in the book about Hart's family, life and career were all very interesting. David Bixenspan of CageSide Seats criticized the book concerning Hart recollection of many events, especially ones about Bret, stating: "The book is filled with statements that often come off as pretty out there, whether it's bad memory or an agenda or something else. A lot of these center around his brother Bret. The most outlandish-sounding claim is that when their mother Helen was on her deathbed and an hour away from dying, Bret entered her hospital room, saw his sister Diana (who had just written a controversial book about the family that was eventually recalled when Owen's widow Martha took legal action), and literally reached over his dying mother to grab his sister by the neck. Bruce then goes on to say that security guards had to pull Bret off and remove him from the room. When reached for comment, Bret's representatives told me that “Bret has no recollection of anything like that happening. In fact, when Helen died, he elected not to go to the hospital the night she died. In other words, what Bruce wrote is completely false.” (Also, in his book, Bret noted that Helen died at 3:30 AM local time while he was lying awake in bed.) A few sources who are well connected to the family told me that they had never heard the story before". Another example Bixenspan noted was that Hart's description of how he met his future wife Andrea did not at all coincide with the event was told in Heath McCoy's acclaimed book Pain and Passion: The History of Stampede Wrestling which portrays Hart as meeting her when he was a substitute teacher at her school. Despite this, he stated that the early parts of the book with stories of the Hart family were very much enjoyable. Writing for the Seattle Post-Intelligencer Glen Boyd expresses that Hart's book, on one hand, offers a fascinating inside look at the professional wrestling industry, with its colorful cast of characters and equally cutthroat behind the scenes politics but that it also serves as a forum for Hart to air some of his own issues in public, Boyd felt that if one reads between the lines it becomes "not hard to see through Hart's often harsh criticisms of his more famous siblings (this is especially true in the case of his brother younger Bret "Hitman" Hart), as not being at least a little colored by his own professional jealousy." Nonetheless, Boyd states that the book comes off as a candid retelling of Hart's life and that it often feels like reading a diary. Bret has dismissed many of the stories in the book, including claims that his signature look with black and pink duds and dark shades was inspired by Bruce.

== See also ==
- Hitman: My Real Life in the Cartoon World of Wrestling
