= Carl LeDuc =

Canadian professional wrestler (born 1974)

Personal information
- Born: September 24, 1974 (age 52) Montreal, Quebec, Canada
- Family: Paul LeDuc (father)

Professional wrestling career
- Ring name(s): Carl LeDuc; Carl XL; Francois Einstein; Frank Einstein; Lumberjack Leduc
- Billed height: 6 ft 3 in (191 cm)
- Billed weight: 251 lb (114 kg)
- Trained by: Stu Hart; Bruce Hart
- Debut: 1995

Carl LeDuc (born September 24, 1974) is a Canadian professional wrestler. He is best known working in various Quebec promotions, the World Wrestling Federation, Stampede Wrestling, and Impact Wrestling.

== Professional wrestling career ==
Being the son of Quebec wrestler Paul Leduc; he was trained by Stu Hart and his son Bruce at the Hart Dungeon in Calgary, Alberta. He made his wrestling debut in 1995 in Quebec.

On August 2, 1996, Leduc made his debut for the World Wrestling Federation (WWF) in Montreal when he defeated Justin Hawk Bradshaw, making it the first-ever wrestling match at the Molson Center. The next night he lost to Owen Hart in Quebec City. On August 4, he defeated Justin Hawk Bradshaw once again in Ottawa, Ontario. Throughout the fall and November 1996. Leduc worked for the WWF only when they were in Quebec and Eastern Canada defeating Aldo Montoya and losing to The Sultan.

He would then work for Stampede Wrestling in Calgary in 1997. During this time he appeared in the documentary Hitman Hart: Wrestling with Shadows, being stretched by Stu Hart.

In 1998, he made his only appearance in the United States when he worked for Music City Wrestling in Nashville.

LeDuc returned to Stampede Wrestling in 1999 as Frank Einstein until leaving in 2000 and returned to Quebec.

During most of his career, Leduc worked in the independent circuit in Quebec working for Northern Championship Wrestling, Canadian Wrestling Association and International Wrestling Syndicate. He co-owns his father's promotion, Federation Lutte Quebecoise since 2001 based in Montreal.

Leduc made an appearance for Total Nonstop Action Wrestling in Montreal winning a battle royal in a dark match for TNA Countdown To Slammiversary 2024.

He trained Eric Young in Toronto, Alex Silva and other wrestlers.

In summer 2021, Leduc opened a professional wrestling school, the LeDuc Pro Wrestling Academy, in Montreal.

== Championships and accomplishments ==
- Stampede Wrestling
  - Stampede International Tag Team Championship (1 time) - with Dick Raines
