= Greg Oliver =

Canadian sports writer (born 1971)

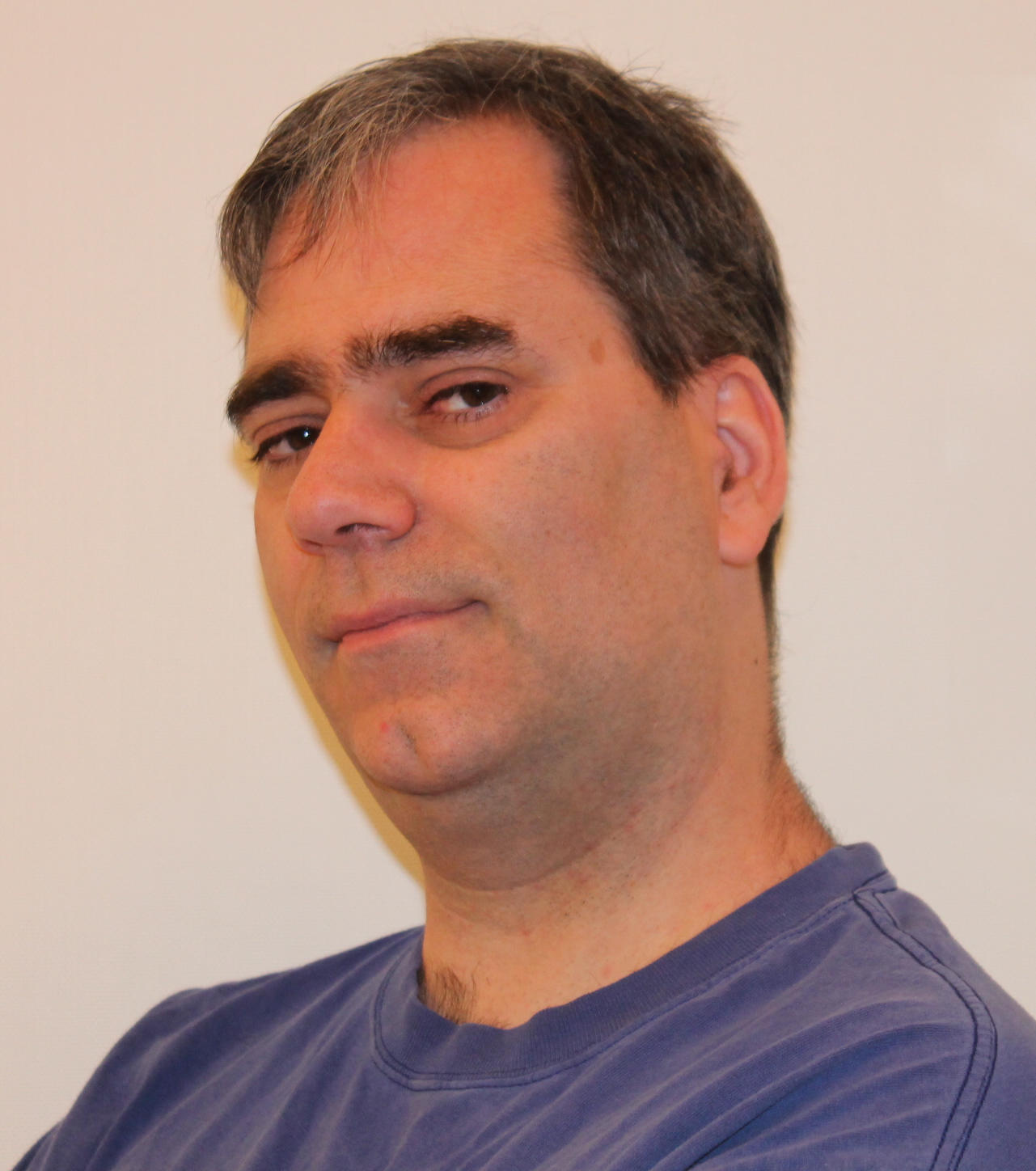
- Born: February 2, 1971 (age 55); Kitchener, Ontario
- Education: Bachelor of Applied Arts
- Alma mater: Ryerson Polytechnic University
- Occupations: Writer, editor
- Writing career
- Language: English
- Website: oliverbooks.ca

Greg Oliver (born February 2, 1971, in Kitchener, Ontario) is a Canadian sports writer. He currently resides in Toronto, Ontario, Canada.

== Early life and education ==
He earned a Bachelor of Applied Arts in journalism, newspaper major, in 1993 from Ryerson Polytechnic University.

== Writing ==
He is the author of seven books on professional wrestling, and six books on hockey. He is also the co-founder of the Slam Wrestling website, which began as a part of the Sun Media family on the Canoe.ca website. On June 1, 2020, Slam Wrestling ended its association with Postmedia and established SlamWrestling.net. In June 2025, Oliver announced he has left SlamWrestling.

Oliver has contributed to many other publications, including The Hockey News, Publishers Weekly, The Globe and Mail, The Toronto Sun, Kingston Whig-Standard, Kitchener-Waterloo Record, Atlanta Journal-Constitution, Fighting Spirit Magazine. As a teenager, he published The Canadian Wrestling Report (1985-1990).

Oliver's work has been reviewed by Booklist, Quill and Quire, Publishers Weekly, Winnipeg Free Press, London Free Press, Kitchener-Waterloo Record, New York Journal of Books. Don't Call Me Goon: Hockey's Greatest Enforcers, Gunslingers, and Bad Boys, made The Globe and Mail Top 10 for non-fiction in October 2013, and Gibby: Tales of a Baseball Lifer written with baseball's John Gibbons rose to #2 on Canada's non-fiction bestseller list.

The 2017 documentary, Sweet Daddy Siki, about professional wrestler Reginald "Sweet Daddy" Siki, was written by Oliver. In March 2025, the documentary Lunatic: The Luna Vachon Story about Luna Vachon was released, with Oliver as an associate producer.

In September 2021, it was announced that Oliver is working with Madusa Debrah Miceli on her autobiography, covering her time in wrestling and in monster trucks. The Woman Who Would Be King: The MADUSA Story came out in the spring of 2023 from ECW Press. John Lister at Pro Wrestling Books wrote: “Definitely more of a life story than a wrestling book, this should still appeal to Miceli’s fans.”

In February 2024, Oliver teamed with Canadian comedian Eric Johnston on Run with the Bull: Three Generations of Sports and Entertainment (with Joseph Casciaro), which not only details Johnston's adventures in comedy and acting, but also his family's history in professional wrestling, namely his grandfather, Bull Johnson, father, Bullwhip Danny Johnson and uncle Randy Johnson.

Game Day: The Uncensored Life of an NHL GM, written with former NHL coach, GM and team executive Doug MacLean came out in October 2026 from Simon & Schuster and was an instant Canadian bestseller.

== Criticism ==
In July 2008 Bret Hart spoke about Oliver at the George Tragos/Lou Thesz Professional Wrestling Hall of Fame during the induction banquet for his father Stu Hart. Upset over his ranking in one of Oliver's books – #14 in the greatest Canadian performers, behind midget wrestler Sky Low Low – Hart called Oliver a "charlatan". Sports journalist Heath McCoy also criticized Oliver for his placement of Hart, asking if he was joking with that decision and saying the book was highly biased toward Ontario wrestling.

== Works ==
- The Pro Wrestling Hall of Fame: The Canadians (2002) ISBN 9781550225310
- The Pro Wrestling Hall of Fame: The Tag Teams (with Steven Johnson) (2005) ISBN 9781550226836
- The Pro Wrestling Hall of Fame: The Heels (with Steven Johnson) (2007) ISBN 9781550227598
- Benoit: Wrestling with the Horror that Destroyed a Family and Crippled a Sport (with Steven Johnson, Irv Muchnick and Heath McCoy) (2007) ISBN 1550228129
- SLAM! Wrestling: Shocking Stories from the Squared Circle (Editor, with Jon Waldman) (2009) ISBN 9781550228847
- The Pro Wrestling Hall of Fame: Heroes & Icons (with Steven Johnson) (2012) ISBN 9781770410374
- Written in Blue and White: The Toronto Maple Leafs Contracts and Historical Documents from the Collection of Allan Stitt (2014) ISBN 9781770412156
- The Goaltenders' Union: Hockey's Greatest Puckstoppers, Acrobats, and Flakes (with Richard Kamchen) (2014) ISBN 9781770411494
- Don't Call Me Goon: Hockey's Greatest Enforcers, Gunslingers, and Bad Boys (with Richard Kamchen) (2015) ISBN 9781770410381
- Duck with the Puck (with Quinn Oliver) (2015) ISBN 1499156367
- Blue Lines, Goal Lines & Bottom Lines: Hockey Contracts and Historical Documents from the Collection of Allan Stitt (2016) ISBN 9781770412514
- Father Bauer and the Great Experiment: The Genesis of Canadian Olympic Hockey (2017) ISBN 9781770412491
- Gratoony the Loony: The Wild, Unpredictable Life of Gilles Gratton (2017) ISBN 9781770413375
- Santa's Day Job (2018) ISBN 1721176314
- The Pro Wrestling Hall of Fame: The Storytellers (From the Terrible Turk to Twitter) (with Steven Johnson) (2019) ISBN 1770415025
- Who's The Man? Billy Van! (with Stacey Case) (2020) ISBN 9781777344009
- Mat Memories: My Wild Life in Pro Wrestling, Country Music, and with the Mets (with John "Alexander" Arezzi) (2021) ISBN 9781770415645
- Gibby: Tales of a Baseball Lifer (with John Gibbons) (2023) ISBN 9781770417106
- The Woman Who Would Be King: The MADUSA Story (with Debrah Miceli) (2023) ISBN 9781770416710
- Run with the Bull: Three Generations of Sports and Entertainment (with Eric Johnston and Joseph Casciaro) (2024) ISBN 1777344026
- Game Day: The Uncensored Life of an NHL GM (with Doug MacLean) (2026) ISBN 978-1-6682-1404-6

== Awards ==
- 2021 Bill Fitsell President's Award from the Society for International Hockey Research
- 2020 James C. Melby Historian Award from the Cauliflower Alley Club
- 2008 James Melby Memorial Award for wrestling journalism from the George Tragos/Lou Thesz Professional Wrestling Hall of Fame

== Personal ==
He is married to author Meredith Renwick, and he worked on the book, Duck with the Puck, with their son, Quinn Oliver. His brother, Chris Oliver, is a well-known college basketball coach and instructor.
