= Pain and Passion: The History of Stampede Wrestling =

2005 book by Heath McCoy

- Cover to the 2007 updated revision edition, featuring Bret Hart and the Dynamite Kid
- Author: Heath McCoy
- Language: English
- Subject: Professional wrestling
- Genre: History book
- Publisher: CanWest, ECW Press
- Publication date: 2005
- Publication place: Canada
- Media type: Hardcover and paperback
- Pages: 336
- ISBN: 978-1550227871

Pain and Passion: The History of Stampede Wrestling is a 2005 history book written by Heath McCoy about the Canadian professional wrestling promotion Stampede Wrestling and its associated wrestling territory. It was published by CanWest and later ECW Press and was well received by former workers of the organisation as well as journalists of the professional wrestling industry.

== Publication history ==
The book was initially released in 2005 and was published by CanWest. In 2007 McCoy and ECW Press release a revised and updated version. The second edition contains a bonus chapter which covers the development of several key persons of the book since the originals release. Some of the revisions concerned professional wrestler Chris Benoit which were added in because McCoy felt that it would be wrong for him to write a book about Stampede Wrestling and only mention Benoit's double murder and suicide in passing.

== Content ==
The book covers time before the promotion's founding when focusing on its founder and owner Stu Hart, his childhood, amateur wrestling time, military service and early career as a professional wrestler as well as the courtship of his future wife Helen Smith. Its main focus is as the title says Stampede Wrestling, its founding as well as its highs and lows in the industry beginning in 1948 under the name Klondike Wrestling. By 1952 Hart had purchased another minor promotion in the Alberta area, merged them and renamed it Big Time Wrestling. It was later renamed Wildcat Wrestling and finally Stampede Wrestling. The book also centers in large parts on the Hart wrestling family and their work for the promotion. All of Hart's twelve children receive coverage in the book and mainly focuses on how Hart's descendants have influenced the promotion and kept it alive.

== Reception ==
The book is critically acclaimed and widely regarded as the most in depth coverage of the Stampede territory to date.

Sports journalist and wrestling historian Dave Meltzer expressed that the book was fantastic and that people should try to acquire the updated edition from 2007.

== See also ==
- Hart House
- Hart Dungeon
- Stu Hart: Lord of the Ring
- The Hart Foundation
- The Hart Dynasty
- Under the Mat
- Hart & Soul
