= Under the Mat =

Book by Diana Hart

- Cover to the original published book.
- Author: Diana Hart; Kirstie McLellan; Foreword; Stu Hart (Note: Although the foreword is credited to Stu Hart, it has been disputed, notably by Stu's son Bret, as to whether he actually wrote it.)
- Original title: Under the Mat: Inside Wrestling's Greatest Family
- Language: English
- Genre: Biography
- Publisher: Fenn
- Publication date: 2001
- Publication place: United States and Canada
- Pages: 200 pp
- ISBN: 1-55168-256-7
- OCLC: 47270558
- Dewey Decimal: 796.812/092/2 B 21
- LC Class: GV1196.A1 H34 2001

Under the Mat: Inside Wrestling's Greatest Family is a book co-written by Diana Hart (daughter of Stu and Helen Hart, ex-wife of Davey Boy Smith and mother of Harry Smith) and journalist Kirstie McLellan. The subtitle, Inside Wrestling's Greatest Family, refers to the Canadian Hart wrestling family, which includes wrestlers such as Smith Hart, Bruce Hart, Keith Hart, Dean Hart, Bret Hart, Ross Hart, Owen Hart, Teddy Hart, David Hart Smith and Natalya Neidhart among others. The book is highly controversial and was pulled from stores after Martha Hart, widow of Owen Hart and Diana Hart's sister-in-law, filed a lawsuit. The book became an Alberta top ten nonfiction best-seller on its release.

== Background ==
The writing of the book was at least partially motivated by the death of her younger brother Owen Hart. Hart has also stated that she hoped that the book would lead to her brother Bret respecting her and taking her seriously, which she did not feel he had done during the investigation and trial which surrounded the death of Owen Hart.

McLellan has stated that she and Hart know each other personally and Hart approached her to make the book together.

== Summary ==
The book focuses mainly on the realities of professional wrestling. Under the Mat recounts Diana's life growing up in the Hart House, being sister to Owen and Bret, witnessing their rise to fame and the terrible tragedy which claimed Owen's life. She remembers her father training some of the WWF's and WCW's biggest names in her family's basement gym, the famous Dungeon, and recounts their tales to stardom.

In the chapter "Roots" she also discusses her family's history on her mother's side. It focuses mostly on her grandfather, American marathon runner Harry Smith.

== Reception ==
The book has received generally negative critique. It has been criticised for its factual errors, grammatical mistakes, spelling issues and unstructured content. It has also been criticised for its overwhelming focus on negative events. According to employees of the Toronto-based law firm Cassels Brock & Blackwell LLP, a preliminary review of the book identified dozens of significant factual errors.

=== Controversy ===
Hart has been accused of using Under the Mat as a way to express the "dirty secrets" of the Hart family and friends. Hart elaborates on negative details related to several people including Dynamite Kid, Bret Hart, Martha Hart, Andrea Hart and Davey Boy Smith. People like Dynamite Kid, Ben Bassarab, Davey Boy Smith and Jim Neidhart are in the book accused of several occasions of criminal activity. Hart has especially been accused of trying to discredit her brother Bret Hart and attempting to portray him as an obsessive egomaniac.

Toronto Star book reviewer Michael Holmes stated that the book was "terribly underwritten, ridiculously simplistic and pointlessly episodic, repetitive and error-riddled." He also said that the book was "one of the most manipulative, megamaniacal, deliberately unselfconscious books I have ever read. Reading it makes you feel dirty."

Initially, when asked about whether she had noticed any backlash from family or others, such as Jim Neidhart, Diana stated that she did not care what Neidhart thought about the book. She also stated that the book was not intended to be vindictive and that she is very proud to be a Hart.

Her brother Bret is a vocal critic of the book and has said that it is a very disturbing read and called it pornographic. He goes on to say that there are enough true Hart stories that Diana did not need to resort to fiction. Bret and others have also questioned the legitimacy of the foreword which Diana claims to be written by their father, Stu. McLellan has stated that Bret was very upset by the book and that he confronted her about it in public at a gym which they both went to at the time.

One of her other brothers, Bruce, has also criticised the book, and called it "ill conceived" and expressed that he cannot understand why his sister would write such a book. He has hypothesized that Hart may have been mentally unstable at the time of the writing.

Legal action was pursued by Martha Hart, Owen Hart's widow. Martha claims that Diana made inaccurate and irresponsible statements about her and her family. She stated that the book was “filled with distortions, misstatements and unjustified slurs that attempt to destroy the reputation of my family and me, and undermine the memory of Owen.” Diana defended herself in an interview for the National Post and stated that she stood by what she has written, insinuating that Martha was a rich bully who was trying to use her money to suppress her recounts. She stated "Martha has money to fight me on it and I don't. I know what I have written is true." The book was pulled from bookstores across Canada by publisher H.B. Fenn and Co. Ltd. in January 2002. Removing the book was part of a settlement between Martha Hart and the publisher. As part of the settlement, the publisher expressed its regrets and a financial settlement was paid to the Owen Hart Foundation, a Calgary-based charity created by Martha.

Long-time wrestling announcer and Stampede alumni Ed Whalen also discredited the book, referring to it as a "fairy tale" and considered joining Martha Hart in the lawsuit.

Hart has later asserted that the stories that were printed in the book, were completely twisted and changed from how she had written them originally, and was deeply hurt by the controversy that was caused for her family from the book. Her brother Bret has questioned her claim that she was not aware of the book's content before publication.

=== Legitimacy ===
Heath McCoy, the author of the book Pain and Passion: The History of Stampede Wrestling has stated that there is some truth to some of the statements in the book, such as Hart's claim of her mother Helen's alcoholism.

Tom Billington, professionally known as The Dynamite Kid, admitted to some of the criminal actions he was accused of in the book.

== Aftermath ==
Martha Hart's book, Broken Harts: The Life and Death of Owen Hart, was partially written in response to Under The Mat.

Diana Hart has since disowned the book and called it a failure as a journey and has stated that she is now on good terms with her brothers and sisters, though the book remains listed in her author bio in her more recent books.

McLellan has stated that Hart took her on "an amazing journey" when writing the book. After the release of Under the Mat, McLellan has helped write several other nonfiction books and autobiographies, including the best selling autobiography of former National Hockey League (NHL) player Theoren Fleury named Playing with Fire.

== Sources ==
- Greg Oliver (June 5, 2001). "Diana Hart book out this fall". SLAM! Wrestling. Archived from the original on August 17, 2015.
- Greg Oliver (October 4, 2001). "Mother's health, book on Diana Hart-Smith's mind". SLAM! Wrestling. Archived from the original on August 18, 2015.
- Greg Oliver (October 26, 2001). "Diana Hart book will shock". SLAM! Wrestling. Archived from the original on April 28, 2015.
- "Diana Hart Chat". SLAM! Wrestling. November 2, 2001. Archived from the original on August 17, 2015.
