= Benoit (book) =

2007 book about wrestler Chris Benoit

Benoit: Wrestling with the Horror that Destroyed a Family and Crippled a Sport
- Cover
- Authors: Heath McCoy; Greg Oliver; Steven Johnson; Irvin Muchnick
- Language: English
- Subject: Professional wrestling, murder, suicide, concussion, steroids, death, journalism
- Genre: Biography
- Published: 2007
- Publisher: ECW Press
- Publication place: Canada
- Media type: Hardcover and paperback
- Pages: 180
- ISBN: 1550228129

Benoit: Wrestling with the Horror that Destroyed a Family and Crippled a Sport is a 2007 non-fiction book co-written by sports journalists Heath McCoy, Greg Oliver, Steven Johnson, and Irvin Muchnick. about the Canadian professional wrestler Chris Benoit and his murder-suicide of his family. It consists of four essays, one by each author, about Benoit, his wife Nancy and their 7-year-old son Daniel, their deaths, and the aftermath of the murders. The book was released by the Canadian publisher ECW Press in October 2007.

== Publication history ==
The book was released in October 2007 and include an introduction which is followed by four essays that each discuss the subject from a distinct perspective.

- The media's coverage of the story and the role of the media in the story itself is covered first by Steven Johnson, investigative reporter. His essay was named "Roids, Reporters, and Rasslin': Anatomy of a Feeding Frenzy".
- Heath McCoy looks over the facts of the case and examines Benoit's Alberta wrestling roots in Stampede Wrestling with the Hart family. His essay was titled "Stampede Days: A Crippler on the Rise".
- Irvin Muchnick gives his opinion on the pop-cultural relevance and the place of this tragedy in the history of professional wrestling. His essay was named "Day of the Dead".
- Greg Oliver discusses the Benoit story in the context of the professional wrestling industry and personal correspondence with Benoit.

To advertise the book Oliver went on Entertainment Tonight Canada and McCoy went on Live Audio Wrestling to be interviewed.

== Reception ==
Pre-orders of the book establish it as one of the 400 top-ranked sellers at Amazon Canada by September 26. Interest was mainly fueled by the two-part interview with co-author Greg Oliver the same week on the Canadian edition of Entertainment Tonight. By May 2008 it was the number one book on Amazon.ca's wrestling category.

Shaun Smith of Quill & Quire stated that Muchnick finished the book with a "gem", feeling that his segment assembled the facts but let the reader connect the dots. Mike Jenkinson of SLAM! Wrestling expressed that he was leery when approaching the book, worrying that it would be a "rush job" but that it was far better than he expected it to be even with many faults. Bryan Dykens of the Online World of Wrestling gave the book a score of 8/10 and expressed that the book told the story of the Benoit tragedy as straightforward as it had ever been told. Patrick Hickey Jr. of Reviewfix felt that the book was a satisfying read by featuring "a near perfect blend of commentary, journalism and nostalgia" and that it is a quick read that any serious wrestling fan should take a look at.

The book was nominated for Best Pro Wrestling Book at the 2008 Wrestling Observer Newsletter awards.
