= The Marigold =

2023 novel by Andrew Sullivan

- First edition cover
- Author: Andrew F. Sullivan
- Publisher: ECW Press
- Publication date: May 18, 2023
- ISBN: 978-1-778-52102-7

The Marigold is a Canadian dystopian novel by Andrew F. Sullivan published by ECW Press in 2023.

Set in a futuristic Toronto, The Marigold focuses on a wide variety of characters who are all joined by The Marigold, a fictitious building being overcome by a toxic sentient mold known colloquially as The Wet.

== Plot ==
In the city of Toronto, sometime in the near future, Stanley Marigold, the son of a real estate developer who built the Marigold, a sky rise building, plans on making the Marigold II. However the Marigold was cheaply built and is continually falling apart, the residents increasingly hearing voices.

Across the city public health inspectors Jasmine and Catherine are investigating a mold colloquially known as The Wet. During one of her investigations Catherine is grabbed by a hand-like substance and begins to believe The Wet is sentient.

Henrietta, a young girl who lives near a sink hole, witnesses Cherry, a boy she has a crush on, yanked away by The Wet. She and her best friend, Alma, decide to try to rescue him. Once in the sinkhole they are guided by a creature that calls himself Cabeza who has been rejected by the wet.

Soda, a member of the gig economy, finds his life falling apart when he is handed a USB drive with secret information on it. He takes it to his father, Dale, who tells him to take it to Stanley.

Stanley eventually offers Soda a job working for him as he wants to harness The Wet as a weapon. Instead Soda tries to feed him to The Wet. Stanley rejects it and dies, rather than become one with the sentient mass.

Jasmine is eventually subsumed into The Wet while Alma is also subsumed trying to save Henrietta. Catherine and Henrietta meet up in the basement of The Marigold where they are both investigating and manage to escape together, becoming possibly the only human survivors in Toronto.

The city is overtaken by raccoons.

== Reception ==
The novel received mostly positive reviews. Publishers Weekly called it "impressively bleak".

It went on to become a Canadian Independent Bestseller.
