= Stoddart Publishing =

Canadian publishing imprint (1984–2002)

- Parent company: General Publishing Co.
- Predecessor: Musson
- Founded: 1984
- Defunct: 2002
- Country of origin: Canada
- Key people: Jack Stoddart
- Publication types: Books

Stoddart Publishing was a Canadian book publisher and distributor, owned by Jack Stoddart, which ceased operations in 2002.

== History ==
Jack Stoddart Sr., began as a sales rep for Macmillan Inc. for $12 a week during the Depression and worked his way up to sales manager before buying General Publishing in 1957. His children, Jack Jr. and Susan, also worked for their father's company. By the 1980s, Jack Jr. had purchased a major part of General's operations. Around that time, Susan acquired Paperjacks, the mass-market part of the company. She later became the head of Distican, which represents a number of major foreign publishers.

In 1967, General Publishing purchased the Musson Book Company, based in Toronto, from British publisher Hodder & Stoughton. Musson provided publishing services in Canada for other publishing houses, in addition to publishing its own line of Canadian authors. In 1984, Stoddart Publishing became an imprint of General Publishing, taking over the line of Canadian authors from Musson.

Jack Jr. also had the lucrative Simon & Schuster agency work in Canada, until losing the account to his sister in 1994.

In 1995, Stoddart published a book by photographer Jock Carroll, Glenn Gould: Some Portraits of the Artist as a Young Man, being a collection of photographs of the late Canadian pianist, accompanied by captions written by Carroll. The photographs and narrative were based on an interview with and photos taken by Carroll of Glenn Gould in 1956, at the initiative of Gould's agent. Gould had died in 1982. Gould's estate and his personal corporation sued Stoddart and Carroll for misappropriation of personality without consent or compensation. The actions were unsuccessful, based on Gould's unrestricted consent given at the time of the 1956 photo session and interview.

In 2000, Stoddart published Bret "Hitman" Hart — The Best There Is, The Best There Was, The Best There Ever Will Be, by Canadian professional wrestler Bret Hart. The autobiography had an initial print run of 150,000 books, far surpassing Stoddart's previous record print of 20,000 for a single book.

In 2002, General Publishing filed for bankruptcy protection. The bankruptcy resulted in the closure of the majority of its corporate subsidiaries, including Stoddart Publishing. At the time that Stoddart ceased operations, it was the publisher of a number of Canadian writers, including Arthur Black, Pierre Berton, Thomas d'Aquino, Rod McQueen, David Foot, David Suzuki, Walter Stewart and Judy Rebick.

In May 2002, an Ontario court ruled that General Publishing would be sold off to pay debts that amount to more than $45 million. The Bank of Nova Scotia offered to loan the publisher $2.5 million money to keep it from being pushed into bankruptcy. Stoddard sold House of Anansi to businessman Scott Griffin; and Boston Mills to Lionel Koffler of Firefly Books.

Jack Stoddart Jr. died on January 21, 2019, at the age of 74.

== Subsidiaries ==
- Macfarlane, Walter & Ross
- Boston Mills Press
- General Distribution Services
- House of Anansi Press
- Irwin Publishing
- General Distribution Services Inc

== Distributed publishers ==
As of 1996, Stoddard served as the Canadian distributor for several publishers, including Albert Whitman and Co, Allison & Busby, Andersen Press, Aperture, Aurum Press, Better Homes and Gardens, Conran Octopus, Dorling Kindersley, Dover Publications, Editions Renyi Inc, Elan Press, Exile Editions, Friedman/Fairfax Publishing, Globe Pequot Press, Grove Press, Harvill Press, Headline Book Publishing, Hodder & Stoughton, Judy Piatkus Publishers, Key Porter Multimedia, Masters Press, Meadowbrook Press, Ministry of Transportation, Ontario, Newmarket Press, Running Press, Soho Press, Stewart Tabori & Chang, Virgin Publishing, W H Freeman and Company, and Watson-Guptill Publications.
