= Harry Smith (runner) =

American long-distance runner

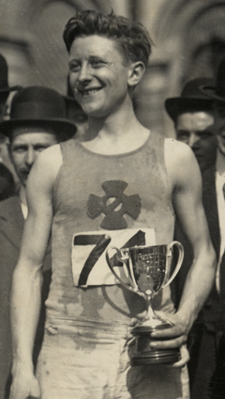
- Smith in 1911, holding a trophy.

Personal information
- Born: Harry James Smith; July 30, 1888 The Bronx, New York, U.S.
- Died: November 20, 1962 (aged 74) Mitchell, Indiana, U.S.
- Height: 5 ft 11 in (1.80 m)

Sport
- Sport: Long-distance running
- Event: Marathon
- Club: Pastime Athletic Club

Harry James Smith (Irish: Éibhear Séamas Mac Gabhann; July 30, 1888 – November 20, 1962) was an Irish-American long-distance runner. He was most notable for competing in the 1912 Olympics in Stockholm. He was also the father of Hart wrestling family matriarch Helen Hart and the father-in-law of Stu Hart.

== Early life ==
He was born in the Bronx, New York City, and was of Irish descent. Smith came from a relatively well off family and had a brother named Frank. Both of them suffered from bipolar disorder.

His athletic interest began when he was a child. At the age of 12 Smith was playing craps with some friends in an alley when a police officer spotted them and ran after them, attempting to arrest them for illegal gambling. The man caught all of them except Smith. Another day when the officer found Smith, the officer advised him to pursue competitive running.

== Career ==
Smith competed in the marathon for the United States at the 1912 Summer Olympics. He finished in 17th place. He shared rooms with Jim Thorpe on the way to the Olympics. Smith also ran the Boston Marathon 10 years in a row. He finished 10th at the 1912 event with a time of 2:27:46. He finished in the top three at the 1913 event. Smith also participated in at least three Run for the Diamonds events. Harry came in at third place in both 1911 and 1913. He came first and won in 1912. Smith was USA Outdoor Track & Field Champion 10000 m in 1912, a victory he shared with Hannes Kolehmainen. Later in 1912 Smith won a race called the Union Settlement Road Race and was given a gold medal award, handed to him by congressman Amos Pinchot. He won the Coney Island Derby Race in 1913.

Smith refrained from competing in the fall of 1914 due to sore feet. While in training Smith had a diet that had him consume little water and instead eat a lot of vegetables. He was of the belief that a marathon runner should never look behind themself, as this throws off one's timing while running. He made an exception to this however when he once encountered Tom Longboat while in a race and exchanged a glance with him. This later became a story he would tell his five daughters. Smith was a member and Captain of the Pastime Athletic Club. Supposedly Smith was an early underground sports agent. After his athletic career ended he became a sports columnist for The New York Tribune.

== Personal life ==
He was married to a Greek woman named Elizabeth "Ellie" Poulis (Greek: Ελισάβετ Πούλη). Ellie's parents were from the town of Missolonghi, Aetolia-Acarnania. She was born on Ellis Island while her parents were in quarantine and waiting to be granted entry into the United States. Ellie was a dancer and artist in her younger years. Harry and Ellie were the parents of five girls, Helen, Diana, Patricia "Patsy", Elizabeth "Betty" and Joanie.

Some time during the 1930s he was the victim of a hit-and-run accident which left him with permanent injury on one of his legs, he was bedridden for a long time and walked with a limp for the rest of his life. This left the family in financial troubles. He and his wife helped raise their daughter, Helen Hart's oldest son Smith when she and her husband, Stu, suffered an automobile accident while she was pregnant with their second child, Bruce. His daughter Diana married Jock Osler descendant of Sir William Osler and his daughter Patsy married a man named Jack Forrest, who was the great great grandnephew of Nathan Bedford Forrest. he died in Mitchell Indiana in 1962 of a cerebral haemorrhage at age 74

== Legacy ==
His granddaughter Diana Hart dedicated the fourth chapter, "Roots", in her book Under the Mat to discussing Smith's life. She also named her son Harry. The younger Harry is a professional wrestler.

== See also ==
- List of people with bipolar disorder
