= In the Pit with Piper =

2002 autobiography of Rowdy Roddy Piper

In the Pit With Piper: Roddy Gets Rowdy
- Author: Roderick George Toombs and Robert Picarello
- Language: English
- Subject: Wrestling
- Genre: Autobiography
- Publisher: Berkley Publishing Group
- Publication date: November 5, 2002
- Publication place: Canada
- Media type: Hardcover and paperback
- Pages: 256
- ISBN: 978-0425187210

In the Pit With Piper: Roddy Gets Rowdy is a 2002 autobiography of Canadian professional wrestler Rowdy Roddy Piper (real name Roderick Toombs). It was co-written by Toombs and Robert Picarello. The book became a bestseller upon its release and was well received by critics and fans. The foreword was written by Toombs' cousin and fellow wrestler Bret Hart.

== Background ==
Toombs had originally intended to write a book named If You're Going To Die Kid, Die In The Ring. The publishing company wanted Toombs to be very harsh on promoter Vince McMahon. Toombs promoted the book a lot during his wrestling career.

== Content ==
The book is dedicated to many of Toombs' closest friends in the wrestling industry who had died at the time of the publishing: Owen Hart, Rick Rude, Dino Bravo, Brian Pillman, Jay "The Alaskan" York, Kerry Von Erich, David Von Erich, Mike Von Erich, Chris Von Erich, Andre The Giant, Art Barr, Johnny Valentine, Rick McGraw, Gorilla Monsoon, Wahoo McDaniel, Davey Boy Smith and Lou Thesz.

== Release and reception ==
Dave Meltzer reviewed the book for the Wrestling Observer Newsletter.

== See also ==
- Bret "Hitman" Hart – The Best There Is, The Best There Was, The Best There Ever Will Be, autobiography by Hart with a foreword by Toombs
