= Al Oeming – Man of the North =

Canadian television series

- Directed by: Jack Kaufman; Dennis Saunders
- Presented by: Al Oeming; Leslie Nielsen
- Country of origin: Canada
- Original language: English
- No. of seasons: 1
- No. of episodes: 13

Production
- Running time: 30 minutes

Original release
- Network: CBC Television
- Release: 29 March – 26 April 1980

Al Oeming – Man of the North is a Canadian nature documentary television series which aired on CBC Television in 1980 which was hosted by conservationist Al Oeming.

== Premise ==
Al Oeming, a wildlife conservationist and zoologist of the Alberta Game Farm, hosted this series with Leslie Nielsen. The series follows Oeming from the prairies to the high arctic as he tries to trap rare animals and endangered species for preservation at his Alberta Game Farm.

== Production ==
The series was produced by Nielsen-Ferns and Jack Kaufman, Ltd.

The films were shot in 1976 and released in 1977, but first aired on television on CBC in 1980.

== Scheduling ==
The 13-episode half-hour series aired on Saturdays at 7:00 p.m. (Eastern) from 29 March to 26 April 1980.
