= Ruffy Silverstein (Canadian wrestler) =

Canadian professional wrestler (born 1972)

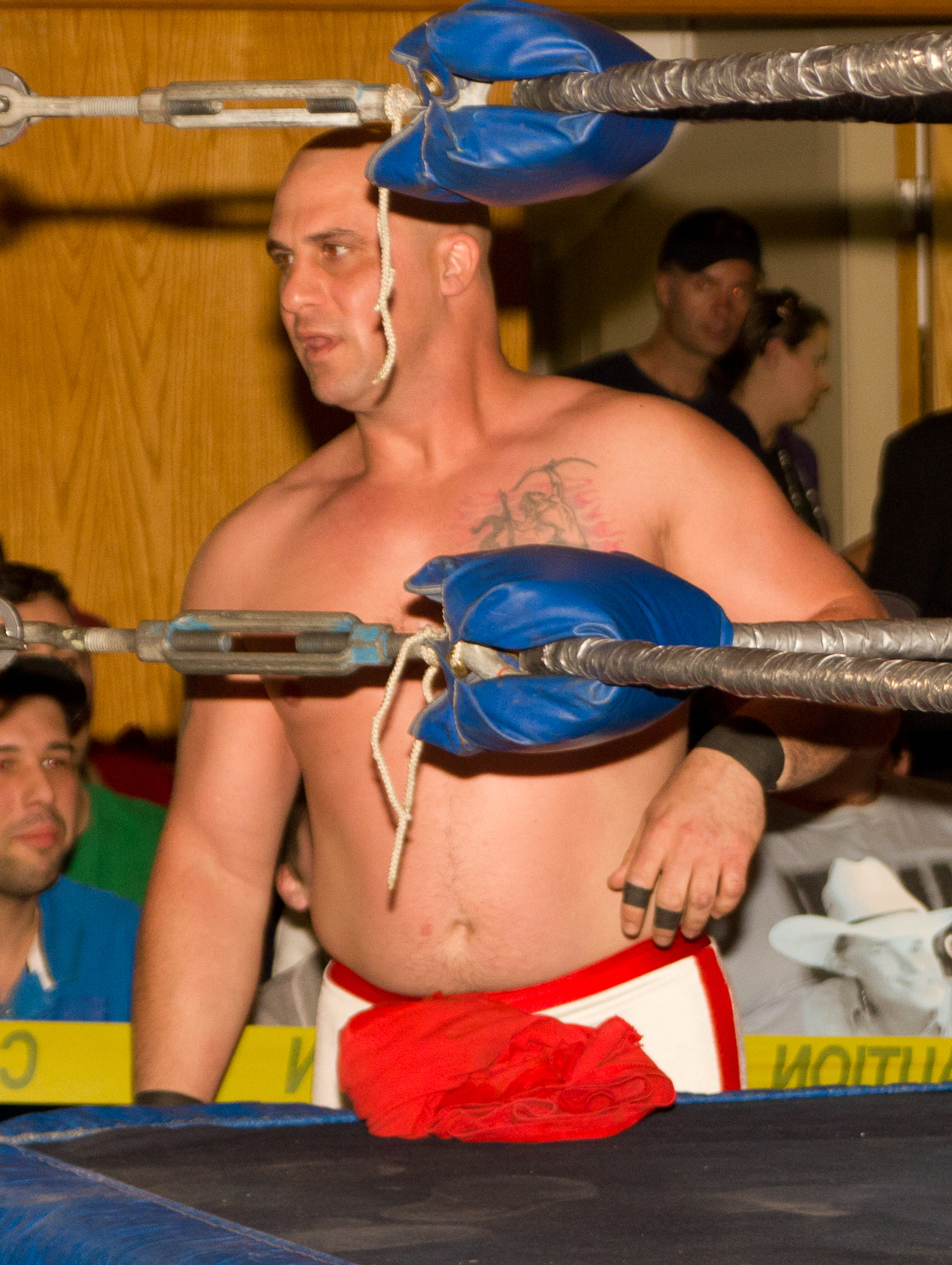
- Silverstein in May 2012

Personal information
- Born: Aaron Quinn Schlosser; November 30, 1972 (age 53) Toronto, Ontario, Canada

Professional wrestling career
- Ring name: Ruffy Silverstein
- Billed height: 5 ft 10 in (1.78 m)
- Billed weight: 228 lb (103 kg)
- Billed from: Calgary, Alberta
- Trained by: Stu Hart; Bruce Hart
- Debut: 1998

Aaron Quinn Schlosser (born November 30, 1972) is a Canadian professional wrestler, better known by his ring name, Ruffy Silverstein. He wrestles on the independent circuit in Canada and the northern United States.

== Professional wrestling career ==
Schlosser trained under the Hart family in Calgary and debuted in 1998 as "Ruffy Silverstein", facing The Cuban Assassin in Red Deer, Alberta. His wrestling name was given to him by Stu because Aaron reminded him of a wrestler from Stu's day named Ralph "Ruffy" Silverstein. He wrestled for the Hart family-owned Stampede Wrestling promotion for a year and a half. He later joined the Windsor, Ontario-based Border City Wrestling promotion. Schlosser also spent time as the Canadian champion in the CIWA (Canadian Independent Wrestling Alliance). Also wrestled for PWE, GLCW, CWA, CPW, XWC, OPW, CWI, GCPW, Big Time wrestling, GCW, CWE, PWA, and many other independent wrestling promotions.

Silverstein was a member of Team Canada in Total Nonstop Action Wrestling between October 5, 2004 and November 7, 2004. He teamed with Bobby Roode and Eric Young on the October 8, 2004 episode of TNA Xplosion and the October 22, 2004 episode of TNA Impact!, losing on both occasions.

Silverstein has had several WWE dark matches. In 2004 he wrestled Scott Steiner on a Sunday night heat taping. He also wrestled a dark match against Carlito in 2004. Most notable was when he teamed with Johnny Devine (wrestling as "J.P. Parsons") on the August 18, 2005 episode of WWE SmackDown!, losing to Road Warrior Animal and Heidenreich in a squash match. In 2007 he wrestled in a dark match (teaming with Lance Malibu, in a losing effort), against The Highlanders.

Ruffy currently helps train at the Figure Four Wrestling Academy in Bradford, Ontario alongside longtime friend "Cold Blooded" Chris Garvin. Notable graduates from the school include Mike Hart (grandson of Stu Hart and son of Smith Hart), RJ City and Jodi D'Milo.

== Championships and accomplishments ==
- Busted Knuckle Pro Wrestling
  - BKPW Heavyweight Championship (1 time)
- Canadian Independent Wrestling Alliance/ Canadian Wrestling Entertainment
  - CIWA/CWE Heavyweight Championship (6 times)
  - CWE Tag Team Championship (1 time) - with Reggie Marley
- Fighting Spirit Pro Wrestling / Neo Spirit Pro Wrestling
  - F/NSPW Tag Team Championship (3 times) – with Marco Malaquias
- Great Lakes Championship Wrestling
  - GLCW Canadian Heavyweight Championship (1 time)
  - GLCW Tag Team Championship (1 time) – with Marco Malaquias
- Living Legends Wrestling
  - LLW Heavyweight Championship (1 time)
- Pure Wrestling Association
  - PWA Ontario Championship (1 time)
  - PWA Pure Wrestling Championship (5 times)
  - PWA Tag Team Championship (1 time) - with Juan Oritz
- Other titles
  - PWE Cruiserweight Championship (1 time)
