= ECW Press =

Canadian book publisher

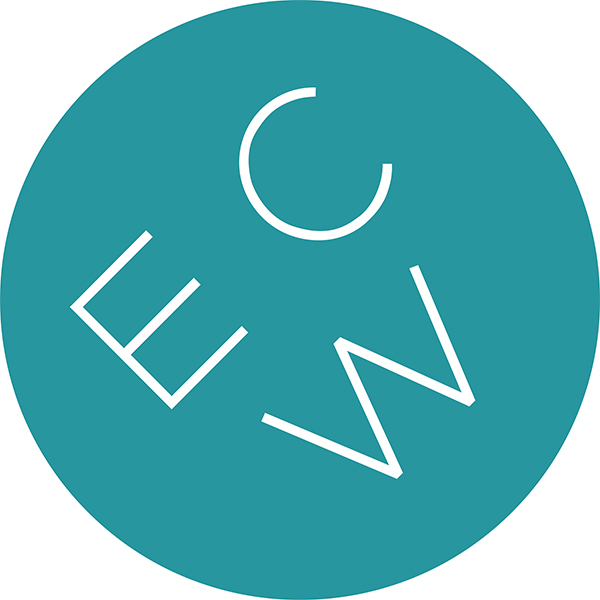
- Founded: 1974
- Founder: Jack David and Robert Lecker
- Country of origin: Canada
- Headquarters location: Toronto
- Distribution: Jaguar Book Group (Canada); Simon & Schuster(USA); Turnaround Publisher Services Ltd.(UK & Europe); New South Books (Australia & New Zealand)
- Publication types: Books
- Imprints: Bespeak Audio
- Owners: Jack David and David Caron
- No. of employees: 11–50
- Official website: ecwpress.com

ECW Press is a Canadian book publisher located in Toronto, Ontario. It was founded by Jack David and Robert Lecker in 1974 as a Canadian literary magazine named Essays on Canadian Writing. They started publishing trade and scholarly books in 1979.

ECW Press publishes a range of books in fiction, non-fiction, poetry, sport, and pop culture. In 2015, Publishers Weekly listed ECW Press as one of the fastest-growing independent publishers in North America.

== History ==
The company was founded by Jack David and Robert Lecker in 1974 as a Canadian literary magazine named Essays on Canadian Writing. Five years later, ECW published its first books—trade and scholarly titles. It started with two principal series: the Annotated Bibliography of Canada's Major Authors (ABCMA) and Canadian Writers and Their Works (CWTW). Through the 1980s, ECW upgraded its typesetting facilities, published reference titles and began to service third-party clients, creating books for corporations to use for promotional purposes and events such as anniversaries.

In the 1990s, ECW re-commenced trade publishing and expanded its scholarly and reference lines for high school and public libraries. They started publishing a mix of commercial books alongside their literary books, such as pop culture books (the first being The Duchovny Files: The Truth Is in Here by Paul Mitchell, published in 1995, a biographical dossier on actor David Duchovny that includes episode guides of The X-Files), sports books, and genre fiction.

Robert Lecker left the company in 2003.

ECW produced its first audiobook in 2009 and expanded its operations in 2015. ECW launched the audiobook imprint Bespeak Audio, focusing on Canadian production of Canadian books, in 2017.

== Titles ==
=== Fiction ===
- Steve Stanton, Reconciliation, Retribution, Redemption, Freenet
- Heather Tucker, The Clay Girl
- Jen Sookfong Lee, The Conjoined
- Anne Emery, Cecilian Vespers, The Sign of the Cross, Obit, Ruined Abbey, Death at Christy Burke's, Lament for Bonnie, Children in the Morning, and Barrington Street Blues
- Joey Comeau, Overqualified
- Cordelia Strube, On the Shores of Darkness, There Is Light
- John McFetridge, Dirty Sweet: A Mystery, Everybody Knows This is Nowhere, Swap: A Mystery, Tumblin' dice
- Kevin J. Anderson, Clockwork Lives (with Neil Peart), Clockwork Angels (with Neil Peart), editor of 2113: Stories Inspired by the Music of Rush
- Amanda Leduc, The Miracles of Ordinary Men
- Randal Graham, Beforelife, Afterlife Crisis, and Nether Regions.
- Andrew F. Sullivan, The Marigold

=== Non-fiction ===
- Neil Peart, Ghost Rider: Travels on the Healing Road, Roadshow, Far and Away, Far and Near, Far and Wide
- Darcy McKeough, The Duke of Kent
- Maude Barlow, Boiling Point
- George Bowering, The Hockey Scribbler
- Barry Avrich, Moguls, Monsters and Madmen
- Geri Jewell, I'm Walking as Straight as I Can
- Liisa Ladouceur, Encyclopedia Gothica
- Liisa Ladouceur, How to Kill a Vampire: Fangs in Folklore, Film and Fiction
- Emm Gryner, The Healing Power of Singing: Raise Your Voice, Change Your Life (What Touring with David Bowie, Single Parenting and Ditching the Music Business Taught Me in 25 Easy Steps)
- Christopher Labos, Does Coffee Cause Cancer?
- Lenore Newman, Lost Feast: Culinary Extinction and the Future of Food
- Lenore Newman and Evan D.G. Fraser, Dinner on Mars: The Technologies That Will Feed the Red Planet and Transform Agriculture on Earth

=== Poetry ===
- Marilyn Dumont, The Pemmican Eaters
- Judith Fitzgerald, River
- Ashley-Elizabeth Best, Slow States of Collapse
- Robert Priest, Reading the Bible Backwards
- Jamie Sharpe, Cut-up Apologetic
- Patrick Woodcock, You can't bury them all
- George Murray, Whiteout, Glimpse, Diversion
- Emily Schultz, Songs for the Dancing Chicken
- R. M. Vaughan, Ruined Stars
- Paul Vermeersch, The Fat Kid
- Hawksley Workman, Hawksley Burns for Isadora
- Gillian Sze, Quiet Night Think

=== Sports ===
- Tim Hornbaker, National Wrestling Alliance, The Untold Story of the Monopoly that Strangled Pro Wrestling, Capitol Revolution,
- Yvonne Bambrick, The Urban Cycling Survival Guide
- Val James, Black Ice
- Red Kelly, The Red Kelly Story
- Pat Patterson, Accepted
- Dennis Hull, The Third Best Hull
- Bruce Hart, Straight from the Hart
- Heath McCoy, Pain and Passion: The History of Stampede Wrestling
- Marsha Erb, Stu Hart: Lord of the Ring
- Greg Prato, Sack Exchange
- Bryan Alvarez & R.D. Reynolds, The Death of WCW: 10th Anniversary Edition
- Dylan "Hornswoggle" Postl, Life Is Short & So Am I

=== Pop Culture ===
- Lindsay Gibb, National Treasure
- Crissy Calhoun, Love You To Death, Spotted: your one and only unofficial guide to Gossip Girl
- Jesse McLean, Wait For It
- Graeme Burk and Robert Smith?, Who's 50, Who Is The Doctor, The Doctors Are In
- Greg Renoff, Van Halen Rising
