= The Hart Dynasty =

Professional wrestling stable

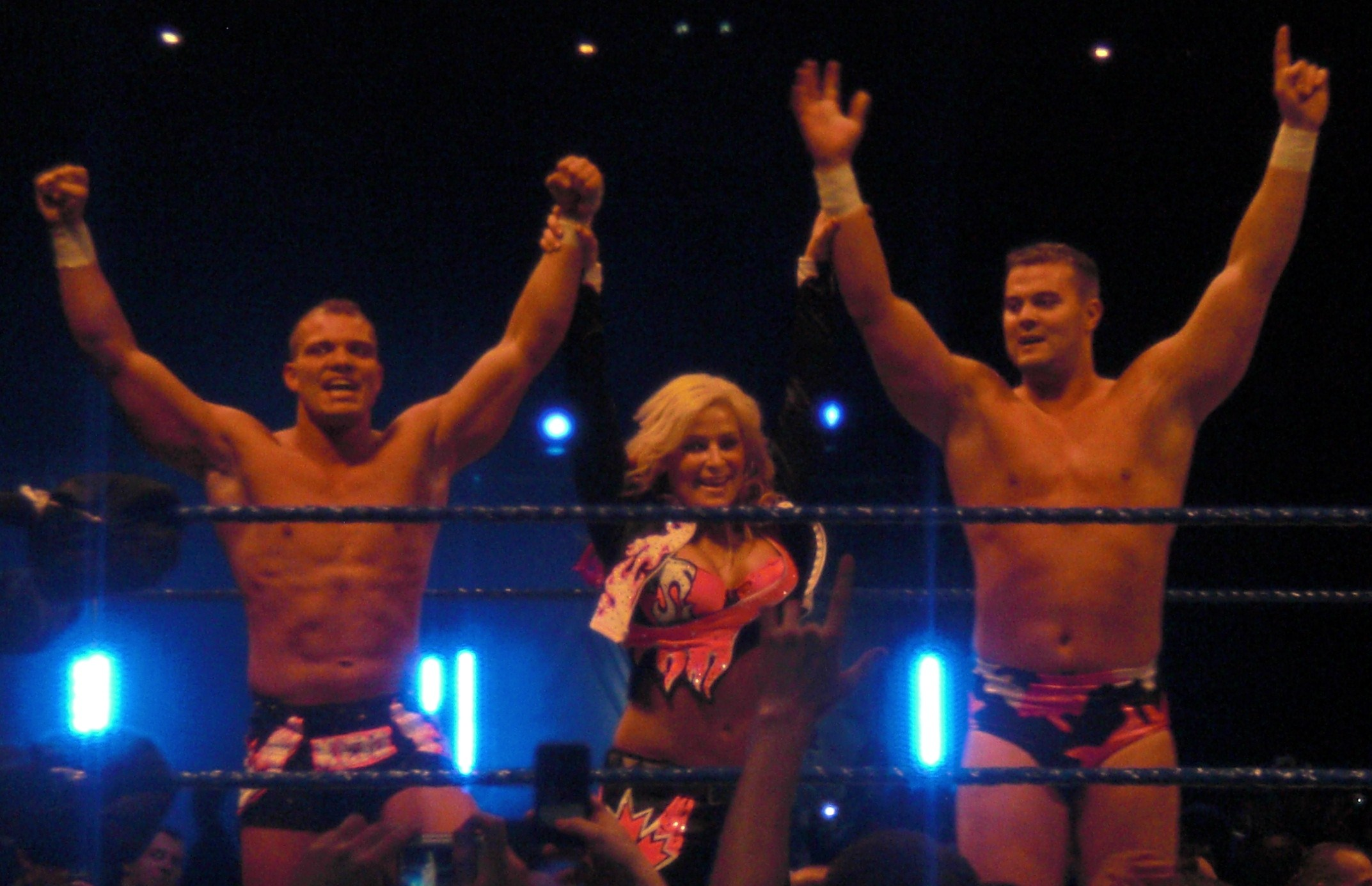
- The Hart Dynasty (left to right): Tyson Kidd, Natalya, and David Hart Smith

Stable
- Members: Harry Smith / DH Smith / David Hart Smith; TJ Wilson / Tyson Kidd; Nattie Neidhart / Natalya Neidhart; Bret Hart
- Name(s): The Hart Dynasty; Hart Trilogy; New Hart Foundation; Next Generation Hart Foundation; Stampede Bulldogs
- Debut: 2002, June 26, 2007 (WWE-FCW)
- Disbanded: November 15, 2010
- Years active: 2002–2010

The Hart Dynasty was a Canadian professional wrestling stable who appeared in World Wrestling Entertainment (WWE). The unit consisted of the tag team of Tyson Kidd and David Hart Smith, and Natalya as a manager. The group was named due to the connection of all three wrestlers to the Hart wrestling family; David Hart Smith is the son of Davey Boy Smith, Natalya is the daughter of Jim Neidhart, and Tyson Kidd trained under Bret Hart and at Stu Hart's Dungeon and would later marry Natalya. They are recognized as the final team to hold WWE's original World Tag Team Championship.

== History ==
=== Early years (2002–2007) ===
They first teamed together for Stampede Wrestling in Calgary on February 22, 2002, when they fought in a draw against Apocalypse and Dave Swift. Later on, they were called The Stampede Bulldogs in the independents in Western Canada and the United States. They won the Grapple Cup Tournament on November 27, 2005 for AWA Pinnacle in Pacific, Washington, after defeating Rollin 2 Deep (Cadillac Caliss and The Wildcard).

=== Florida Championship Wrestling (2007–2008) ===
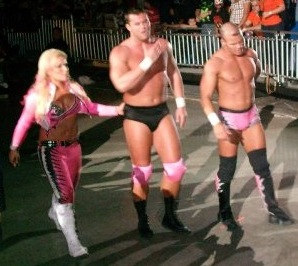
The Hart Dynasty (from left to right): Natalya, David Hart Smith, and Tyson Kidd

In 2007, World Wrestling Entertainment (WWE) launched their new development territory, Florida Championship Wrestling (FCW). Harry Smith, Nattie Neidhart and TJ Wilson were moved to the new farm territory, where they aligned themselves and formed the Next/New Generation Hart Foundation (also known simply The New Hart Foundation) and were later joined by Teddy Hart and Ted DiBiase Jr. At FCW's debut show on June 26, Smith won a 21-man battle royal to become the promotion's first Southern Heavyweight Champion. Plans to bring the stable to WWE's main roster were made but Teddy Hart was released from his development contract in October. Eventually, DiBiase, Neidhart, and Smith, after losing the Southern Heavyweight Championship, were all called up to the main roster, albeit on separate shows, as DiBiase and Smith (using the name DH Smith) were sent to Raw and Neidhart to SmackDown, disbanding the Next Generation Hart Foundation.

After being drafted to SmackDown, Smith returned to FCW — without debuting on SmackDown — and reformed the stable with Wilson. With Neidhart's (renamed Natalya) help them win the FCW Florida Tag Team Championship on October 30, 2008, by defeating Joe Hennig and Heath Slater. They held the championship until December 11, when they lost to Johnny Curtis and Tyler Reks. After losing the championship, they were once again split up when Wilson (renamed Tyson Kidd) was called up to the ECW brand with Natalya as his valet.

=== ECW (2009) ===
In the 2009 WWE Supplemental Draft, Natalya and Smith were officially drafted to the ECW brand, despite Smith never debuting for SmackDown. On the May 12 episode of ECW on Sci Fi, Smith debuted on ECW under the name David Hart Smith, by interfering in Kidd's match against Finlay, signaling the reformation of the group, briefly under the name The Hart Trilogy, before settling on The Hart Dynasty. Smith made his debut with the group by defeating Finlay the following week. The team had their first match together, alongside Jack Swagger, by defeating fellow Canadian Christian and Tommy Dreamer in a handicap match on May 26. They made their first appearance as just a tag team on the June 9 episode of ECW by defeating Christian and Swagger.

=== Last Unified Tag Team Champions (2009–2010) ===
On June 29, the trio were traded to the SmackDown brand and debuted as a team for the brand on the July 3 episode of SmackDown, when Kidd and Smith lost to Cryme Tyme. The Hart Dynasty made their pay-per-view debut at Bragging Rights in a 14-man tag team match in which their team was successful in winning. They also had their first match for the Unified WWE Tag Team Championship against D-Generation X (DX) on the December 25 episode of SmackDown, but lost.

On March 28, 2010, The Hart Dynasty, (along with the rest of the Hart family), were in their uncle Bret's corner as he faced Mr. McMahon in a No Holds Barred match at WrestleMania XXVI, performing a Hart Attack on McMahon during the match and officially becoming fan favorites as a result. The following night on Raw, The Hart Dynasty defeated the Unified WWE Tag Team Champions ShoMiz (The Miz and Big Show) in a non-title match, after ShoMiz had insulted Hart.

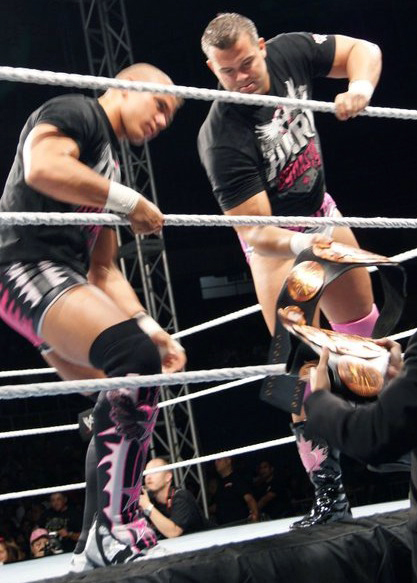
The Hart Dynasty as WWE Tag Team Champions in 2010

At Extreme Rules, they earned a shot at the Unified Tag Team Championship after defeating ShoMiz as part of a tag team gauntlet match (which also included the team of John Morrison and R-Truth and the team of Montel Vontavious Porter and Mark Henry). On the April 26 episode of Raw, The Hart Dynasty defeated ShoMiz to win the Unified Tag Team Championship. The following day, all three members were officially drafted to the Raw brand in the 2010 WWE Supplemental Draft. On May 10, Kidd defeated The Miz in a match which earned any member of The Hart Dynasty a match for The Miz's WWE United States Championship. The Miz was allowed to pick his opponent for the championship match, and he chose to face Bret Hart. On the following episode of Raw on May 17, Hart defeated The Miz to win his fifth United States Championship, with help from the other members of The Hart Dynasty, who prevented Chris Jericho, William Regal, and Vladimir Kozlov from interfering on The Miz's behalf. At the Over the Limit pay-per-view, The Hart Dynasty defeated The Miz and Chris Jericho to retain the championship.

On May 24, 2010, Hart was named as the Raw General Manager and vacated the United States Championship as a result. On the same episode of Raw, The Hart Dynasty began a rivalry with a group composed of Jimmy Uso and Jey Uso, the sons of Rikishi, and Tamina, the daughter of Jimmy "Superfly" Snuka. This led to a non-title six-person mixed tag team match at the Fatal 4-Way pay per view, where Natalya pinned Tamina to win the match. The following night on Raw, Hart was fired as general manager. The following month at the Money in the Bank pay-per-view, The Hart Dynasty and The Usos competed in a tag team match for the Unified Tag Team Championship, which Kidd and Smith won to retain the championship.

On the August 16 episode of Raw, the World Tag Team Championship was retired, making the Hart Dynasty the final champions. On the same night, Bret Hart presented The Hart Dynasty with brand new WWE Tag Team Championship belts.

=== Dissolution (2010) ===
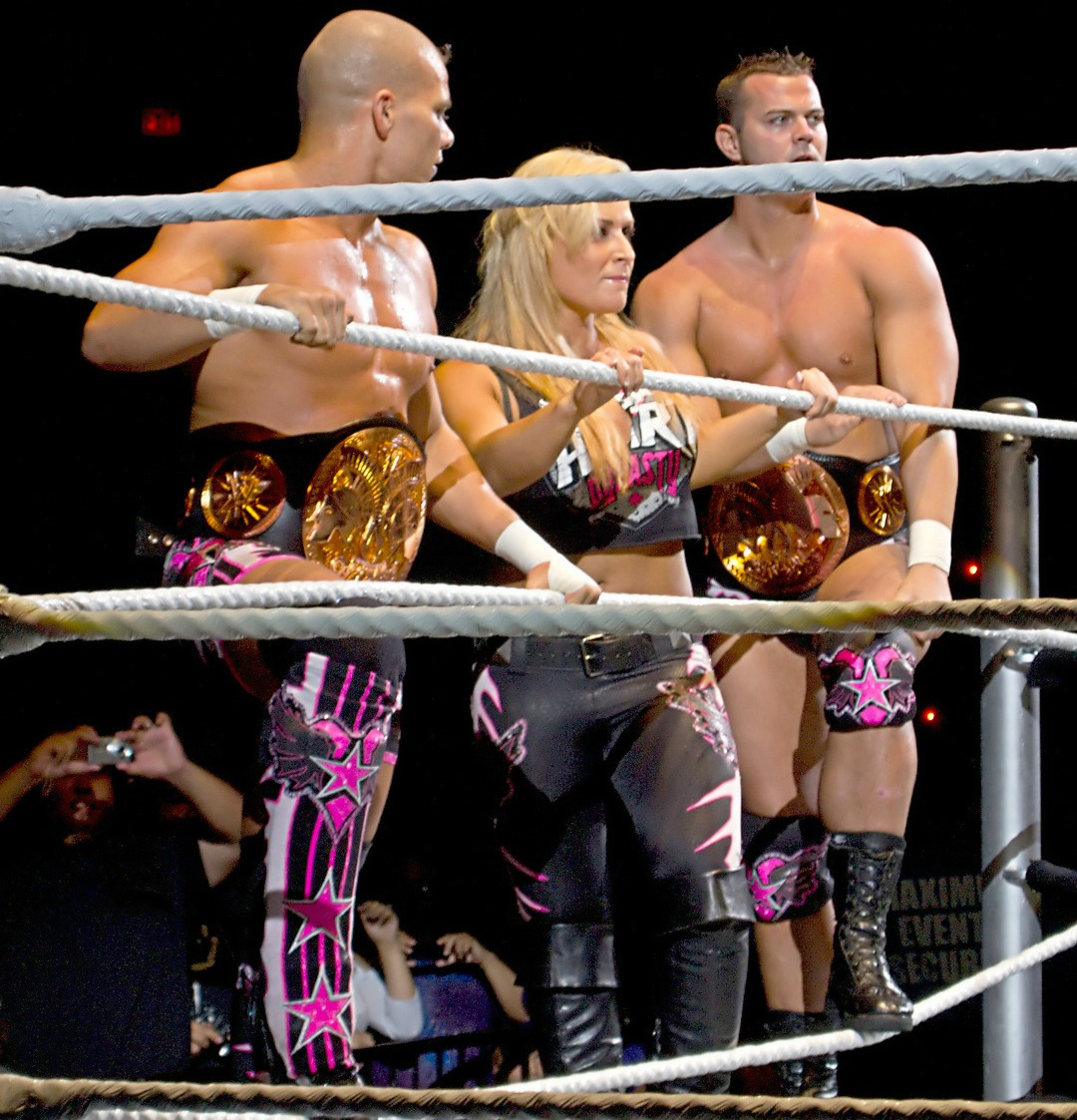
The Hart Dynasty (with Natalya) as WWE Tag Team Champions

At Night of Champions, The Hart Dynasty lost the WWE Tag Team Championship to Cody Rhodes and Drew McIntyre in a Tag Team Turmoil match which also involved the Usos, Kozlov and Santino Marella, and the team of Evan Bourne and Mark Henry. After a failed attempt to regain the championship, in which Kidd was pushed off balance during their double-team Hart Attack move, Kidd and Smith began to have a falling out with one another.

This culminated on the November 15 episode of Raw, when Kidd refused to tag in and attacked Smith during a match for the WWE Tag Team Championship against The Nexus (Justin Gabriel and Heath Slater). Kidd became a heel once again as a result of this. Smith defeated Kidd in a singles match on the November 25 episode of WWE Superstars. Afterward, Smith offered to shake Kidd's hand, but Kidd refused and instead slapped him across the face. On the following episode of Raw, Kidd defeated Smith in a rematch.

In 2017, Tyson Kidd announced that he had retired from professional wrestling due to a spinal cord injury, therefore removing any chances of a reunion.

== Championships and accomplishments ==
- Florida Championship Wrestling
  - FCW Southern Heavyweight Championship (2 times) – Harry Smith (1), TJ Wilson (1)
  - FCW Florida Tag Team Championship (1 time) – DH Smith and TJ Wilson
- World Wrestling Entertainment
  - WWE United States Championship (1 time) – Bret Hart
  - World Tag Team Championship (1 time, final) (Note: Smith and Kidd held the World Tag Team and WWE Tag Team Championships when the titles were unified under the umbrella term "Unified WWE Tag Team Championships". Midway through their reign, the World Tag Team Championships were retired in favor of continuing the lineage of the WWE Tag Team Championship and were presented with new belts to represent the titles.) – David Hart Smith and Tyson Kidd
  - WWE Tag Team Championship (1 time) – David Hart Smith and Tyson Kidd
  - ** Bragging Rights Trophy (2009) - David Hart Smith and Tyson Kidd – with Team SmackDown (Chris Jericho, Kane, Matt Hardy, Finlay, and R-Truth)

== See also ==
- Hart wrestling family
