= Allan J. Stitt =

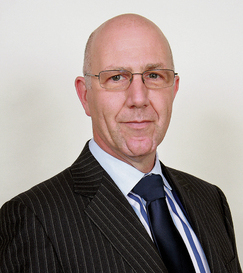
- Born: October 11, 1961 (age 63); Toronto, Ontario, Canada
- Education: B.Com., LL.B., LL.M.
- Alma mater: Harvard Law School; University of Toronto; University of Windsor Faculty of Law; University of Detroit Mercy School of Law.
- Occupation(s): Arbitrator, mediator, negotiator, film producer
- Website: adrchambers.com /Allan J. Stitt

Allan Jeffrey Stitt (born 11 October 1961) is a chartered Canadian arbitrator, mediator and film producer. He is the president and CEO of ADR Chambers, a Canadian arbitration and mediation organization. Stitt is the recipient of the 2006 Ontario Bar Association Award of Excellence in Alternative Dispute Resolution. In 2022, Stitt was awarded an honorary Doctor of Laws from the University of Windsor Faculty of Law. As a movie executive producer, Stitt has also contributed to films including The Layover, The Birth of a Nation, Into the Forest, I Saw the Light, and Ithaca.

== Life ==
Stitt lives in Toronto, Canada. His hobbies include playing tennis and collecting sports contracts, historical documents and memorabilia. Stitt donated his notable "Allan Stitt Collection" of hockey artifacts to the Hockey Hall of Fame in Toronto, Canada. His passion for the Toronto Maple Leaf Hockey Club and hockey documents generally have been the subject of two books by Greg Oliver.

== Education ==
Stitt earned a Bachelor's degree of Commerce and Finance at the University of Toronto, a Bachelor of Laws at the University of Windsor Faculty of Law and a Juris Doctor at the University of Detroit Mercy School of Law. Then, he earned a Master of Laws degree at Harvard Law School where he studied Negotiation and ADR in 1992.

== Career ==
During his career, Stitt has mediated disputes in several contexts including commercial, employment, corporate governance, workplace, financial industry, personal injury, sports, and breach of contract. He also has arbitrated numerous commercial cases including the National Transportation Agency and the Ontario Farm Products Marketing Board.

=== Memberships ===
Stitt has been appointed by the Canadian Department of Justice as advisor at the UNCITRAL working group for the enforcement of international mediation agreements. He is a senior advisor to the Jerusalem Arbitration Centre in relation to Israeli and Palestinian businesses. Stitt is a member of the Toronto mediation committee for the Ontario Mandatory Mediation Program, a distinguished fellow of the International Academy of Mediators, a former president of the ADR Institute of Canada, the Arbitration and Mediation Institute of Canada and chair of the board of the Sport Dispute Resolution Centre of Canada (SDRCC). He is an International Mediation Institute certified mediator, and an arbitrator on the Canadian Transportation Agency List of Arbitrators. He is also a member of the International Panel of Mediators with the Singapore Mediation Centre. and a collaborator with the Australian Center for Conflict Resolution. Stitt is also on the international panel of arbitrators for the International Centre for Dispute Resolution.

=== Academic activities ===
Stitt has taught ADR and negotiation in North America, Europe, Asia, Africa and Australia. For example, he has been an adjunct professor at the University of Toronto Law School and a special lecturer at the University of Windsor Faculty of Law.

== Publications ==
Books published by Stitt on ADR systems design includes Alternative Dispute Resolution for Organizations, Mediating Commercial Disputes, and Mediation: A Practical Guide. He is co-author of LexisNexis ADR Practice Manual.

== Filmography ==
Stitt has been executive producer of a number of films in 2015 and 2016.

Year	Title	Role
2016	Drunk Parents	Executive producer (post-production)
2016	Phil	Executive producer (post-production)
2016	The Layover	Executive producer (post-production)
2016	Henchmen	Executive producer (filming)
2016	The Addition	Executive producer
2016	The Birth of a Nation	Executive producer
2015	Ithaca	Executive producer
2015	Into the Forest	Executive producer
2015	I Saw the Light	Associate producer
2015	The Driftless Area	Executive producer
2015	Meadowland	Executive producer
2005	Move or Die (Note: Newgrounds video game)	Executive producer
