= Paul LeDuc (wrestler) =

Canadian wrestler (1936–2026)

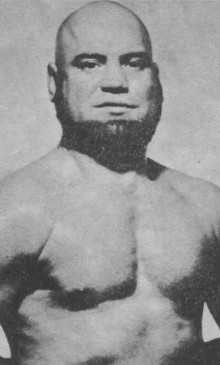
- LeDuc c. 1972

Personal information
- Born: Joseph Léodard Mimeault; November 10, 1936 Saint-Maxime-du-Mont-Louis, Quebec, Canada
- Died: August 30, 2026 (aged 89) Montreal, Quebec, Canada
- Children: Carl LeDuc

Professional wrestling career
- Billed height: 5 ft 10 in (178 cm)
- Billed weight: 196 lb (89 kg)
- Debut: 1957
- Retired: 1978

Paul LeDuc (born Joseph Léodard Mimeault; November 10, 1936 – August 30, 2026) was a Canadian professional wrestler. He was best known for teaming with his kayfabe (storyline) brother Jos LeDuc.

== Professional wrestling career ==
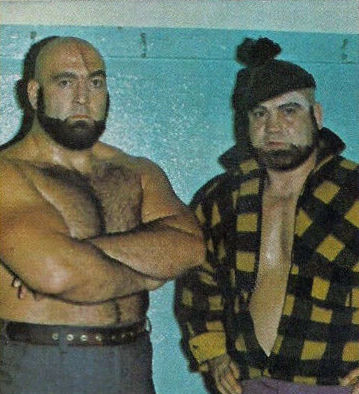
Paul and Jos LeDuc in January 1973

LeDuc was born as Joseph Léodard Mimeault on November 10, 1936 Saint-Maxime-du-Mont-Louis on the Gaspé peninsula of Québec, one of 15 children born to Edmond and Hortense (née Lemieux) Mimeault. Both of his parents died by the time he was 13, and he grew up in foster care before being raised by his siblings. Also playing hockey in his youth, LeDuc started wrestling at age 18. Despite his short stature, he decided to turn professional in 1957 and began his training in Montreal, and later moved to Mexico for further instruction. Earlier in his career, he wrestled under the name Del Leo Mimolt.

He talked a friend, Michel Pigeon, into becoming a wrestler as well. Pigeon agreed and took on the ring name Jos LeDuc, as the pair pretended to be brothers. They first worked together in Stu Hart's Stampede Wrestling promotion in Calgary, Alberta. The LeDucs used a lumberjack gimmick to honour deceased professional wrestler "Yukon" Eric Holmback. While wrestling in Stampede Wrestling, the pair held the Stampede International Tag Team Championship.

The LeDucs next moved back to Montreal. They feuded with the Rougeau wrestling family as well as the Vachon brothers (Maurice and Paul). During a wrestling show in Montreal, Paul LeDuc was legitimately married in the wrestling ring. They also held the Grand Prix Wrestling Tag Team Championship twice in 1972 and 1973.

The LeDucs also wrestled in Florida, where they were known as the Canadian Lumberjacks. In December 1973, they defeated Dusty Rhodes and Dick Slater to win the NWA Florida Tag Team Championship. He legally changed his name to Paul LeDuc in 1977.

== Retirement ==
LeDuc retired from wrestling in 1978 and began working for Quebecor, a communications company, the following year. He later accepted a position writing about professional wrestling for Canadian Online Explorer.

His long-time friend and tag team partner, Jos LeDuc, died in 1999. The pair had played the role of brothers so well that, when it was revealed that they were not related, the news was widely discussed on talk shows in Quebec.

== Personal life and death ==
LeDuc married Pierrette Brault in a public ceremony coinciding with a wrestling event at the Montreal Forum in December 1971. They had two sons and a daughter; LeDuc's son, Carl, is also a professional wrestler. His wife, Pierrette, died in 2011.

LeDuc died in Montreal due to cardiorenal syndrome on August 30, 2026, at the age of 89.

== Championships and accomplishments ==
- Championship Wrestling from Florida
  - NWA Florida Tag Team Championship (1 time) - with Jos LeDuc
- Grand Prix Wrestling (Montreal)
  - Grand Prix Tag Team Championship (2 times) - with Jos LeDuc
- Stampede Wrestling
  - NWA International Tag Team Championship (Calgary version) (1 time) - with Jos LeDuc
