= A Lion's Tale =

1999 book by Chris Jericho

A Lion's Tale: Around the World in Spandex
- Author: Chris Jericho; Peter Thomas Fornatale
- Language: English
- Genre: Autobiography
- Publisher: Grand Central Publishing
- Publication date: October 25, 2007
- Publication place: United States
- Pages: 432 pages
- ISBN: 978-0-446-58006-9
- OCLC: 87752985
- Dewey Decimal: 796.812/092 B
- LC Class: GV1196.J47 A3 2007
- Followed by: Undisputed: How to Become World Champion in 1,372 Easy Steps

A Lion's Tale: Around the World in Spandex is an autobiography of professional wrestler Chris Jericho. It details his life from his early years, to his debut for World Wrestling Entertainment (WWE), on August 9, 1999. The book is followed by a sequel, Undisputed: How to Become World Champion in 1,372 Easy Steps, which was released in 2011. A second sequel, Best in the World (At What I Have No Idea), was released in 2014.

== History ==
Jericho started writing A Lion's Tale shortly after leaving the WWE, in August 2005. For the purposes of the book, which mainly detail his life from 1990–1999, WWE is referred to as the World Wrestling Federation (WWF), as this was the name of the company when Jericho made his début. The World Wrestling Federation changed its name to World Wrestling Entertainment in 2002.

== Content ==
The book begins with a quick account of Jericho's thoughts whilst making his now-trademark countdown entrance during his WWF début. The book then flashes back to his early years, as a seven-year-old growing up in Winnipeg, Manitoba, Canada. Jericho discusses his first exposure to professional wrestling, watching it on a TV in his grandmother's basement. He would later attend American Wrestling Association (AWA) live events at the Winnipeg Arena with his father, former professional ice hockey left winger, Ted Irvine, before being replaced in 1983, by the World Wrestling Federation. As he reached his teens, Jericho would later engage with WWF wrestlers, who would be staying at nearby hotels, when performing in the Winnipeg area. Jericho would later emulate the actions of WWF superstars with friends, in his promotion, the Big Time Wrestling Federation (BTWF).

Jericho later recalls the first time he saw Stampede Wrestling, a wrestling promotion based in Calgary, Alberta, on television in 1986. Jericho states it was shortly after this time that this was when his path (to becoming a professional wrestler) became written in stone, as he watched Owen Hart, (who was of a similar build) perform his entrance. It was whilst watching a Stampede show, that Jericho (then seventeen years old) saw an advert for the Hart Brothers Pro Wrestling Camp. Jericho promptly wrote to the address on the screen, hoping to enroll. A few weeks later, he received a reply from Ed Langley, the Hart Brothers Camp representative, who stated that Jericho needed to be eighteen years old and meet the weight classification of around 225 lb (102 kg). Jericho would spend the next year graduating from high school and attending Red River Community College, obtaining a degree in journalism, following the advice given to him by Jesse "The Body" Ventura", to have something to fall back on, after meeting Ventura at a celebrity hockey game that Jericho's father was playing in.

From there, Jericho recalls a brief meeting with Keith Hart during the summer of 1988, at the Hart Brothers Camp in Okotoks, whilst accompanying his father to a charity golf game in Calgary. Later that summer, Jericho joined local promotion, the Keystone Wrestling Alliance (KWA) and began touring as part of their ring crew. After the tour ended, Jericho headed for the Hart Brothers Pro Wrestling Camp and it was there he met another future fellow professional wrestler, Lance Storm.

Jericho's book later tells of his début match for the Canadian Wrestling Connection (CWC), against Storm (billed as Lance T. Storm) on October 2, 1990, as "Cowboy" Chris Jerico, a cowboy from Casper, Wyoming, in a 10-minute time limit draw and working the Canadian independent circuit, before travelling to Mexico and Germany, wrestling professionally for Smoky Mountain Wrestling (SMW) and travelling to Japan, before returning to the U.S. and signing with Extreme Championship Wrestling (ECW) in 1996, thanks to a recommendation from fellow wrestler (and future author), Mick Foley. Jericho would go on to win the ECW Television Championship once during his tenure for the Philadelphia-based organization, before signing for World Championship Wrestling (WCW), later in the year.

As a WCW employee, Jericho would end up winning the WCW Cruiserweight Championship on four separate occasions and the WCW World Television Championship, between 1996–98. Jericho's popularity in WCW was at its peak when he began taunting and challenging Bill Goldberg, with humorous vignettes. Goldberg had been undefeated in WCW since débuting and Jericho teased a very likely Goldberg-Jericho match-up. The angle was dropped and the match never materialized. It was at this point, frustrated by the lack of faith shown in him to be a top draw in the wrestling business, that Jericho realized his WCW career was over.

Feeling his career was on shaky ground, Jericho's personal life took an unexpected turn. Whilst eating in a Japanese restaurant in Tampa, Florida, Jericho met his future wife, Jessica, through fellow WCW employee, Disco Inferno, who introduced the pair to one another. Shortly after meeting Jessica, Jericho sprained his ankle during a match with Booker T. He was told he would be unable to wrestle for six weeks – Jericho had sixteen weeks left on his WCW contract at this point. After realizing that he had decided not to renew his contract, WCW President, Eric Bischoff suspended Jericho for the remaining four months of his contract. He never appeared for the promotion on television again, only at live shows. Jericho wrestled his last match in WCW as a tag team, teaming with Eddy Guerrero against the team of Billy Kidman and Rey Mysterio, Jr., on July 21. Five days later, Jericho sent a fax to Eric Bischoff, the day his WCW contract expired, to thank him for all the opportunities he'd been given, in his three years there. It was during this time that Jericho called Rich Ward, the two had previously met backstage at a WCW event in San Antonio, Texas, and share the same sense of humour and their love of heavy metal music. Ward suggested that Jericho come to Atlanta to sing with his band Fozzy Osbourne. Jericho would later join the band and Fozzy Osbourne would later evolve into the heavy metal band, Fozzy, with Jericho as the lead vocalist and Ward playing lead guitar and singing back-up vocals.

On May 23, 1999, at the WWF pay-per-view, Over the Edge, a freak accident occurred, which resulted in the death of Owen Hart. Although he didn't know Owen personally, Jericho felt obliged (as a surrogate member of the Hart family) to attend his funeral. It was at the funeral, during a conversation with Hulk Hogan that Jericho decided that he wanted to leave WCW and sign with the WWF. He would do so a month later, on June 30.

Now as a fully-fledged WWF employee, Jericho would spend the next few weeks coming up with ideas to introduce himself to WWF fans. He recalls standing in a post office, looking at a "Countdown to the Millennium" clock and decided to use the idea as his WWF entrance, which became his signature. The book ends as Jericho makes his WWF début on the August 9 episode of WWF RAW is WAR, at the Allstate Arena in Rosemont, Illinois.

Because of last minute changes, Jericho acknowledges the events of the Chris Benoit double murder and suicide, which occurred in June 2007. Shortly after Jericho finished writing in May 2007 and had handed in his copy of the manuscript to Grand Central Publishing, he requested and was allowed to make some final alterations to the book, to reflect upon the Benoit tragedy.

== Sources ==
- Jericho, Chris; Fornatale, Peter Thomas (2007). A Lion's Tale: Around the World in Spandex. New York, New York: Grand Central Publishing. 432pp. ISBN 978-0-446-58006-9.
