= Al Oeming =

Canadian conservationist

- Oeming with his cheetah, Tawana

Personal information
- Born: Albert Fredrick Hans Oeming; April 9, 1925 Edmonton, Alberta, Canada
- Died: March 17, 2014 (aged 88) Edmonton, Alberta, Canada

Professional wrestling career
- Billed height: 5 ft 11 in (1.80 m)
- Billed weight: 230 lb (100 kg)
- Trained by: Stu Hart

Albert Frederick Hans Oeming (April 9, 1925 – March 17, 2014) was a Canadian wildlife conservationist, zoologist, professional wrestler and wrestling promoter. Oeming co-founded the professional wrestling promotion Stampede Wrestling and owned the largest game farm in North America.

== Early life ==
Oeming was born on April 9, 1925, in Edmonton, Alberta, Canada to Albert and Elspeth Oeming, who had immigrated to Canada from Germany.

== Professional wrestling career ==
Oeming wrestled for the Capitol Wrestling Corporation in the 1940s on the urging of his boyhood neighbor Stu Hart whom he also served in the Royal Canadian Navy together with during World War II. He later co-founded the Stampede Wrestling promotion with Hart in 1948.

== Nature activism ==
Oeming was the Edmonton Zoological Society's inaugural president. He sought and rescued rare and endangered wild animals, particularly in northern and western Canada. Oeming toured the country attending schools with his tame cheetah Tawana to educate children about wildlife. In the 1980s Oeming starred in the television mini-series Al Oeming – Man of the North.

Oeming sometimes also loaned out some of his animals to the Disney company to use in their nature films.

== Personal life ==
Oeming was married twice, first to May Dorothy Dennistoun in 1950 and then to Gina Mrklas in 1978.

== Championships and accomplishments ==
- Canadian Wrestling Hall of Fame
  - Class of 2014

== Works published ==
=== Novels ===
- A Visit to Al Oeming's Alberta Game Farm (Commercial Printers Limited, Edmonton, 1963).

=== Articles ===
- Notes on the barred owl and snowy owl in Alberta (Nature Saskatchewan BlueJay Journal, Vol. 15 No. 4 - December 1, 1957).
- Goshawk Trapping in Alberta (Nature Saskatchewan BlueJay Journal, Vol. 16 No. 1 - March 1958)
- A Herd Of Musk-Oxen, Ovibos moschatus, in captivity (International Zoo Yearbook, Vol. 5 Issue 1 - January 1965).
- A Further Note On The Herd Of Musk-Oxen Ovibos moschatus at Alberta Game Farm (International Zoo Yearbook, Vol. 6 Issue 1 - January 1966)
- Notes On The Care and Nutrition of North American Sheep in Captivity (International Zoo Yearbook, Vol. 6 Issue 1 - January 1966).

== See also ==
- Animals in professional wrestling
