= Bret "Hitman" Hart — The Best There Is, The Best There Was, The Best There Ever Will Be =

Illustrated autobiography by Bret Hart

- Cover to the book, featuring Bret Hart.
- Author: Bret Sergeant Hart, Perry Lefko
- Language: English
- Subject: Wrestling
- Genre: Autobiography
- Published: 2000
- Publisher: Stoddart Publishing, Orion Publishing Group
- Publication place: Canada
- Media type: Hardcover and paperback
- Pages: 128
- ISBN: 978-0773760950
- Followed by: Hitman: My Real Life in the Cartoon World of Wrestling

Bret "Hitman" Hart — The Best There Is, The Best There Was, The Best There Ever Will Be is an illustrated autobiography by Canadian professional wrestler Bret Hart and Perry Lefko. It became a national bestseller in Canada. The preface was written by Roddy Piper.

== Background ==
Lefko first approached Hart's management about the book in 1998. It went through numerous incarnations until becoming what was published. Hart said he wrote it to remind people of many of his matches, images of which were owned and underplayed by WWE due to a soured relationship at the time.

== Content ==
The book's narrative is told mostly through photographs from Hart's career with text captions and wrestling stories. Due to his strained relationship with WWF at the time, no pictures owned by it are included. It reprints several family photos and some from a private collection, never before printed. Hart wrote a tribute to his brother Owen, who fell to his death at Over the Edge (1999).

The book contains quotes and comments from Ric Flair, Curt Hennig, Sting, Hulk Hogan and Bill Goldberg.

== Release and reception ==
The book had an initial printing of 150,000 copies which beat publisher Stoddart's previous record of 20,000 copies. Its president, Nelson Doucet, said: "At the sales conference, the salespeople recognized that we had a winner, and we were too conservative with our 35,000 initial printing, It became very obvious, very quickly, that we had a very successful title on our hands. The initial reaction from the market has confirmed that. The initial 150,000 print run is just the beginning. The book appeals not only to traditional market but also to specialty markets." He added that Hart is a very popular figure and that his career was filled with a lot of controversy. After the release, Hart took a book signing tour.

== Follow-up ==
Hart and Lefko wrote their second bestseller, Hitman: My Real Life in the Cartoon World of Wrestling, in 2007.

== See also ==
- Hart family
- Hart Legacy Wrestling

== Sources ==
- Heath McCoy (2007). Pain and Passion: The History of Stampede Wrestling. ECW Press. ISBN 978-1-55022-787-1.
- Lefko, Perry (2005). Pinball: The Making of a Canadian Hero. Wiley. ISBN 978-0470836903.
- White, William (2000). Buyer's Guide. Bowker.
