= Hart Dungeon =

Canadian professional wrestling school

- Building: Hart House
- Location: Calgary, Alberta
- Country: Canada
- Purpose: Training facility
- Named for: Stu Hart

The Hart Dungeon or Hart Family Dungeon, otherwise known simply as The Dungeon, was the gym and wrestling school located in the basement of the Hart mansion. The school was created by Stu Hart, patriarch of the Hart wrestling family and is known for having produced some of the greatest and most successful professional wrestlers of all time.

== Location description ==
The room was located in the Hart family mansion basement and had a very low ceiling. For most of the duration of the room being used as training hall there was a wrestling mat located on the floor without any ropes which would be used for training students.

== History ==
Hart acquired the former army hospital mansion in 1951 and transformed its basement into his personal training centre shortly thereafter. This was done because Hart needed a training facility after the founding of his first wrestling promotion in 1948. Although, the nickname itself developed over time when Stampede Wrestling became world famous.

Aside from professional wrestlers, the Dungeon provided training grounds for various athletes from strongmen to football players. The majority of Hart's sons trained in the Dungeon and went on to become involved in the wrestling world including Bret and Owen Hart. Other famous Dungeon graduates include Billy Graham, Greg Valentine, Bad News Brown, Davey Boy Smith, Brian Pillman, Jushin Thunder Liger, Ricky Fuji, Chris Jericho, Lance Storm, Chris Benoit, Justin Credible, Edge, Christian and Mark Henry.

As a teenager, Rhonda Sing approached members of the Hart wrestling family and asked to be trained, but she was rejected as they did not train women wrestlers at the time. Bret Hart, however, claims it had more to do with scheduling conflicts. Nattie "Natalya" Neidhart, daughter of Jim Neidhart and granddaughter of Stu, was ultimately the first woman to graduate from the Dungeon.

I take a lot of pride in being one of the last guys that had the hands-on training from Stu Hart when I went to the Hart family to train ... It was a good experience just to be there, to imagine all the people that had been through there, and all the blood, sweat, and tears that had been paid ... Going to the Hart family for training was kind of like, if you're a very religious person, going to the Vatican.

— Chris Benoit, WWE Unscripted, p. 54

One of the first televised acknowledgements of the nickname "Dungeon" was by then WWF color commentator Jesse Ventura. Its first significant exposure was in the documentary Hitman Hart: Wrestling with Shadows. In it, the Dungeon was moderately filmed for the first time and Stu Hart is shown demonstrating wrestling holds on a pupil. Bret also discusses being trained by his father and having submission holds applied to himself, often with graphic descriptions from his father of the holds' impact. A bonus feature on Bret's DVD set also shows him discussing the Dungeon.

Various activities took place in the Dungeon, ranging from weight lifting to Catch wrestling. Bret Hart has described the Dungeon in interviews as having holes in the walls and ceiling from bodies being driven into them. He also noted that practices could, at times, be as intense as MMA styled fighting. In July 1998, the WWF filmed a match between Owen Hart and Ken Shamrock in the Dungeon for the Fully Loaded pay-per-view.

== Reputation ==
During the period when Stu Hart was regularly training individuals at the school, it held a reputation for being one of the harshest wrestling schools in the world. Graduating from it was considered very impressive and something which would be brought up on air on televised wrestling shows. Hart himself also garnered a reputation for being borderline sadistic in his training techniques, and was known to torture his pupils with legitimate submission wrestling holds he had learned as a sports wrestler. Buddy Roberts described the place as "like a torture chamber". In contrast to his descendants, Stu never took money for his training services and did it mostly for the love of the artform of professional wrestling.

== Trainers ==
- Stu Hart
- Mr. Hito, head trainer after Stu Hart
- Kazuo Sakurada

== List of notable trainees ==
=== Men ===
- Abdullah the Butcher
- Al Oeming
- Archie Gouldie
- Bad News Brown
- Ben Bassarab
- Billy Jack Haynes
- Blake Norton
- Brian Pillman
- Chris Benoit
- Chris Jericho
- Christian
- Davey Boy Smith
- David Hart Smith
- Devon Nicholson
- Dynamite Kid
- Edge
- Eduardo Miguel Perez
- Fritz Von Erich
- Gama Singh
- Gene Anderson
- George Scott
- Gorilla Monsoon
- Greg Valentine
- Hiro Hase
- Dean Hart
- Smith Hart
- Ross Hart
- Wayne Hart
- Bret Hart
- Keith Hart
- Bruce Hart
- Owen Hart
- Jim Neidhart
- Jason Helton
- Jake Roberts
- Jos LeDuc
- Junkyard Dog
- Jushin Thunder Liger
- Justin Credible
- Ken Shamrock
- Klondike Bill
- Lance Storm
- Larry Cameron
- Luther Lindsay
- Mark Henry
- Masahiro Chono
- Michael Majalahti
- Nikolai Volkoff
- Paul LeDuc
- Ricky Fuji
- Roddy Piper
- Ruffy Silverstein
- Sandy Scott
- Shinya Hashimoto
- Steve Blackman
- Superstar Billy Graham
- Tyson Kidd
- Tom Magee
- Tyler Mane
- Viktor
- Yvon Durelle

=== Women ===
- Natalya Neidhart

== Legacy ==
In modern-day being trained in the Dungeon carries a level of status and there have been many attempts to recreate and recapture its glory. In 2005 a documentary directed by Blake Norton (who trained at the school) named Surviving the Dungeon: The Legacy of Stu Hart was released.

=== Subsequent training camps run by members of the Hart family ===
After their father's retirement some of the Hart brothers managed the school by themselves under the name Hart Brothers Training Camp which was also known by the nickname School of Hart Knocks. Leading up to the Hart House's sale in 2003, the Hart Brothers Training Camp run by Bruce, Keith and Ross was still running three times a week in the basement of the Hart mansion. A very similar training camp remains today at the family's gym, although none of the Hart brothers are involved.

Teddy Hart, Stu Hart's oldest grandson ran a training camp in Texas named Texas Hart Dungeon from around 2012 to 2015. Smith Hart, Stu's oldest son founded a new wrestling school in 2015 named Dungeon Discipline Professional Wrestling School which is run out of Calgary and Berrie in Alberta, after Smith's passing in 2017 the training is mostly handled by Smith's son Matthew.
