= Heath McCoy =

Canadian sports journalist

Heath McCoy is a Canadian sports journalist and author, best known for his work on professional wrestling, having written two acclaimed books about Canadian professional wrestling.

== Career ==
McCoy has written two non-fiction historical books about professional wrestling in Canada, the first being Pain and Passion: The History of Stampede Wrestling in 2005 which is about the iconic Stampede Wrestling promotion and territory, and the second being 2008's Benoit: Wrestling with the Horror that Destroyed a Family and Crippled a Sport about wrestler Chris Benoit and his double-murder and suicide. Both books were considered for the Wrestling Observer Newsletter award for Best Pro Wrestling Book. McCoy was lauded for his expert research for the book Pain and Passion.

Outside of his writing McCoy has also appeared in media several times, often being interviewed for his deep knowledge on wrestling. He appeared on the Chris Benoit Memorial Show and in the documentary film Bret Hart: Survival of the Hitman.

== Personal life ==
McCoy was married to fellow journalist Tamara Gignac who died in 2015 of cancer. They have one daughter, Bronwyn, and one son, Finn.

== Works ==
- Pain and Passion: The History of Stampede Wrestling (2005) ISBN 978-1550227871
- Benoit: Wrestling with the Horror that Destroyed a Family and Crippled a Sport (with Steven Johnson, Irv Muchnick and Greg Oliver) (2007) ISBN 1550228129

== See also ==
- Hart wrestling family
