= Hart House (Calgary) =

Residence in Calgary, Alberta, Canada

Coordinates: 51.062008°N 114.168982°W

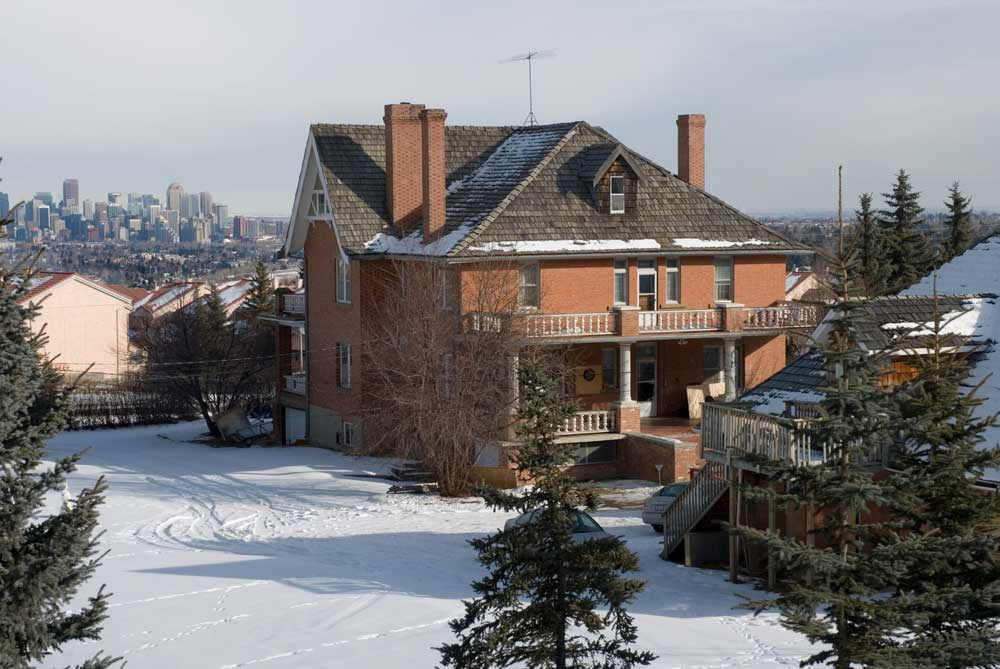
- The Hart House overlooking Calgary
- Interactive map of the Hart House area
- Former names: Varsity Heights; Crandell House
- Alternative names: Hart Mansion; Crandell-Hart House

General information
- Status: Protected, used as a hotel
- Type: Mansion
- Architectural style: Victorian and Edwardian
- Location: 435 Patina Place SW, Calgary, Alberta, Canada
- Completed: 1905

The Hart House, sometimes known as the Hart mansion, is a residence located in the Patterson Heights neighbourhood of Calgary, Alberta, Canada. Once owned by Stu Hart, it was home to his extensive professional wrestling family for 52 years from October 1951 until Stu Hart's death in October 2003. While not built for them nor any longer under ownership of the Harts, the mansion continues to be referred to as the Hart House.

During the ownership of the Hart family the mansion's basement was used as a training hall and wrestling school known as the Hart Dungeon, which produced many successful pro wrestlers. Besides the Hart family the mansion also housed many other wrestlers as well as an abundance of family pets and circus animals which were sometimes used in the Stampede Wrestling shows.

The building has a large historical value for the wrestling industry and WWE recognized it as being as important and significant as Madison Square Garden. In 2012 the building was declared a heritage site by the city of Calgary.

== History ==
=== Early history ===
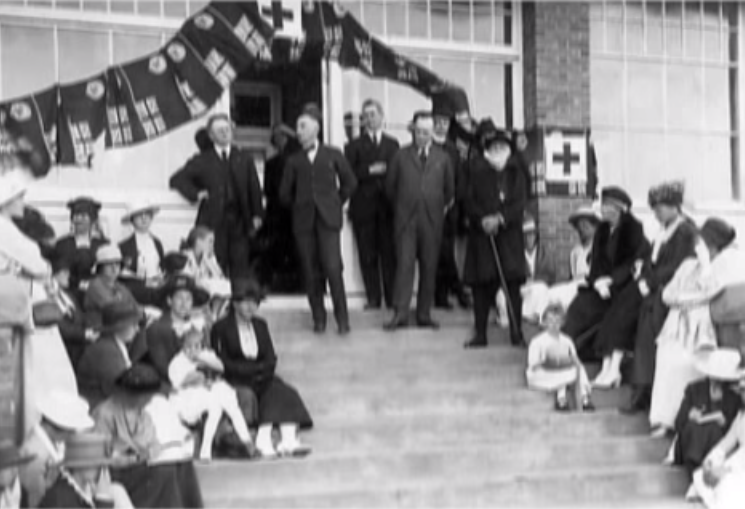
The Hart mansion at its inauguration as a Red Cross children's home

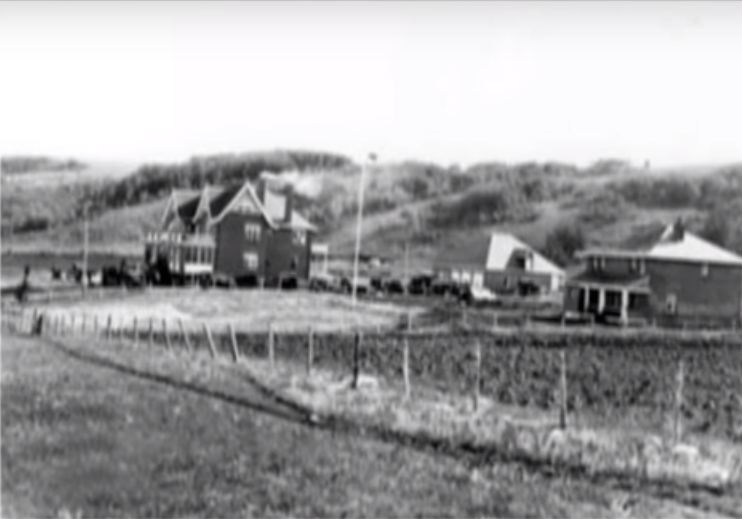
The mansion in 1920

The 5,600-square-foot (520 m^{2}) home, sitting on 2.17 acres (0.88 ha) of land, was built in 1905 by businessman Edward Crandell. It was converted into the Soldiers' Children's Home for Orphans in 1920 and then bought by Judge Henry Stuart Patterson from the Crandells. According to Henry Patterson's youngest son, Arthur Patterson (1924–2018), the orphanage ran out of money and abandoned the house. The vacant mansion was severely damaged by years of rain that poured in through broken windows.

The Patterson family saved the house from further destruction and invested substantially in restoring it. The original, high quality workmanship of the historic home was intentionally respected during renovations. In particular, Arthur Patterson spoke of the heavily damaged hardwood floors made with such workmanship that the British tradesman who restored the flooring wept as he worked, saying he hadn't seen such quality since leaving England.

The reason the mansion stood alone on its hill overlooking Calgary for so many decades, according to Arthur Patterson, is that no others were willing to drill water wells as deep as Edward Crandell had. Neighboring lands were occasionally purchased and abandoned for the difficulty obtaining water.

=== Under Hart ownership ===
It was sold to Stu Hart in October 1951 for $25,000, with Stu, his wife Helen, and their young sons Bruce and Keith moving into the Hart House from their old address in Great Falls, Montana. Stu later collected their eldest son, Smith, from Helen's parents' house in New York, where he had been living with his maternal grandparents for over two years since a 1949 car crash that had resulted in Helen being hospitalized while she was pregnant with Bruce. Stu and Helen went on to have another nine children during their residence at the Hart House; Wayne, Dean, Ellie, Georgia, Bret, Alison, Ross, Diana and Owen, with Bret and Owen going on to achieve huge fame in professional wrestling, in the World Wrestling Federation (WWF).

In its Hart-owned state, the mansion featured twenty-two rooms, four fireplaces, five chandeliers from Edmonton's historic McDonald Hotel, two porches, a view of downtown Calgary, and a coach house behind the main house which was joined to the main house through a greenhouse. Calgary artist Katie Ohe rented the coach house from the Harts and lived there for a time.

=== 2003 sale ===
After the death of Stu Hart on October 16, 2003, the majority of his ten surviving children agreed to put the Hart House up for sale. Alison Hart gave several tours of the home to guests before finally handing down ownership of the $2 million home.

=== After ===
In June 2006, the city's preservation plans for the mansion were defeated in a tied 7-7 city council vote, leaving it susceptible to demolition. In October, however, a revised plan was authorized for thirteen townhouses to be built around the mansion as well as its restoration. In 2008 Ross Hart spoke of his wish for the building to be renovated but preserved in its original form. Construction was supposed to begin in summer 2007, but these plans were never implemented. Although the property went up for sale again in spring 2010, it was not sold. In December 2012, it was designated as a municipal heritage site by the City of Calgary as part of a development deal which also allowed the owner to build nine houses with secondary suites on the Hart House's undeveloped grounds.

After being renovated in 2013, the house was offered for renting. The renovated building includes a modern security system, a gourmet kitchen, a library, a home office, a gym, family rooms and six bedrooms.

== The Dungeon ==
The Hart Dungeon was the gym and training school used by Stu Hart and some of his sons to train wrestlers and other athletes which was located in the mansion's basement.

== Accolades ==
- Canadian Wrestling Hall of Fame
  - In the "places" category
