= EPACT Network =

- Founded: 2012
- Type: Public
- Location: Vancouver, Canada
- Key people: Christine Sommers and Kirsten Koppang-Telford, Founders
- Website: EPACT

ePACT Network is an online emergency network. Users build networks of family, friends, and organizations, store and exchange information and access web and mobile communication tools for use in a crisis. ePACT is built by ePACT Network Ltd., a software company located in North Vancouver, BC, Canada. The company is a graduate of Vancouver tech accelerator, GrowLab (now Highline, a participant in the Canadian Technology Accelerator, TechWomen and 48Hrs in the Valley programs in San Francisco, and has been recognized as one of Ready to Rocket, a business recognition program for BC’s tech sector, 'ICT Emerging Rockets’. The ePACT team has received numerous awards, including North Vancouver Chamber of Commerce Business of the Year and Western Economic Diversification WINN program.

== History ==
ePACT Network Ltd. was founded by Christine Sommers and Kirsten Koppang-Telford in January, 2012. The idea for ePACT came from Ayumi, a survivor of the 2011 Japanese earthquake and tsunami, who was separated from her family and unable to contact them by text, landline or cellular phone after the disaster. A day after the earthquake hit, Ayumi was finally able to communicate via email with her parents, finding out her family had survived the natural disasters that hit her hometown of Fukushima

ePACT was in closed beta from May 2012 to July 2013 with several elementary schools, daycares, sports teams and a secondary school in the Lower Mainland of Vancouver, BC.

The system was subsequently made available for families and organizations to use anywhere in the world; however, it is currently only offered in English. As the Official Emergency Preparedness Sponsor, ePACT was used in the Medical Tent by support personnel managing response to medical crises for athletes participating in the 2013 Challenge Penticton triathlon on August 25. The system was used to alert medical staff to any medical considerations about athletes brought into the tent, such as allergies, medications they were taking, recent illnesses or injuries that could impact their health or response to medical care. The system was also used by support staff to contact the friends and relatives of athletes in the Medical Team to alert them to their location and let them know when they were released at point of recovery, or if they were taken by ambulance to the hospital for additional care.

In 2014, ePACT was adopted by sports organizations across Canada, before moving into the Parks & Recreation market in Canada and the United States. partnering with the National Recreation and Parks Association.

== Features ==
Family users create an ePACT account to securely store emergency information, such as medical details and emergency contacts, for each member of their household. They then build a support network of family, friends and organizations (like schools or sports team) who support them. Families either send invites to friends or relatives they would like to connect with, or they receive invites from organizations that require their emergency information to support them day to day or in a crisis.

Organizations use ePACT to invite their members to share emergency information with them so they can access critical details like medical needs (e.g. allergies, medications, recent illnesses) or key contacts (e.g. legal guardians of dependent children or adults, or support contacts like nannies, grandparents or neighbours if guardians are not accessible). Once connected, users can access the system anytime, anywhere via web or mobile, and communicate through the system.

== Pricing ==
ePACT family accounts are free to register and use, while organizations pay an annual licensing fee to connect to members they serve, access data, reporting and communications.
