= List of family relations in professional wrestling =

This is a list of family relations in professional wrestling. Since the beginning of the artform's secretive history, family members have been involved in all aspects of the industry, often to keep it closed off to outsiders. Although most connections are among wrestlers, there have been contributions from family members in many other fields, such as managing, promoting, training and refereeing.

== Siblings ==
=== Full ===
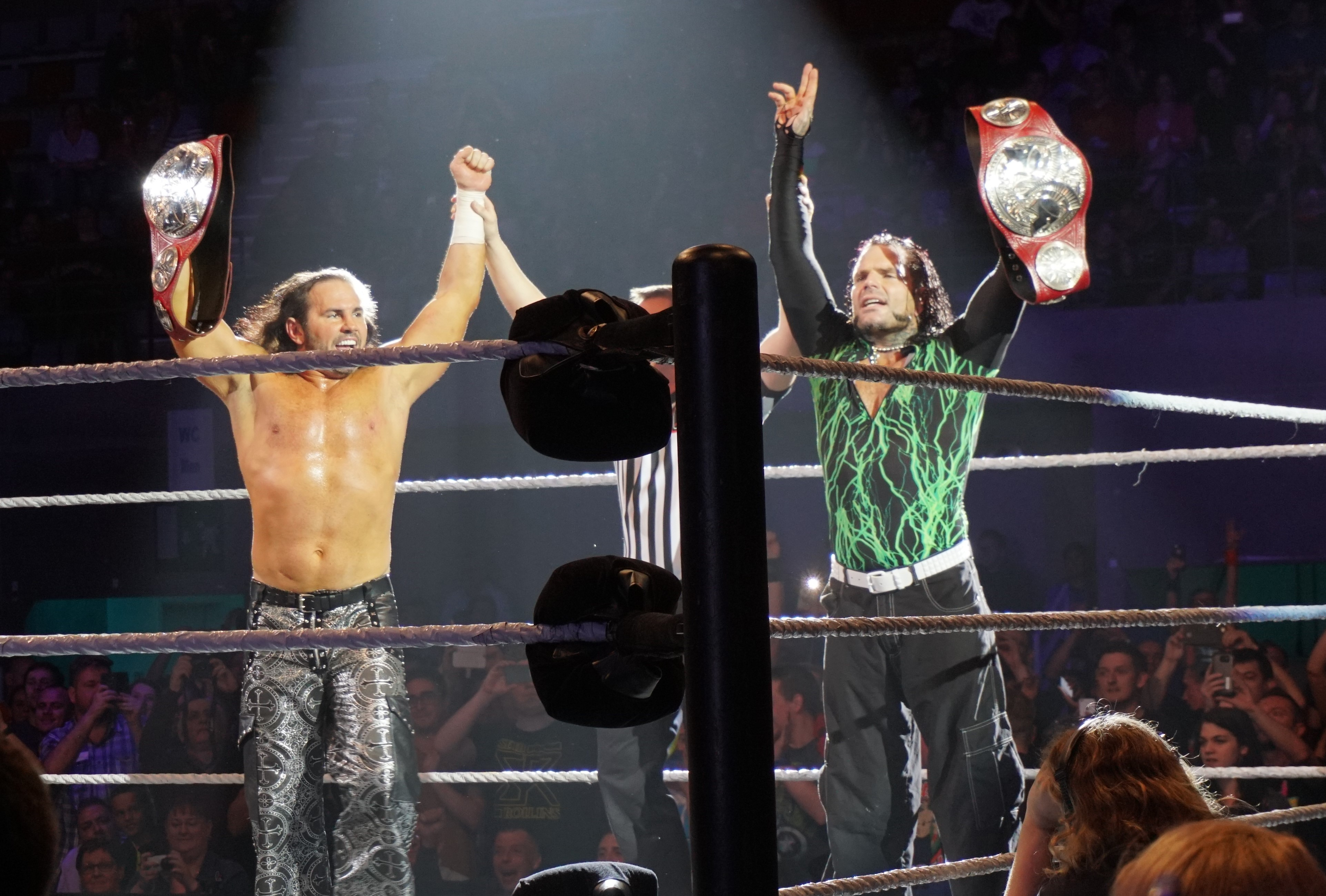
Brothers Matt and Jeff Hardy, as a tag-team they are known as The Hardy Boyz

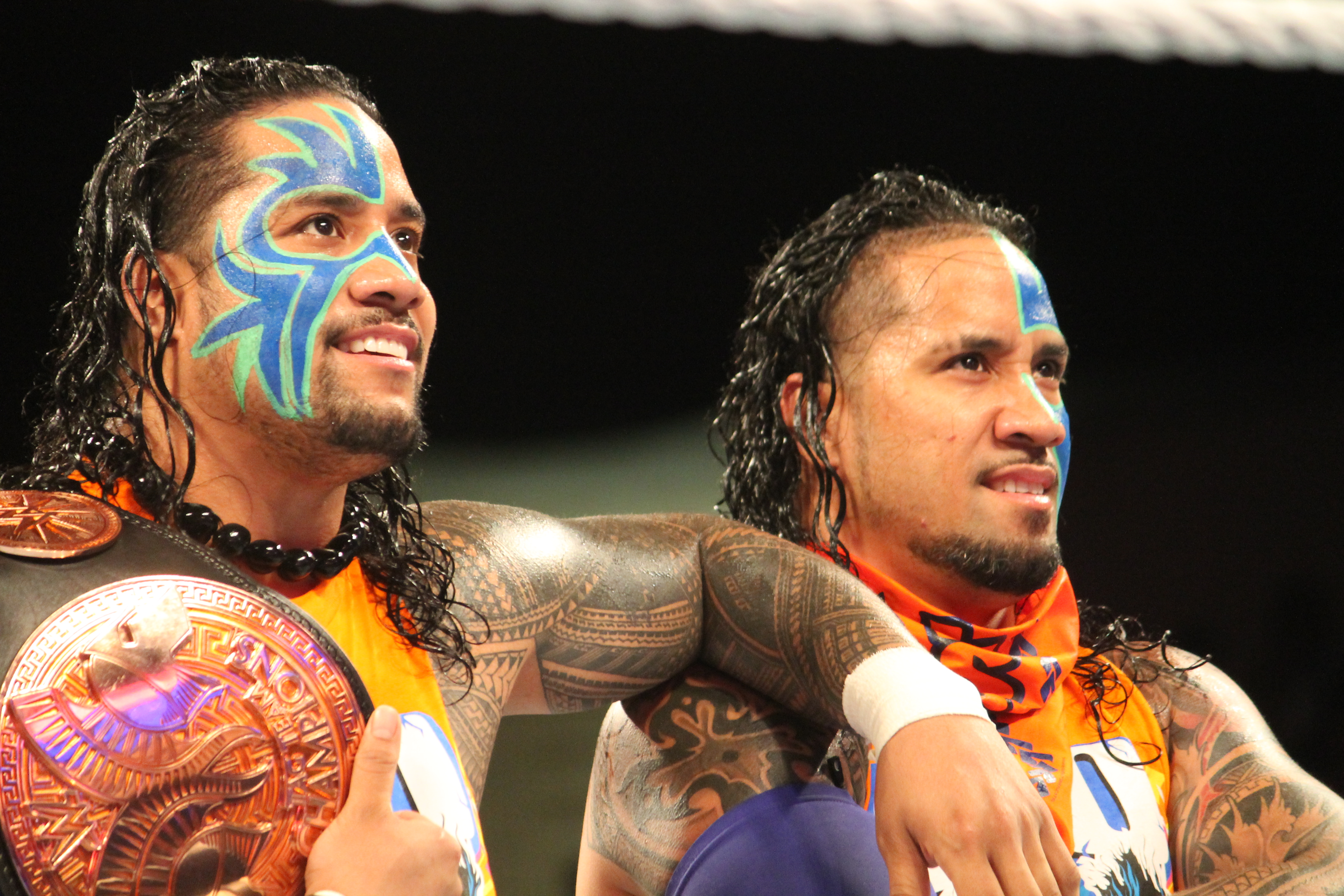
Jimmy and Jey Uso, twins of the Anoaʻi family who perform in the tag team The Usos

Surname	Siblings	Country	Note(s)	Ref(s)
Alvarado	El Brazo; Brazo de Oro; Brazo de Plata; Super Brazo; Brazo Cibernético; Brazo de Platino	Mexico	In this branch of the Alvarado wrestling family, Brazo de Oro was the oldest of the six brothers (all six are sons of Shadito Cruz, patriarch and founder of the Alvarado family).	
Alvarado	Maximo; Psycho Clown; Goya Kong; Muñeca de Plata; Robin; Andros de Plata	Mexico	In this branch of the Alvarado wrestling family, Máximo is the oldest of the six siblings (all six are children of Brazo de Plata, Shadito Cruz's third son).	
Angle	Eric; Kurt	United States	Eric is the older of the two brothers.	
Annis	Edward Annis; Matthew Annis	Canada		
Anoa'i	Afa; Sika	American Samoa		
Anoa'i	Rosey; Roman Reigns	United States	Rosey was the older of the two brothers (15 years apart)	
Ashford-Smith	Chris Champion; Mark Starr	United States		
Barrow	Clint; Houston	United States		
Basham	Doug; Danny	United States	Kayfabe brothers	
Bass	Ron; Don	United States		
Batten	Bart; Brad	United States		
Brisco	Jack; Jerry	United States		
Carolan	Joey; Patrick	Canada		
Castellanos	Psicosis; Fobia	Mexico		
Christy	Ted; Vic	United States		
Coffey	Joe; Mark	Scotland		
Cole	Kent; Keith	United States		
Colt	Bobby; Jerry	United States		
Colón	Carly; Eddie	Puerto Rico		
Contreras	Ringo Mendoza; Cachorro Mendoza; Indio Mendoza	Mexico		
Cormier	Yvon Cormier; Leo Burke; Bobby Kay; Rudy Kay; Mel Turnbow	Canada		
Crist	Dave; Jake	United States		
Cuevas	El Supremo I El Supremo II	Mexico		
Curcuru	Chick Garibaldi; Gino Garibaldi	United States		
Eagles	Robbie; Ryan	Australia		
Escobedo	Black Nassel; Oso Negro	Mexico		
Espanto	Espanto I Espanto III	Mexico	Espanto II was also billed as a kayfabe brother of both men	
Estrada	El Canek; El Dantes I Principe Maya	Mexico		
Estrada	José Jr. Julio	Puerto Rico		
Fatu	Sam (The Tonga Kid); Solofa (Rikishi); Eddie (Umaga)	United States		
Fatu	Jonathan (Jimmy), Joshua (Jey) Joseph (Solo Sikoa)	United States	Jonathan and Joshua are twins	
Fulton	Bobby, Jackie	United States		
Garcia	Tony Garea; Johnny Garcia	New Zealand		
Garcia-Colace	Nikki Bella; Brie Bella	United States	Identical twins who formed one of the most successful women's tag-teams in professional wrestling, The Bella Twins	
Garza	Héctor; Humberto Jr.	Mexico		
Gibson	Robert Gibson; Ricky Gibson	United States		
Hardy	Matt; Jeff	United States		
Harris	Ron; Don	United States		
Hart	Smith Hart; Bruce Hart; Keith Hart; Wayne Hart; Dean Hart; Ellie Hart; Georgia Hart; Bret Hart; Alison Hart; Ross Hart; Diana Hart; Owen Hart	Canada		
Hart	Torrin Hart; Bruce Hart Jr.	Canada		
Hebner	Dave Hebner, Earl Hebner	United States	Twin brothers who both worked as referees in WWE from 1988 to 2005. Earl is now with AEW and Dave has retired	
Huffman	Booker T, Stevie Ray	United States		
Hughes	Terrence, Terrell	United States	Terrence and Terrell are twins	
Ibarra	Super Parka, Johnny Ibarra, El Desalmado	Mexico		
Irwin	Scott Irwin, Bill Irwin	United States		
Jumonji	Dash Chisako, Sendai Sachiko	Japan		
Kasper	Drew, Jacob	United States		
Kelly	Pat Kelly, Mike Kelly	Canada		
Kernodle	Don Kernodle, Rocky Kernodle	United States		
Knott	Lucy, Kelly	England		
Lagarde	Karloff Lagarde, Ángel Negro	Mexico		
Laurinaitis	Road Warrior Animal, Johnny Ace, Marcus Laurinaitis	United States		
Lizmark	Lizmark, Lizmark II	Mexico		
Martin	Darius, Dante	United States		
Martínez	Tony Arce, Rocco Valente	Mexico		
Massie	Matthew, Nicholas	United States		
Matematico	El Matematico I, El Matematico II	Mexico		
Mata	Raul Mata, Carlos Mata	Mexico		
Maximo	Jose Maximo, Joel Maximo	United States		
McGuckin	Jigsaw, Jolly Roger	United States		
Miller	Bill Miller, Dan Miller	United States		
Monroe	Sputnik Monroe, Jet Monroe	United States	Rocket Monroe was also billed as a kayfabe brother of both men	
Mora	Benjamin Mora, Alcatraz	Mexico		
Mulkey	Bill Mulkey, Randy Mulkey	United States		
Nemeth	Nic (Dolph Ziggler), Ryan (Briley Pierce)	United States		
Odate	Masami Odate (Io), Mio	Japan		
Orndorff	Paul Orndorff, Terry Orndorff	United States		
Ortiz	Pirata Morgan, Verdugo, Hombre Bala	Mexico		
Poffo	Randy, Lanny	United States		
Power	Larry, Dave	United States		
Prichard	Tom, Bruce	United States		
Pugh	Jay Briscoe, Mark Briscoe	United States		
Randhawa	Dara Singh, Randhawa	India	Also actors, see the extended family tree at List of Hindi film families.	
Ramirez	Kelvin, Julio	United States		
Reyes	Cien Caras, Máscara Año 2000, Universo 2000	Mexico		
Rivera	Savio Vega, Dennis Rivera	Puerto Rico		
Rodríguez	Dos Caras; El Sicodelico; Mil Mascaras	Mexico		
Rotunda	Taylor (Bo Dallas); Windham (Bray Wyatt)	United States		
Rougeau	Jean Rougeau; Jacques Rougeau Sr.	Canada		
Rougeau	Armand Rougeau; Jacques Rougeau Jr. Raymond Rougeau	Canada		
Rougeau	Jean-Jacques Rougeau; Cedric Rougeau; Emile Rougeau	Canada		
Sarven	Logan Caine; Al Snow	United States		
Sato	Shu, Kei	Japan		
Sawyer	Brett Sawyer, Buzz Sawyer	United States		
Scott	George, Sandy Scott	Canada		
Shane	Mike Shane, Todd Shane	United States		
Sharpe	Ben Sharpe, Mike Sharpe Sr.	United States		
Shiiba	Kotoka; Oji	Japan		
Sihra	Gurv (Sunil Singh), Harv (Samir Singh)	Canada, India		
Solar	El Solar I, El Solar II	Mexico		
Stanlee	Steve Stanlee, Gene Stanlee	United States	Bob Stanlee was also billed as a kayfabe brother of both men	
Steamboat	Ricky Steamboat, Vic Steamboat	United States		
Steiner	Rick Steiner, Scott Steiner	United States	Rick is the older of the two brothers	
Stecher	Joe Stecher, Tony Stecher	United States		
Steveson	Bobby, Gable	United States		
Sydal	Matt Sydal, Mike Sydal	United States		
Takano	Gyoji "George" Takano, Shunji Takano	Japan		
Tapia	La Parka, El Hijo de Cien Caras	Mexico	La Parka is the older of the two brothers (11 years apart)	
Tolos	Chris Tolos, John Tolos	Canada	Chris was the older of the two brothers.	
Torres	Alberto Torres, Enrique Torres, Ramon Torres	United States		
Vachon	Paul Vachon, Maurice Vachon, Vivian Vachon	Canada		
Vigneault	Michel Vigneault, Rick Martel	Canada	Frenchy Martin was also billed as a kayfabe brother of both men	
Welch	Roy Welch; Jack Welch; Herb Welch; Lester Welch	United States		
Williamson	Charlette, Robyn	United States		
Wilson	Justice Pain, Nick Gage	United States	Justice was the older of the two brothers.	
Zbyszko	Stanislaus Zbyszko, Wladek Zbyszko	United States	The Zbyszko brothers were Poles born in what was then Austria-Hungary, but achieved their greatest fame in the U.S.	

=== Half ===
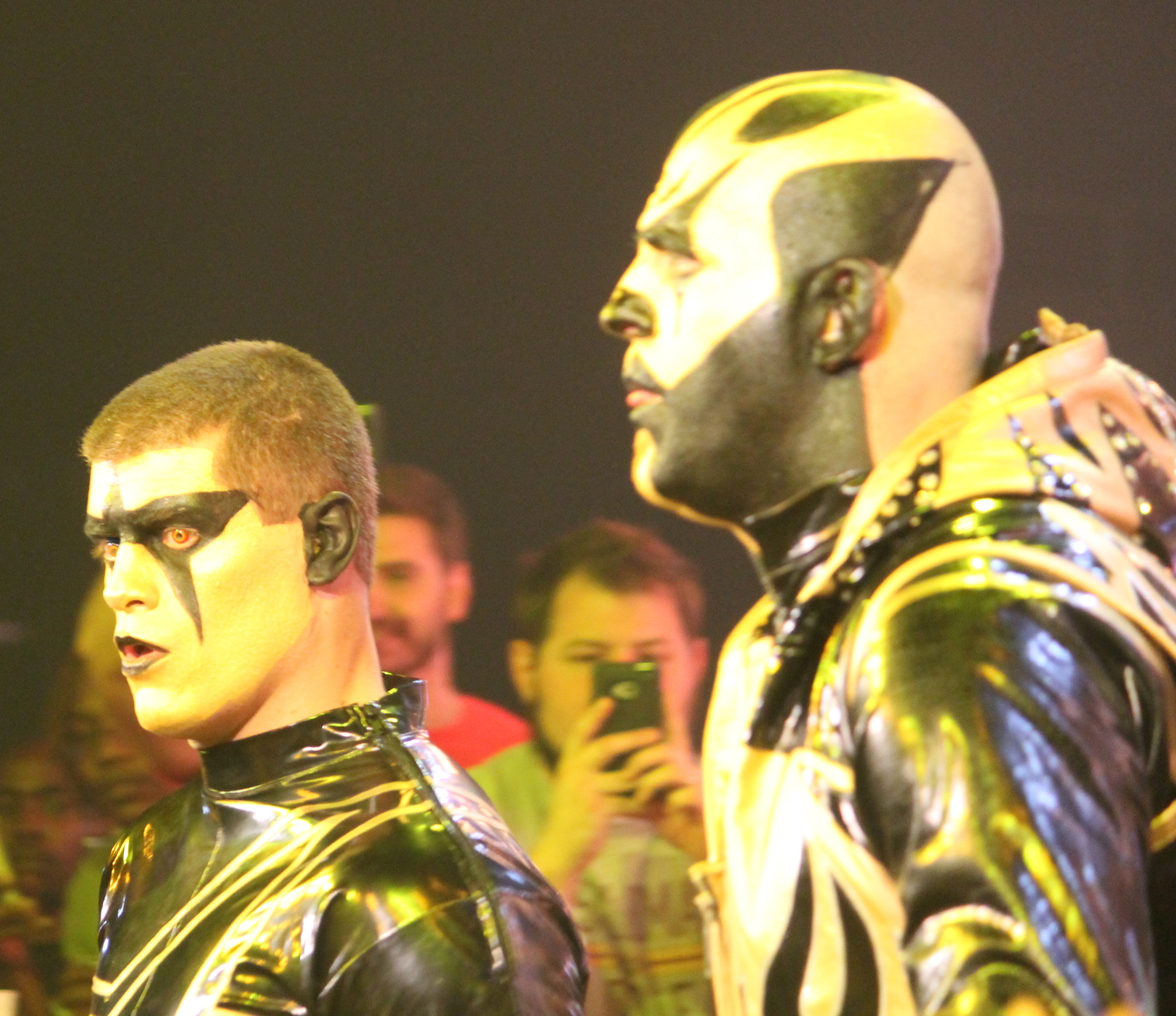
Cody Rhodes with his older half brother Dustin Rhodes.

Common parent	Sibling(s)	Sibling(s)	Country	Note(s)	Ref(s)
Mother	Brian Pillman Jr.	Lexi Pillman	United States		
Mother	Mike Hart	Matt Hart	Canada		
Father	Mike DiBiase	Ted DiBiase Jr. Brett DiBiase	United States		
Father	David Flair	Reid Flair; Charlotte Flair	United States		
Father	Dustin Rhodes	Cody Rhodes	United States		
Mother	Tama Tonga	Hikuleo	United States		

=== Adopted, step and foster ===
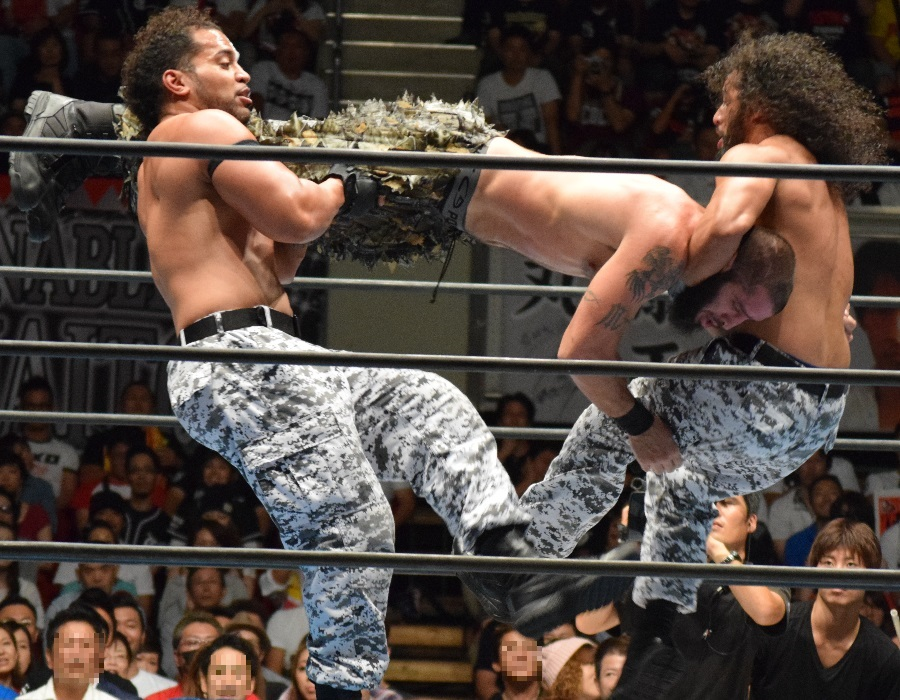
Adopted brothers Tama Tonga and Tanga Loa performing a tag-team move.

Sibling(s)	Step/adopted/foster sibling(s)	Country	Note(s)	Ref(s)
Dutch Savage	Luke Brown	United States		
Tanga Loa	Hikuleo; Tama Tonga	United States	Tanga's mother was Hikuleo and Tama's maternal aunt, she and her husband adopted them.	

== Parents–children ==
=== Biological ===
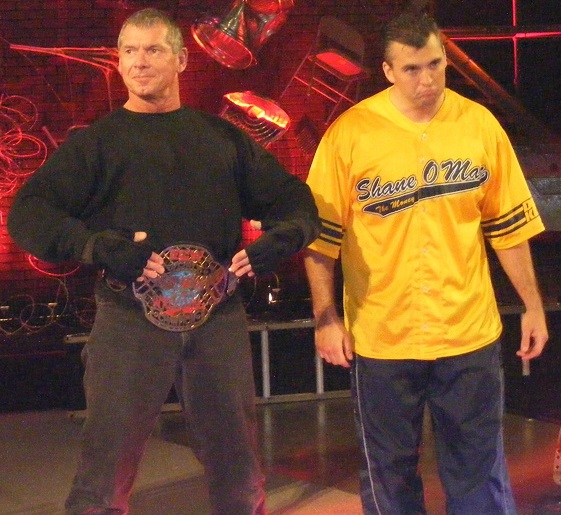
Vince McMahon (left), as ECW World Heavyweight Champion, with his son Shane (right). Vince and Shane McMahon have both wrestled with and against each other. Vince himself is the son of wrestling promoter Vince McMahon, Sr., who was the son of promoter Jess McMahon

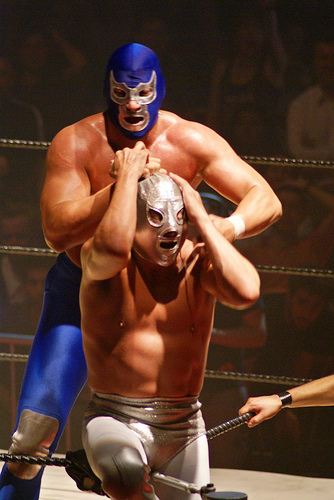
The son of El Santo, El Hijo del Santo (silver) wrestling Blue Demon Jr. (blue), the adopted son of Blue Demon

Last name	Parent	Child(ren)	Country	Note(s)	Ref(s)
Aguayo	Perro Aguayo	Perro Aguayo Jr.	Mexico		
Almanza	Dr. Karonte	Astro Boy; Argenis; Argos; Los Psycho Circus; Místico	Mexico		
Amezcua	Al Amezcua	Alfonso Dantés; Septiembre Negro	Mexico		
Amezcua	Alfonso Dantés	Apolo Dantés; Cesar Dantés	Mexico		
Anderson	Doug Anderson	Cheerleader Melissa	United States		
Anderson	Gene Anderson	Brad Anderson	United States		
Rogowski	Ole Anderson	Bryant Anderson	United States	Actual father and son, but Anderson surname is strictly kayfabe (unlike Gene and Brad, above)	
Annis	B. J. Annis	Teddy Hart; Matthew Annis	Canada	See also: Hart wrestling family	
Anoa'i	Afa	Samula Anoaʻi; Lloyd Anoaʻi; Afa Anoaʻi Jr.	American Samoa; United States	Afa was born in American Samoa; his sons were born and primarily raised on the United States mainland	
Anoa'i	Sika	Matt Anoa'i (Rosey); Joe Anoaʻi (Roman Reigns)	American Samoa, United States	Sika was born in American Samoa; his sons were born and primarily raised on the United States mainland	
Armstrong	"Bullet" Bob	Brian; Brad; Scott; Steve	United States		
Baños	Lizmark	Lizmark Jr. El Hijo de Lizmark	Mexico		
Bassarab	Ben Bassarab	Lindsay B. Hart	Canada		
Barr	Sandy	Art; Jesse; Shawn	United States		
Befumo	Andrew	Eric	United States		
Benoit	Chris Benoit	David Benoit	United States		
Beyer	Dick	Kurt Beyer	United States		
Blanchard	Joe Blanchard	Tully Blanchard	United States		
Blanchard	Tully Blanchard	Tessa Blanchard	United States		
Bockwinkel	Warren Bockwinkel	Nick Bockwinkel	United States		
Borne	Tony Borne	Matt Borne	United States		
Brazil	Bobo Brazil	Bobo Brazil Jr.	United States		
Brisco	Gerald Brisco	Wes Brisco	United States		
Brito	Jack Britton	Gino Brito Sr.	Canada		
Brito	Gino Brito Sr.	Gino Brito Jr.	Canada		
Brookside	Robbie	Xia	United Kingdom		
Buchanan	Barry	Benjamin	United States		
Canterbury	Mark Canterbury	Shane Canterbury	United States		
Casas	Ruiz Pepe Casas	Negro Casas; El Felino; Heavy Metal	Mexico		
Castillo	Hurricane Castillo Sr.	Hurricane Castillo Jr.	Cuba/Puerto Rico		
Charles	Emilio Charles Sr.	Emilio Charles Jr.	Mexico		
Cobarde	El Cobarde Sr.	El Cobarde Jr.	Mexico		
Colón	Carlos Sr.	Carly, Eddie	Puerto Rico		
Cohen	Sammy Cohen	Shaun Cohen	South Africa		
Conway	Tiger Conway Sr.	Tiger Conway Jr.	United States		
Creatchman	Eddie Creatchman	Floyd Creatchman	Canada		
Crockett	Jim Crockett Sr.	Jim Crockett Jr.	United States		
Cruz	Black Shadow	El Hijo de Black Shadow	Mexico		
Curcuru	Gino Garibaldi	Leo Garibaldi	United States		
Curry	Bull Curry	Fred Curry Sr.	United States		
Curry	Fred Curry Sr.	Fred Curry Jr.	United States		
Darsow	Barry Darsow	Dakota Darsow	United States		
Díaz	Septiembre Negro	Septiembre Negro Jr.	Mexico		
Nevins	Helen Hild	Ted DiBiase	United States	DiBiase's step father was wrestler Iron Mike DiBiase	
DiBiase	Ted DiBiase	Mike DiBiase II; Ted DiBiase Jr. Brett DiBiase	United States		
Duncum	Bobby Duncum Sr.	Bobby Duncum Jr.	United States		
Dundee	Bill Dundee	J. C. Ice	United States		
Duprée	Emile Duprée	Rene Duprée, Jeff Duprée	Canada		
Eaton	Bobby Eaton	Dillon Eaton	United States		
Escobedo	Oso Negro	América Salvaje; Azteca de Oro; Dalton Stone; Javier Escobedo	Mexico		
Espanto	Espanto III	Espanto IV; Espanto V	Mexico		
Espectro	El Espectro	Hijo del Espectro; El Picudo	Mexico		
Estrada	El Canek	Hijo del Canek; El Canek Jr.	Mexico		
Estrada	Jose Estrada Sr.	Jose Estrada Jr. Julio Estrada	Puerto Rico		
Eudy	Sid Eudy	Gunner Eudy	United States		
Fantasma	El Fantasma	El Hijo del Fantasma	Mexico		
Farhat	Ed Farhat	Ed George	United States		
Fatu	Solofa Fatu Jr. (Rikishi)	Jonathan and Joshua Fatu (Jimmy and Jey Uso) Joseph Fatu (Solo Sikoa)	United States	Although the family has its origins in American Samoa, Solofa and his twin sons were born and primarily raised on the United States mainland.	
Fifita	Tonga Fifita	Alipate Leone; Tevita Fifita; Taula Fifita	Tonga		
Finley	Steve	Nicholas	United States		
Flair	Ric Flair	David Flair; Charlotte Flair; Reid Flair	United States	Actual family name is Fliehr, but the family pronounced its name as "Flair" before Ric was adopted into it as an infant.	
Francis	Ed Francis	Russ Francis; Bill Francis	United States	Russ Francis has briefly wrestled, but is far better known for his career in American football	
Fujinami	Tatsumi Fujinami	Leona	Japan		
Fuller	Roy Welch	Buddy Fuller	United States		
Fullington	Jim Fullington	Tyler Fullington	United States		
Funk	Dory Sr.	Dory Jr. Terry	United States		
Gagne	Verne Gagne	Greg Gagne	United States		
Garza	Humberto Garza	Hector Garza; Humberto Garza Jr.	Mexico		
Gilbert	Arlie	Tommy	United States		
Gilbert	Tommy	Doug; Eddie	United States		
Golden	Jimmy Golden	Bobby Golden	United States		
Golden	Eddie Golden	Evan Golden	United States		
González	El Medico Asesino	El Medico Asesino Jr.	Mexico		
González	Dr. Wagner	Dr. Wagner Jr. Silver King	Mexico		
González	Fuerza Guerrera	Juventud Guerrera	Mexico		
González	Ray González	Ray González Jr.	Puerto Rico		
Gordman	Black Gordman	Black Gordman Jr.	Mexico		
Gordy	Terry Gordy	Ray Gordy; Miranda Gordy	United States		
Graham	Eddie Graham	Mike Graham	United States		
Guerrero	Gory	Chavo Sr. Eddie; Hector; Mando	United States/Mexico	Gory and his oldest and youngest sons (respectively Chavo Sr. and Eddie) were born in the United States. Mando and Héctor were born in Mexico. All of them began their careers in Mexico	
Guerrero	Chavo Guerrero Sr.	Chavo Guerrero Jr.	United States/Mexico	Both were born in the U.S., but began their careers in Mexico	
Guerrero	Eddie	Shaul Guerrero	United States/Mexico	Eddie was born and raised in the U.S., but began his career in Mexico. His daughter Shaul Guerrero, who wrestles as Raquel Diaz, was also born and raised in the U.S., but has been based in the U.S. throughout her career	
Gulas	Nick Gulas	George Gulas	United States		
Gutiérrez	Óscar	Dominik	United States/Mexico	Rey (born Óscar Gutiérrez) was born and raised in the U.S., but began his career in Mexico. His son Dominik (who uses his real first name), also born and raised in the U.S., began his wrestling career in 2020 in WWE.	
Guzmán	Santo	El Hijo del Santo	Mexico		
Halcon	Astro Rey	Mephisto	Mexico		
Hall	Scott Hall	Cody Hall	United States		
Hamada	Gran (Hiroaki)	Ayako; Xóchitl	Japan/Mexico	Hamada is Japanese but his daughters are half-Mexican	
Hamilton	Jody Hamilton	Nick Patrick	United States		
Hart	Stu Hart and Helen Hart	Smith Hart; Bruce Hart; Keith Hart; Wayne Hart; Dean Hart; Ellie Hart; Georgia Hart; Bret Hart; Alison Hart; Ross Hart; Diana Hart; Owen Hart	Canada		
Hart	Bruce Hart	Bruce Hart Jr. Torrin Hart	Canada		
Hart	Alison Hart	Lindsay Hart	Canada		
Hart	Georgia Hart	Teddy Hart; Matthew Annis	Canada		
Hart	Ellie Hart	Natalya Neidhart	Canada		
Hart	Diana Hart	David Hart Smith	United Kingdom; Canada		
Hart	Frankie Hart	Bobby Hart	Canada		
Hashimoto	Shinya Hashimoto	Daichi Hashimoto	Japan		
Hebner	Earl Hebner	Brian Hebner	United States		
Hennig	Larry Hennig	Curt Hennig; Jesse Hennig	United States		
Hennig	Curt Hennig	Joseph Hennig; Amy Hennig	United States		
Hirai	Mitsu(aki)	Nobukazu	Japan		
Hirata	Super Strong Machine	Strong Machine J	Japan		
Hoshi	Hamuko Hoshi	Ibuki Hoshi	Japan		
Hussey	Jim Hussey	Mark Rocco	United Kingdom		
Iaukea	King Curtis Iaukea	Rocky Iaukea	United States		
Ibarra	Volador / Super Parka	Volador Jr.	Mexico		
Iihashi	Ishinriki Koji Utako Hozumi	Ishin Iihashi Riki Iihashi	Japan		
Jarrett	Jerry Jarrett	Jeff Jarrett; Jason Jarrett	United States		
Jonathan	Brother Jonathan	Don Leo Jonathan	United States		
Johnson	Bull Johnson	Dan Johnson	Canada		
Johnson	Rocky Johnson	Dwayne Johnson; Ricky Johnson	Canada, United States		Rocky Johnson is Canadian; his sons are Americans
Johnson	Dwayne Johnson	Simone Johnson	United States		
Kasai	Jun Kasai	Hinata Kasai	Japan		
Kashey	Abe Kashey	Al Kashey	United States		
Kimura	Kyoko; Isao Kobayashi	Hana	Japan		
Kiniski	Gene	Kelly; Nick	Canada		
Knight	Sweet Saraya	Saraya (Paige); Zak Zodiac	United Kingdom		
Lawler	Jerry Lawler	Brian Christopher; Kevin Christian	United States		
Leal	Tinieblas	Tinieblas Jr.	Mexico		
Linares	Rayo de Jalisco Sr.	Rayo de Jalisco Jr.	Mexico		
Linares	Rayo de Jalisco Jr.	Rayman	Mexico		
Llanes	Enrique Llanes	Javier Llanes	Mexico		
Lloyd	Paul Lloyd Sr.	Paul Lloyd Jr.	South Africa		
Malenko	Boris	Dean; Joe	United States		
Managoff	Bobby Managoff Sr.	Bobby Managoff	United States		
Marques	El Marques	El Marques Jr.	Mexico		
Matthews	Darren Matthews	Bailey Matthews	United Kingdom/United States		Bailey was born and raised in Atlanta, Georgia
Mayne	Ken Mayne	Lonnie Mayne	United States		
McGuirk	Leroy McGuirk	Mike McGuirk	United States		
McGuirk	Mike McGuirk	Max McGuirk	United States		
McMahon	Jess McMahon	Vincent J. Mcmahon	United States		
McMahon	Vincent J. McMahon	Vincent K. McMahon	United States		
McMahon	Vince	Shane; Stephanie	United States		
Mendoza	Ray	Villano I II; III; IV; V	Mexico		
Minton	Big John Studd	John Minton Jr.	United States		
Mochizuki	Masaaki Mochizuki	Mochizuki Jr.	Japan		
Momota	Rikidozan	Mitsuo Momota; Yoshihiro Momota	North Korea/Japan		Rikidozan was born in Japanese Korea
Momota	Mitsuo Momota	Chikara			
Monroe	Sputnik Monroe	Bubba Monroe	United States		
Moody	Paul Bearer	D.J. Pringle	United States		
Moreno	Alfonso Moreno	Cynthia Moreno; Esther Moreno; Rossy Moreno; Alda Moreno; El Oriental	Mexico		
Morton	Paul Morton	Ricky Morton	United States		
Mosca	Angelo Mosca Sr.	Angelo Mosca Jr.	United States		
Muñoz	Toro Blanco	Dragon Lee; Místico II; Rush	Mexico		
Muraco	Don Muraco	Joe Muraco	United States		
Murdoch	Frankie Murdoch	Dick Murdoch	United States		
Nagai	Mitsuya Nagai	Ryunosuke Nagai	Japan		
Navarro	Miguel Calderón Navarro	Trauma I Trauma II	Mexico		
Naya	Takatōriki Tadashige	Yukio	Japan		
Neidhart	Jim Neidhart	Natalya Neidhart	Canada		See also: Hart wrestling family
Núñez	Scorpio	Scorpio Jr.	Mexico		
Oates	Jerry Oates	Bo Oates	United States		
Oliver	Rip Sr.	Larry; Ray Jr.	United States		
Omukai	Michiko Omukai	Shinno	Japan		
Ortiz	Pirata Morgan	El Hijo de Pirata Morgan	Mexico		
Orton	Bob Sr.	Bob Jr. Barry O	United States		
Orton	Bob Jr.	Randy	United States		
Orton	Barry O	Jasper Orton	United States		
Owens	Don Owens	Barry Owens	United States		
Pérez	Miguel Sr.	Miguel Jr.	Puerto Rico		
Pesek	John Pesek	Jack Pesek	United States		
Pillman	Brian W. Pillman	Brian Z. Pillman (Lexis King)	United States		
Poffo	Angelo	Randy; Lanny	United States		
Portz	Geoff Portz	Scott McGhee	United States		
Putski	Ivan	Scott	United States		
Rechsteiner	Robert (Rick Steiner)	Bronson (Bron Breakker)	United States		
Rhodes	Dusty	Dustin, Cody	United States		
Rickard	Steve Rickard	Ricky Rickard; Tony Rickard	New Zealand		
Roberts	Nick Roberts and Lorraine Johnson	Baby Doll	United States		
Robinson	Joseph Robinson	Joe Robinson	United Kingdom		
Rodríguez	Dos Caras	Alberto Del Rio; El Hijo de Dos Caras	Mexico		
Rodríguez	Sicodelico Sr.	Sicodelico Jr.	Mexico		
Rodríguez	El Espectro II	Bestia Salvaje; Corazon Salvaje	Mexico		
Rodríguez	Victor Rodríguez	Noel Rodríguez; Manuel Rodríguez	Puerto Rico		
Romero	Ricky Romero	Steven; Mark; Chris	United States		
Rotunda	Mike Rotunda	Windham; Taylor	United States		
Rougeau	Jacques Sr.	Jacques Jr. Ray; Armand,	Canada		
Sakaguchi	Seiji	Yukio	Japan		
Sammartino	Bruno	David	United States		
Savoldi	Angelo Savoldi	Mario Savoldi; Tom Savoldi; Joseph Savoldi	United States		
Senerchia	Peter (Taz)	Tyler (HOOK)	United States		
Sharpe	Mike Sharpe Sr.	Mike Shape Jr.	Canada		
Shibata	Katsuhisa Shibata	Katsuyori	Japan		
Shinose	Mitoshichi (Akira) Shinose	Arisa Shinose	Japan		
Singh	Tiger Jeet Singh	Tiger Ali Singh	India/Canada		
Smith	Davey Boy Smith	Harry Smith	United Kingdom; Canada		See also: Hart wrestling family Davey Boy Smith was British; Harry Smith is British-Canadian
Smith	Aurelian Sr.	Aurelian Jr. Michael; Robin	United States		
Smith	Sam Houston and Baby Doll	Samantha Starr	United States		.
Snuka	Jimmy Sr.	Jimmy Jr. Sarona	Fiji/United States		The elder Jimmy Snuka is a native of Fiji, but established himself as a wrestler in the U.S.
Solitario	El Solitario	El Hijo Del Solitario	Mexico		
Sopp	Monty Sopp (Billy Gunn)	Austin Sopp; Colten Sopp	United States		
South	George South	George South Jr.	United States		
Stasiak	Stan Stasiak	Shawn Stasiak	United States		
Steamboat	Ricky Steamboat	Richie Steamboat	United States		
Steinborn	Milo Steinborn	Dick Steinborn	United States		
Tanaka	Duke Keomuka	Pat Tanaka	United States		
Tanaka	Minoru Tanaka Yumi Fukawa	Kizuna Tanaka	Japan		
Tapia	L.A. Park	Black Shadow	Mexico		
Taylor	Tug Taylor	Chaz Taylor	United States		
Timbs	Ken Timbs	Ken Timbs Jr.	United States		
Umino	Hiroyuki (Red Shoes Unno)	Shota	Japan		
Valentine	Johnny	Greg	United States		
Valencia	Doctor X	El Cobarde; Impostor; Convoy	Mexico		
Van Dale	Paul Van Dale	Leah Van Dale	United States		
Varga	Count Joseph Varga	Billy Varga	United States		
Vargas	Ángel Blanco	Hijo del Ángel Blanco I Hijo del Ángel Blanco II; El Angel Blanco Jr.	Mexico		
Von Erich	Fritz Von Erich	Chris Von Erich; David Von Erich; Kerry Von Erich; Kevin Von Erich; Mike Von Erich	United States		
Von Erich	Kerry Von Erich	Lacey Von Erich	United States		
Von Erich	Kevin Von Erich	Ross Von Erich; Marshall Von Erich	United States		
Watson	Whipper Billy Watson	Phil Watson	United States		
Watts	Bill Watts	Erik Watts	United States		
Wayne	Buddy Wayne	Ken Wayne	United States		
Weingeroff	Saul Weingeroff	George Weingeroff	United States		
Welch	Lester Welch	Roy Lee Welch	United States		
Welch-Fuller	Roy Welch	Buddy Fuller	United States		
Welch-Fuller	Buddy Fuller	Robert Fuller; Ron Fuller	United States		
Welch-Golden	Billy Golden	Bunkhouse Buck	United States		
Welch-Hatfield	Virgil Hatfield	Bobby Fields; Don Fields; Lee Fields	United States		
Williams	Gary Hart	Chad Hart	United States		
Whitler	Eldon "Whitey" Whitler	Smasher Sloan	United States		
Windham	Robert	Barry; Kendall	United States		
Wright	Steve	Alex	Germany		

=== Adopted, step and foster ===
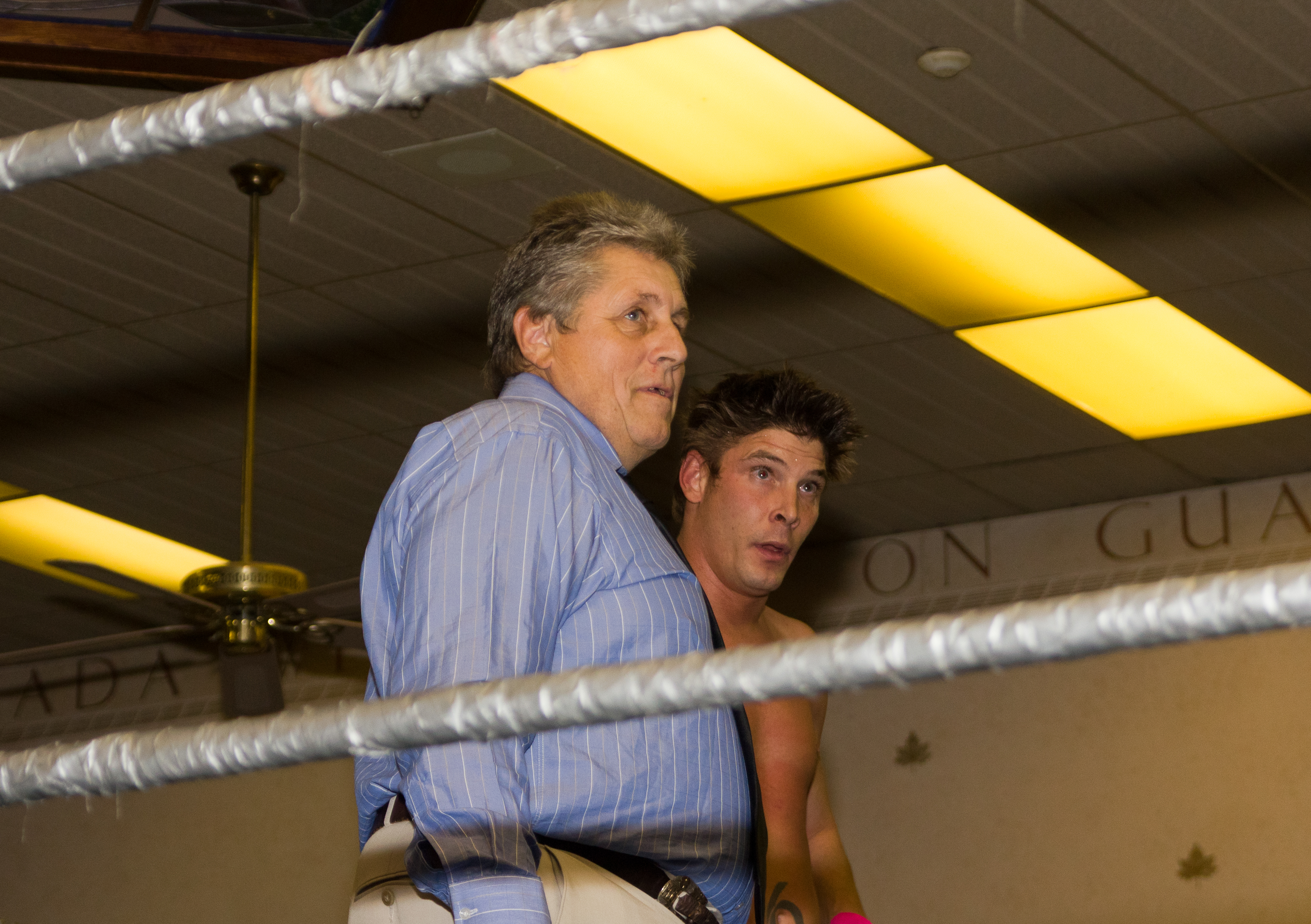
Smith Hart (left) with stepson Mike Hart (right)

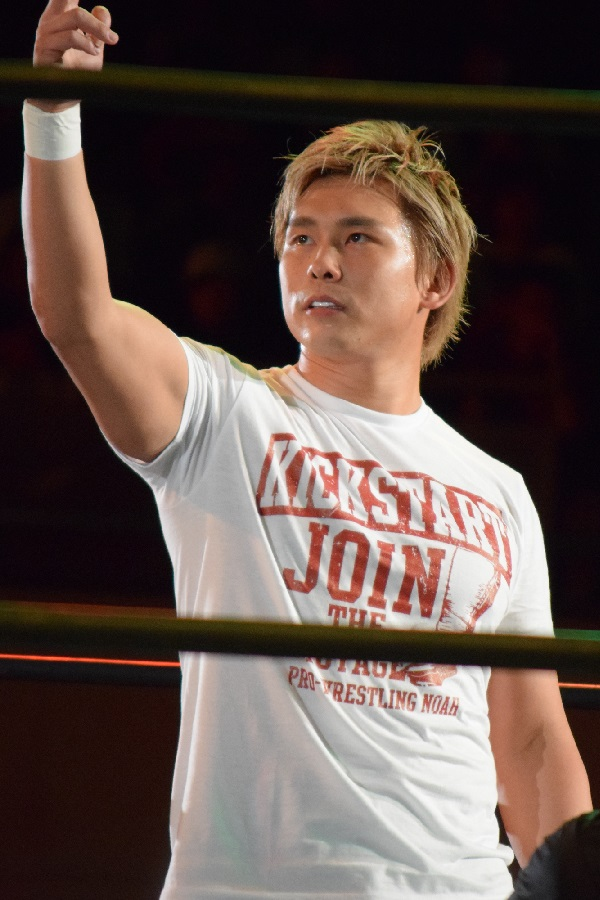
Katsuhiko Nakajima was adopted by Kensuke Sasaki and Akira Hokuto

Parent	Child(ren)	Country	Notes:	Ref(s)
Iron Mike DiBiase	Ted DiBiase	United States	Mike DiBiase married Ted's mother Helen Hild and later adopted him.	
Gorilla Monsoon	Joey Marella	United States		
Ron Garvin	Jimmy Garvin	Canada	Stepfather and stepson. They were billed as kayfabe brothers with Terry Garvin	
Dave McKigney	Rachel Dubois	Canada		
Brian Pillman	Lexi Pillman	United States		
Smith Hart	Mike Hart	Canada United States	Stepfather and stepson	
Kensuke Sasaki	Katsuhiko Nakajima	Japan	Adopted	
Akira Hokuto	Katsuhiko Nakajima	Japan	Adopted	
Paul Vachon	Luna Vachon	Canada	Stepfather and stepdaughter	
Tonga Fifita	Hikuleo; Tama Tonga	United States	Tonga Fifita was their maternal aunt's husband, and adopted them together with her when they were young.	
Blue Demon	Blue Demon Jr.	Mexico		
Octavio Gaona	Francisco Ruiz Arreola	Mexico		
Diamond Dallas Page	Lexy Nair	United States	Page was married to Nair's mother between 2015 and 2020	

== Grandparent–grandchildren ==
=== Biological ===
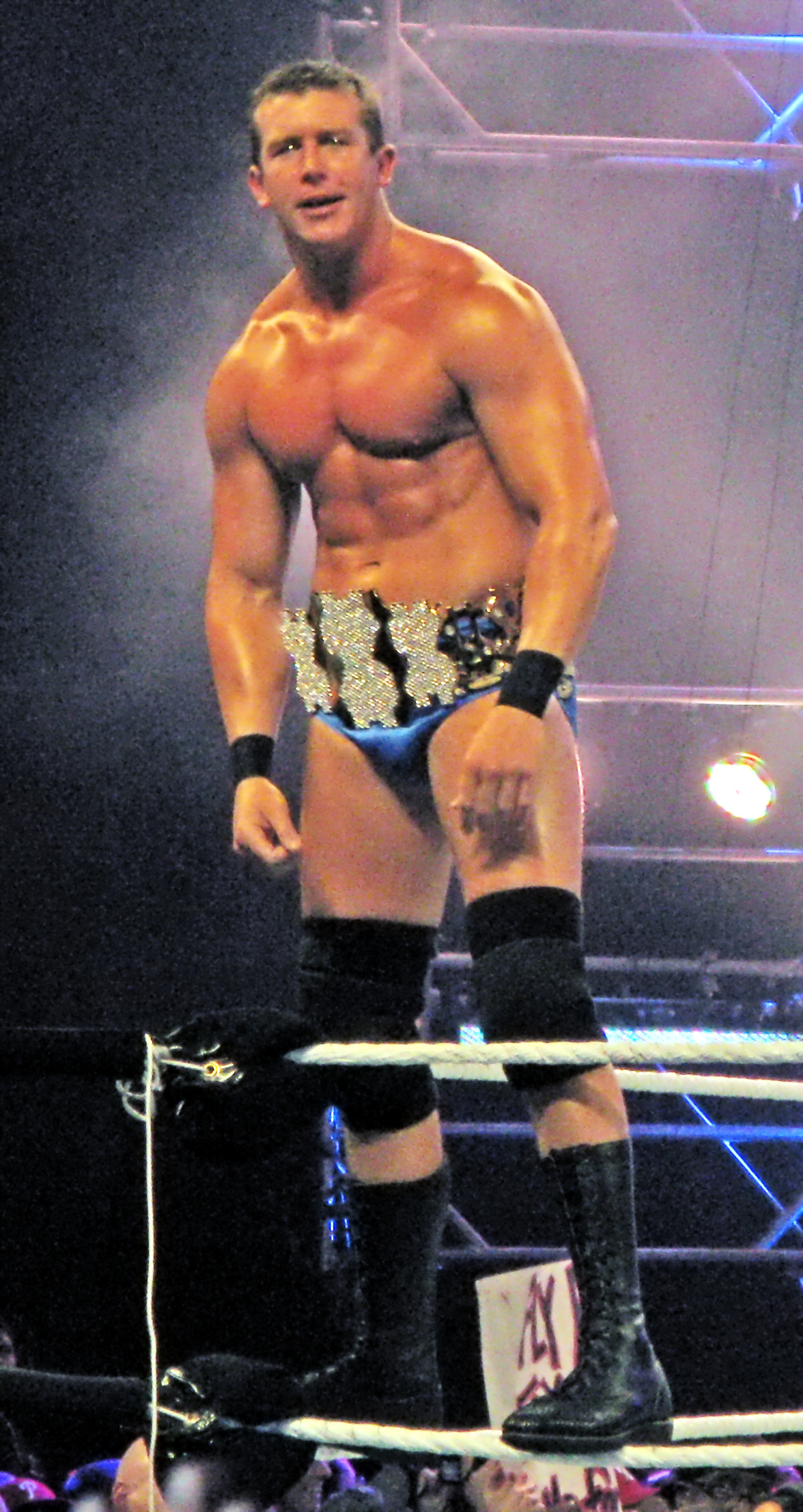
Ted DiBiase Jr. is the grandson of former wrestler Helen Hild. DiBiase is shown here with the Million Dollar Championship, a title created by his father Ted DiBiase, which was awarded to him in April 2010

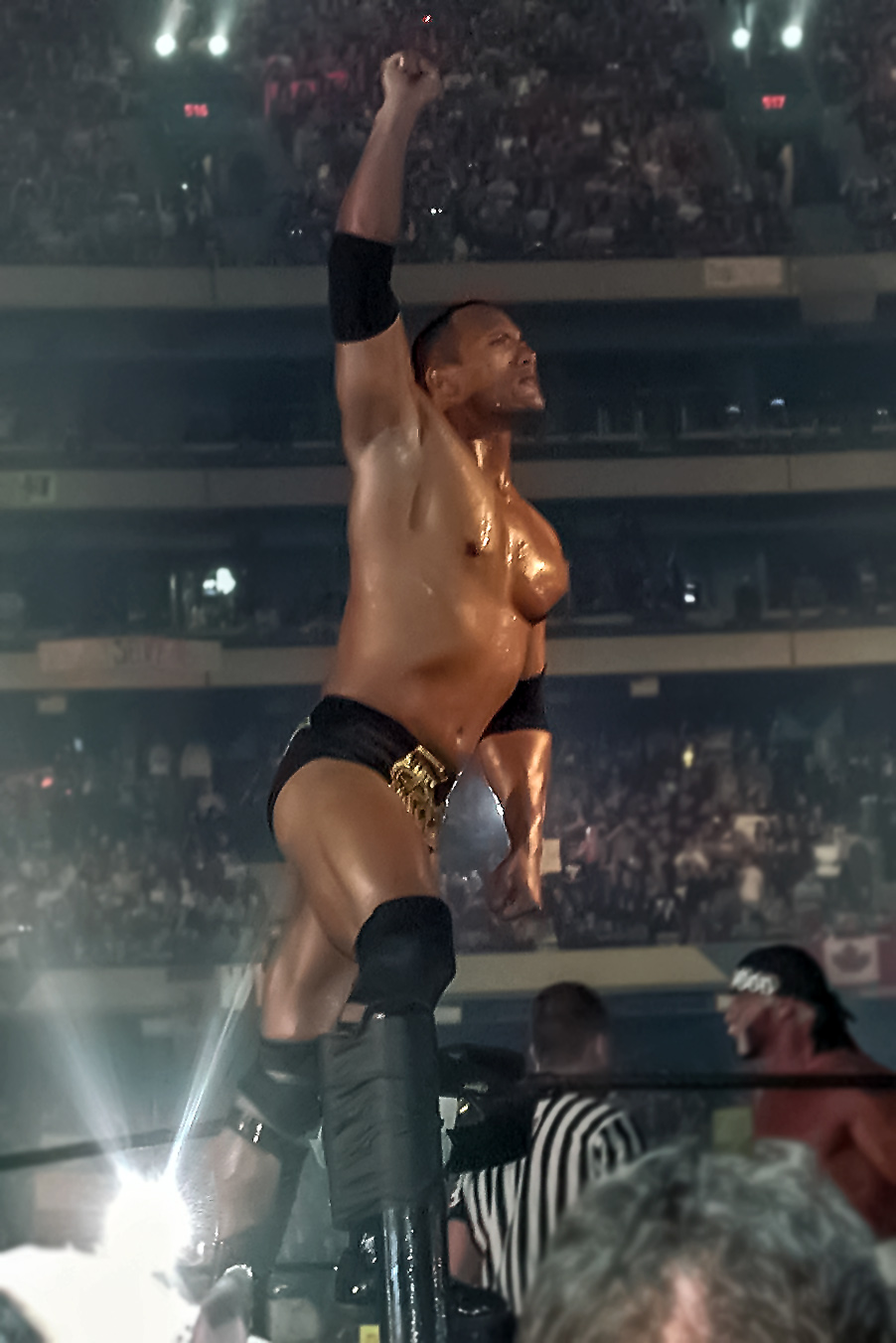
Dwayne "The Rock" Johnson, pictured here at WrestleMania X8, is the son of Rocky Johnson and grandson of promoter Lia Maivia

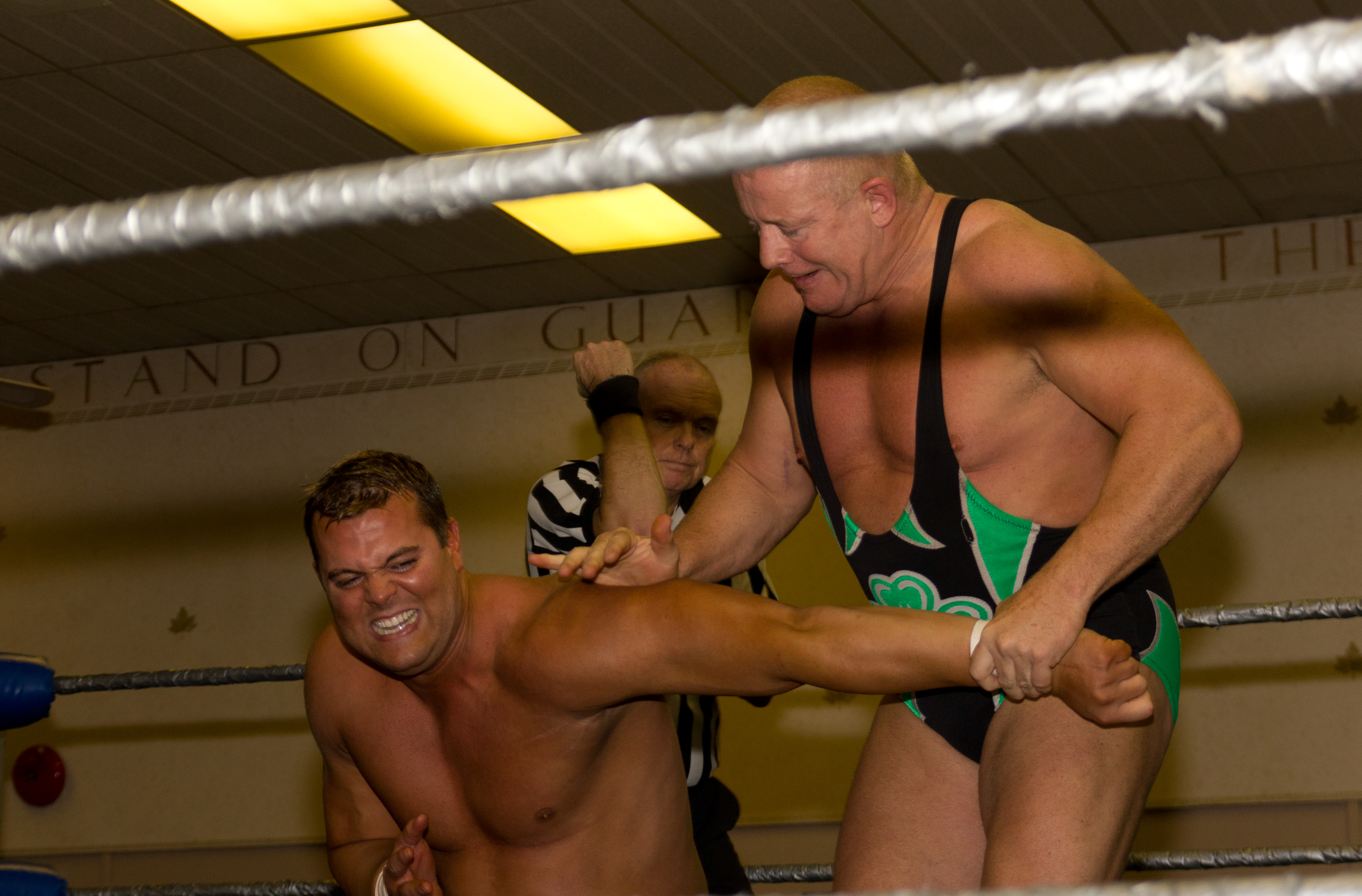
Harry Smith (left) and Fit Finlay (right) both have grandparents in wrestling. Smith being the maternal grandson of a wrestler (Stu) and his promoter wife (Helen). With Finlay both his paternal and maternal grandfathers were wrestlers.

Grandparent	Grandchild(ren)	Country	Note(s)	Ref(s)
Al Amezcua	Apolo Dantés; Cesar Dantés; Septiembre Negro Jr.	Mexico		
Ángel Blanco	Horus	Mexico		
Bull Curry	Fred Curry Jr.	United States		
Hurricane Castillo Sr.	AJ Castillo	Cuba Puerto Rico		
Helen Hild	Mike DiBiase; Ted DiBiase Jr. Brett DiBiase	United States	Their father was step son of wrestler Michael DiBiase	
Humberto Garza	Angel; Humberto	Mexico		
Gory Guerrero	Chavo Guerrero Jr. Shaul Guerrero	Mexico		
Santo	Axel; Santo Jr.	Mexico		
Stu Hart	David Hart Smith; Teddy Hart; Matthew Annis; Nattie Neidhart; Matt Hart; Bruce Hart Jr. Torrin Hart; Lindsay Hart	Canada United States		
Helen Hart	David Hart Smith; Teddy Hart; Matthew Annis; Nattie Neidhart; Matt Hart; Bruce Hart Jr. Torrin Hart; Lindsay Hart	United States Canada		
Lia Maivia	Dwayne Johnson	Canada United States		
Larry Hennig	Joe Hennig; Amy Hennig	United States		
Eddie Marlin	Jeff Jarrett	United States		
Leroy McGuirk	Max McGuirk	United States		
Jess McMahon	Vince McMahon Jr.	United States		
Vince McMahon, Sr.	Shane McMahon; Stephanie McMahon	United States		
Blackjack Mulligan	Windham Rotunda; Taylor Rotunda	United States		
Frankie Hill Murdoch	Ricky Murdoch	United States		
Bob Orton Sr.	Randy Orton	United States		
Miguel Pérez Sr.	Nathalya Pérez	Puerto Rico		
Salvador Pérez Sr.	Mike Mendoza	El Salvador Puerto Rico		
Chuck Richards	Chris Candido	United States		
Rikidozan	Chikara	North Korea/Japan	Rikidozan was born in Japanese Korea	
John Robinson	Joe Robinson	United Kingdom		
Fritz Von Erich	Lacey Von Erich; Marshall Von Erich; Ross Von Erich	United States		
Buddy Wayne	Eric Wayne	United States		
Roy Welch	Robert Fuller; Ron Fuller; Jimmy Golden	United States		

=== Adopted, step and foster ===
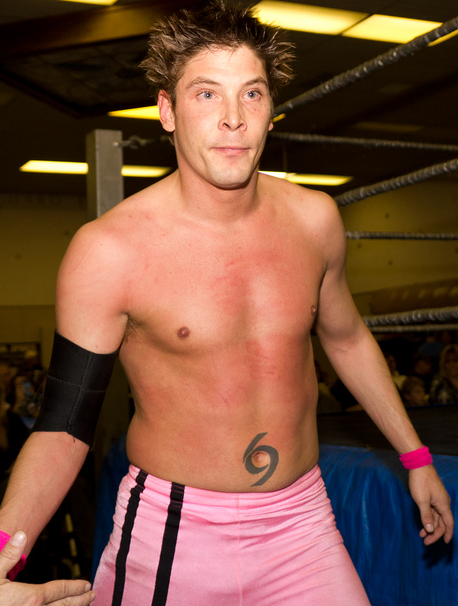
Mike Hart is Stu and Helen Hart's step-grandon

Grandparent	Grandchild(ren)	Country	Notes	Ref(s)
Michael DiBiase	Mike DiBiase; Ted DiBiase Jr. Brett DiBiase	United States	Michael DiBiase married Helen Hild, Ted, Mike and Brett's father's mother.	
Peter Maivia	Dwayne Johnson	American Samoa United States	Peter Maivia married Lia Maivia, the mother of Dwayne Johnson's mother.	
Stu Hart	Mike Hart	Canada	Mike's mother married Smith Hart, Stu's son.	
Helen Hart	Mike Hart	Canada	Mike's mother married Smith Hart, Helen's son.	

== Great grandparent–great grandchildren ==
=== Biological ===
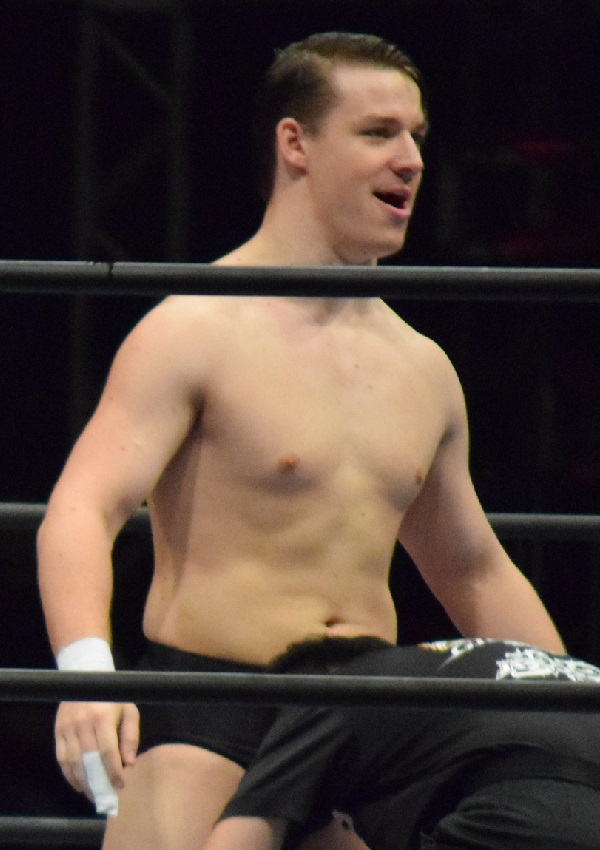
Both of David Finlay's paternal great-grandfathers were wrestlers.

Great-grandparent	Great-grandchild(ren)	Country	Note(s)	Ref(s)
Jess McMahon	Shane McMahon; Stephanie McMahon	United States		
Roy Welch	Bobby Golden; Eddie Golden	United States		
Dory Funk	Dory Funk IV	United States		
William John Finlay	David Finlay	Ulster Germany		
John Douglas Liddell	David Finlay	Ulster Germany		
Shiv Charan Goho	Ram Charan Goho	India		
Abhay Charan Goho	Jatindra Charan Guho	India		

== Aunts and uncles–niblings ==
=== Regular ===
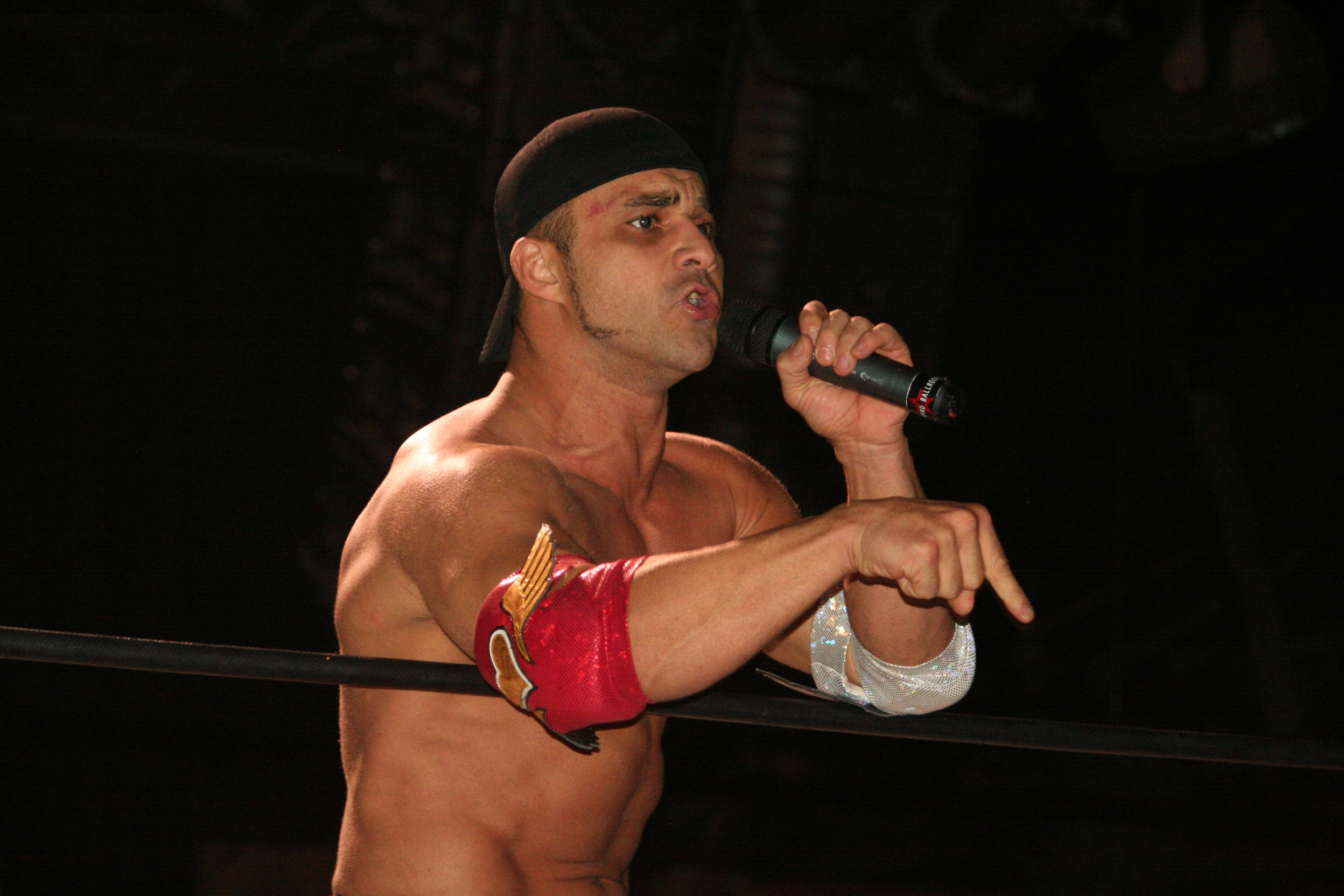
Teddy Hart is the son of wrestler B. J. Annis and Georgia Hart the daughter of wrestler Stu Hart and promoter Helen Hart, making him the nephew of all Georgias eight wrestler brothers and three sisters.

Ommer	Nibling	Country	Note(s)	Ref(s)
Afa Anoaʻi; Sika Anoaʻi	Reno Anoaʻi; Rodney Anoa'i; Sam Fatu; Eddie Fatu; Solafa Fatu Jr.	American Samoa, United States	Yokozuna was billed as Sika's kayfabe son	
Rosey; Joe Anoa'i (Roman Reigns)	Jonathan (Jimmy); Joshua (Jey); Joseph (Solo Sikoa)	United States	Despite being uncle-niblings, Joe, Jonathan and Joshua were born in the same year (1985) and have called each other "cousin" on TV. This uncle-nibling family bond has been portrayed on WWE TV with The Bloodline stable.	
The Barbarian	Lei'D Tapa	United States		
Jack Brisco	Wes Brisco	United States		
Bob Brown	Kerry Brown	United States	Billed as kayfabe son	
Édouard Carpentier	Jackie Wiecz	Canada	Billed as kayfabe son	
Ted and Vic Christy	Bobby and Jerry Colt	United States		
Carlos Colón	Orlando Colón	Puerto Rico		
Dos Caras, Mil Mascaras	Sicodelico Jr.	Mexico		
Mil Mascaras; Sicodelico Sr.	Alberto Del Rio	Mexico		
Espanto I	Espanto IV, Espanto V	Mexico		
El Espectro	El Espectro Jr. Cadaver de Ultrarumba; Guerrero de la Muerte	Mexico		
Chick Garibaldi	Leo Garibaldi	United States		
Hulk Hogan	Horace Boulder	United States		
Johnny Ibarra; El Desalmado	Volador Jr.	Mexico		
Karloff Lagarde	Karloff Lagarde Jr.	Mexico	Billed as kayfabe son	
Rey Misterio	Rey Misterio Jr.	Mexico	Never billed as father and son despite the name. Rey Jr. was born in the San Diego area in the U.S., he began his wrestling career in Mexico	
Jet Monroe	Bubba Monroe	United States		
Ted Oates	Bo Oates	United States		
Rip Oliver	Earl Oliver	United States	Earl Oliver, although not a professional wrestler, is the founder of the oldest-existing pro wrestling website, Solie's Title Histories	
Ed Farhat	Sabu	United States		
Scott Steiner	Bron Breakker	United States		
Frank Tunney	Jack Tunney	Canada		
Pirata Morgan; Verdugo; Hombre Bala	Rey Bucanero	Mexico		
Rolondo Vera	Alex Romano	Mexico		
Volador / Super Parka	La Parka; El Hijo de Cien Caras	Mexico		
Eddie Auger	Jean "Johnny" Rougeau; Jacques Rougeau Sr.	Canada		
"Dynamite Kid" Thomas Billington	Mark Billington; Tommy Billington	United Kingdom		

== Grandaunts and uncles–niblings ==
=== Regular ===
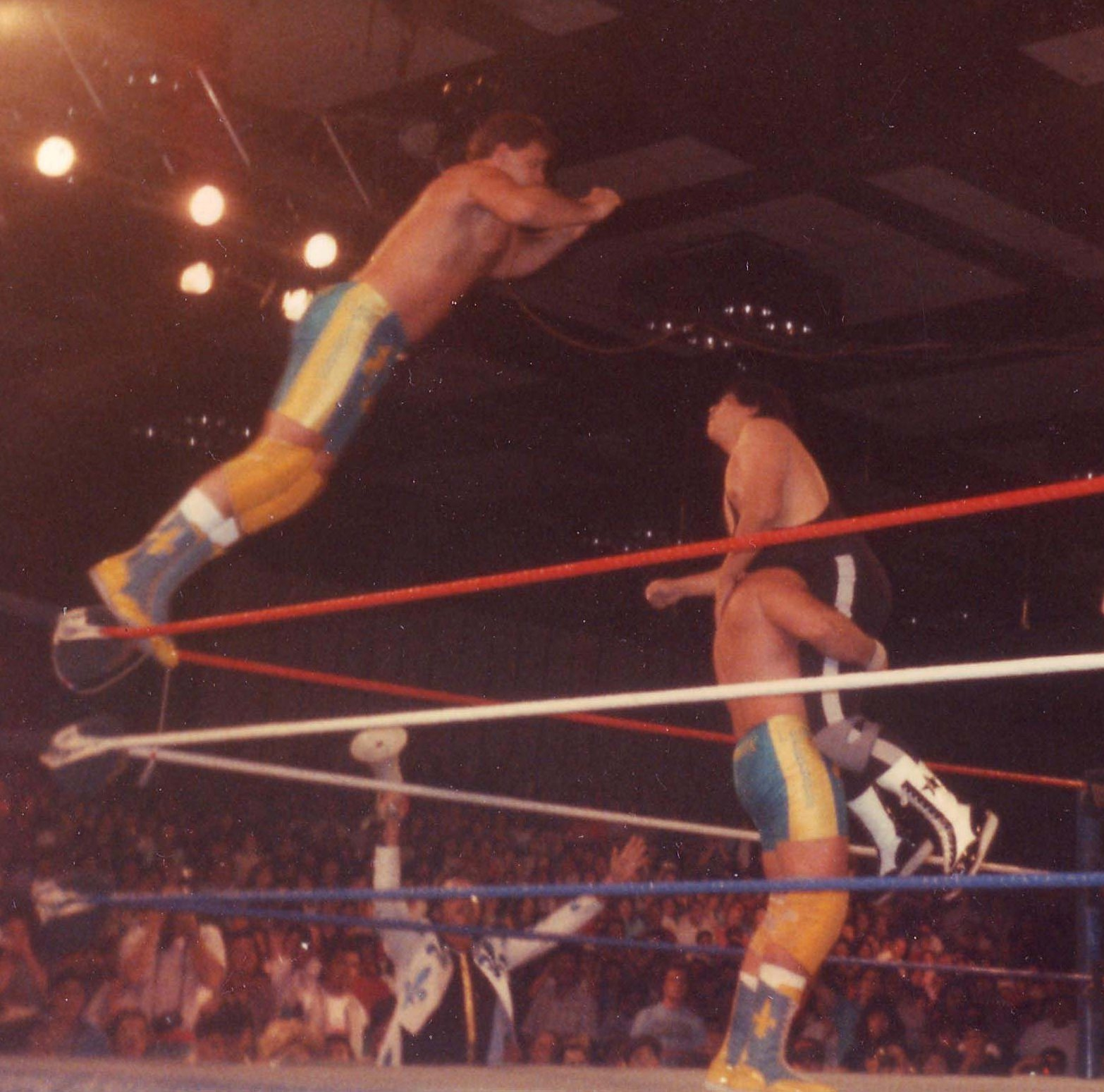
Brothers Jacques and Raymond Rougeau (blue and yellow trunks) are the grandnephews of Eddie Auger.

Grandommer	Nibling	Country	Note(s)	Ref(s)
Eddie Auger	Raymond Rougeau; Jacques Rougeau Jr. Armand Rougeau	Canada	Eddie was Raymond, Jacques and Armand's father's mother's brother See also: Rougeau family	
Rey Misterio (Sr.)	Dominik Mysterio	Mexico/United States	Rey Sr., born Miguel Ángel López Díaz, is the uncle of Dominik's father Óscar Gutiérrez, best known as Rey Mysterio (Jr.). Rey Sr. was born, raised, and spent his entire wrestling career in Mexico; Dominik, born and raised in the U.S., made his wrestling debut in 2020 in WWE.	

== Great-grandaunts and uncles–niblings ==
=== Regular ===
Great-grandommer	Nibling	Country	Note(s)	Ref(s)
Eddie Auger	Jean-Jacques Rougeau; Cedric Rougeau; Emile Rougeau	Canada	Eddie was Jean-Jacques, Cedric and Emile's father's father's mother's brother See also: Rougeau family	

== First cousins ==
=== Regular ===
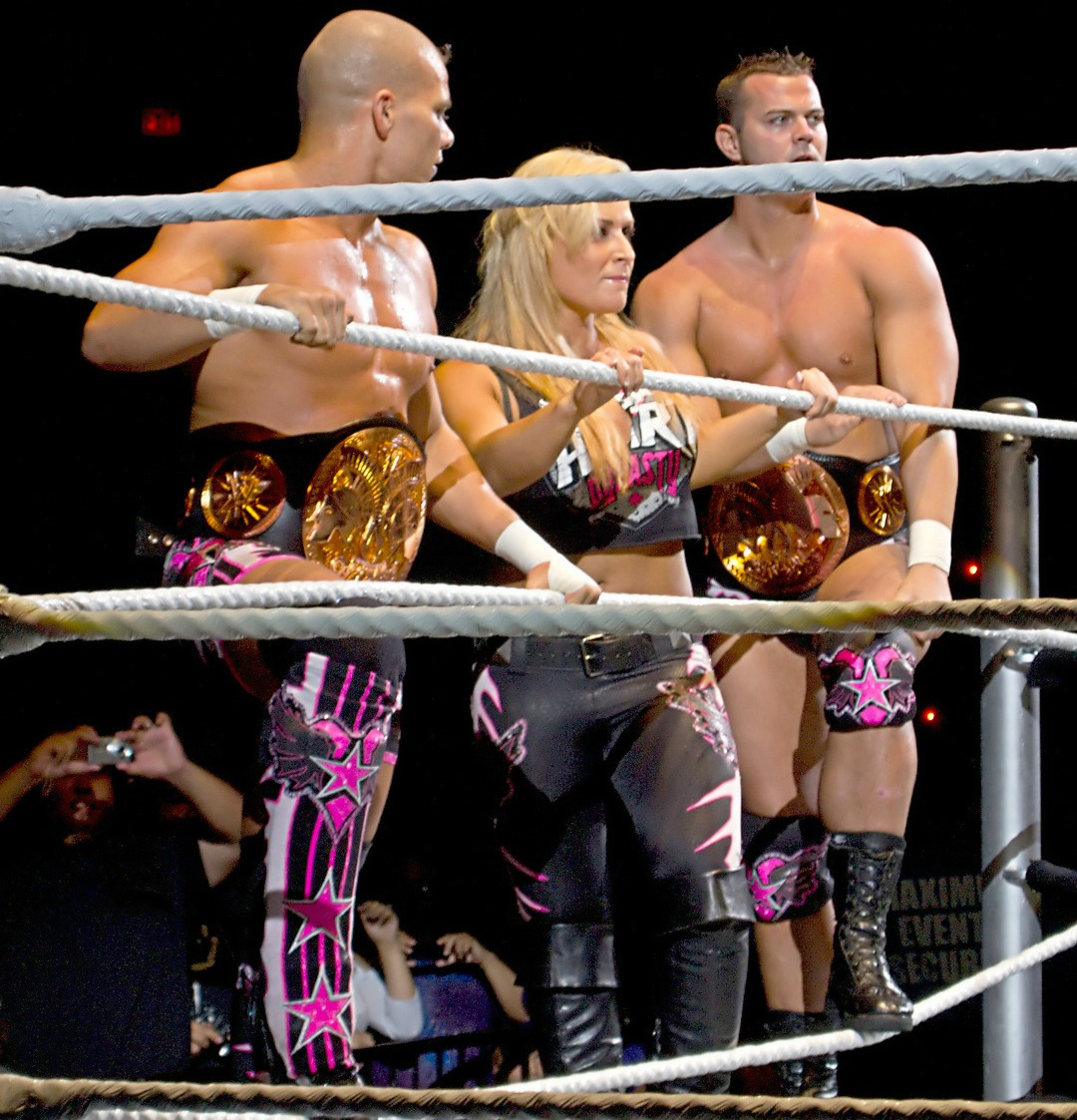
Cousins Harry Smith and Natalya Neidhart with her then boyfriend (now husband) Tyson Kidd, collectively known as The Hart Dynasty (from right to left), as the WWE Tag Team Champions in August 2010

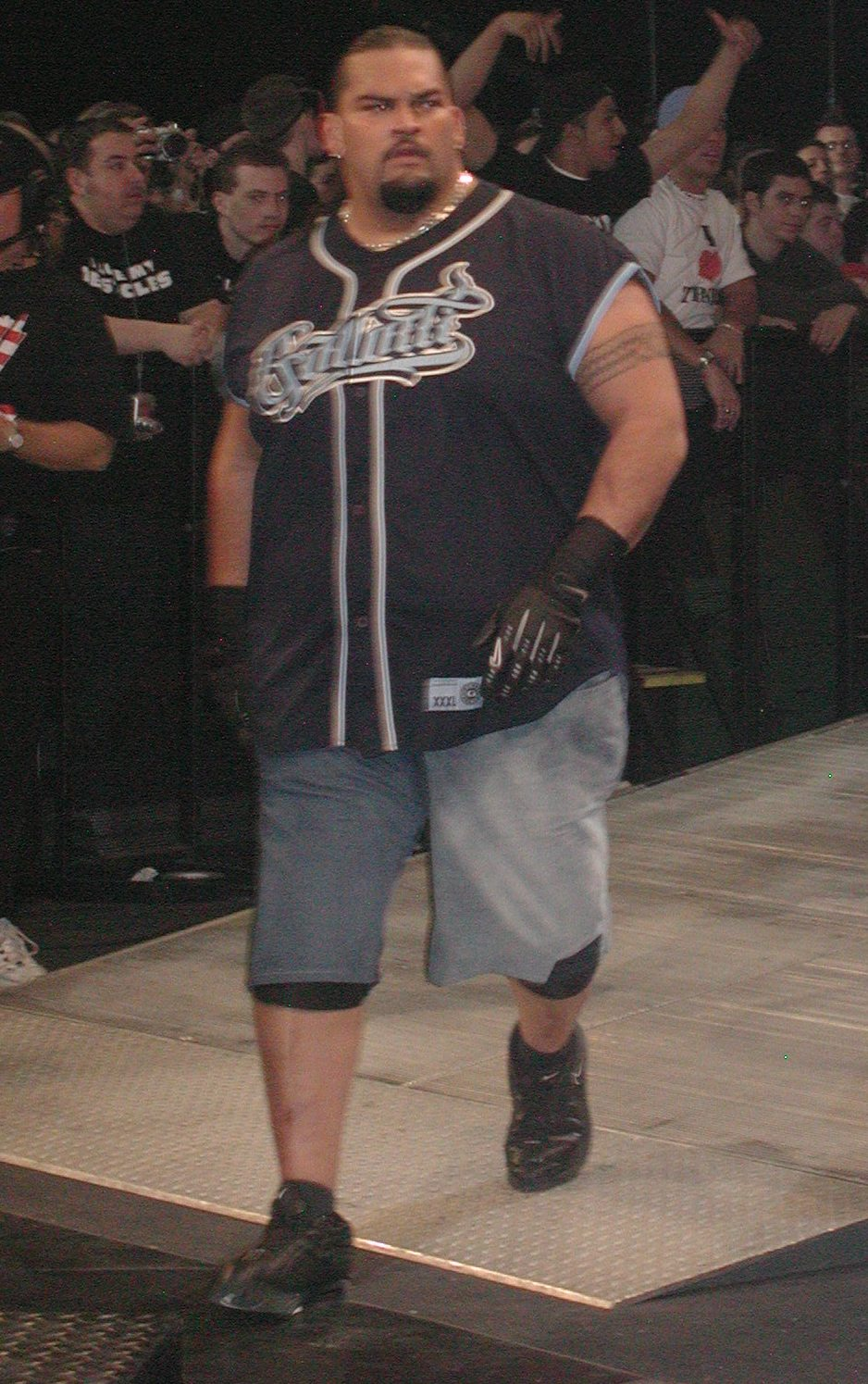
Matt Anoa'i was teammates with his cousin Eddie Fatu on Three Minute Warning

Cousin(s)	Cousin(s)	Cousin(s)	Cousin(s)	Cousin(s)	Cousin(s)	Country	Note(s)	Ref(s)
Harry Smith	Teddy Hart; Matthew Annis	Natalie Neidhart	Matt Hart	Torrin Hart; Bruce Hart Jr.	Lindsay Hart	Canada	See also: Hart wrestling family See also: Hart Dynasty	
Tama Tonga; Hikuleo	Tanga Loa					United States		
Bad Luck Fale	Tanga Loa							
Jimmy Uso; Jey Uso; Solo Sikoa	Jacob Fatu	Zilla Fatu				United States		
Alberto Del Rio; El Hijo de Dos Caras	Sicodelico Jr.					Mexico	Alberto Del Rio, also known as Alberto el Patrón and born José Alberto Rodríguez Chucuan, was the first wrestler to perform as El Hijo de Dos Caras. The current El Hijo de Dos Caras, known as Memo Montenegro during a brief stint in WWE NXT, was born Guillermo Rodríguez Chucuan.	
Bill Alfonso	David Sierra					United States		
Amazing Red	Jose Maximo; Joel Maximo					United States		
Mike Awesome	Horace Hogan	¨				United States		
Mikey Batts	Billy Kidman					United States		
Jonathan Boyd	Norman Frederick Charles III					Australia	See also: The Royal Kangaroos	
Primo	Epico					Puerto Rico	See also: Primo and Epico	
Killer Brooks	Dick Murdoch					United States		
Chris Chetti	Taz					United States		
Davey Boy Smith	"Dynamite Kid" Thomas Billington					United Kingdom	See also: Hart wrestling family	
Bronwyne Billington	Mark Billington; Tommy Billington					United Kingdom	See also: Hart wrestling family	
Hijo del Espectro; El Picudo	El Espectro Jr. Cadaver de Ultrarumba; Guerrero de la Muerte					Mexico		
Angel Garza	Humberto Carrillo; El Sultan					Mexico		
Jerry Lawler	The Honky Tonk Man					United States		
Brian Lee	Ron and Don Harris					United States		
The Undertaker	Brian Lee					United States		
Ricky Morton	Todd Morton					United States		
Michael Hickenbottom	Matt Bentley					United States		
Jose Rivera	Victor Rivera					Puerto Rico		
Al Perez	Lou Perez					United States	Billed as kayfabe brothers	
Johnny Rich	Tommy Rich					United States	Billed as kayfabe brothers	

=== Adopted, step and foster ===
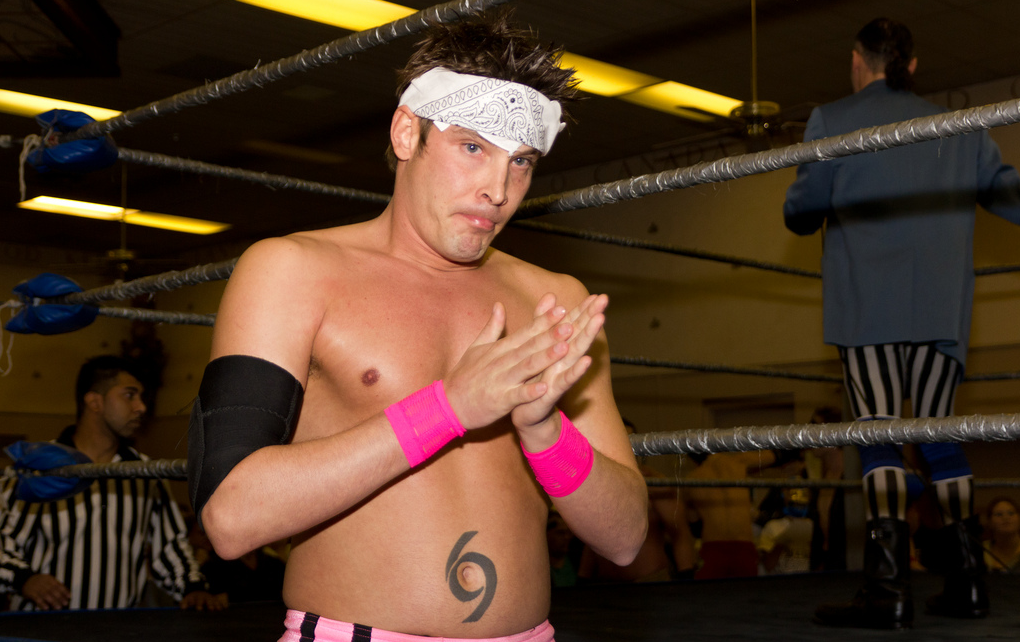
Mike Hart has many step-cousins in wrestling.

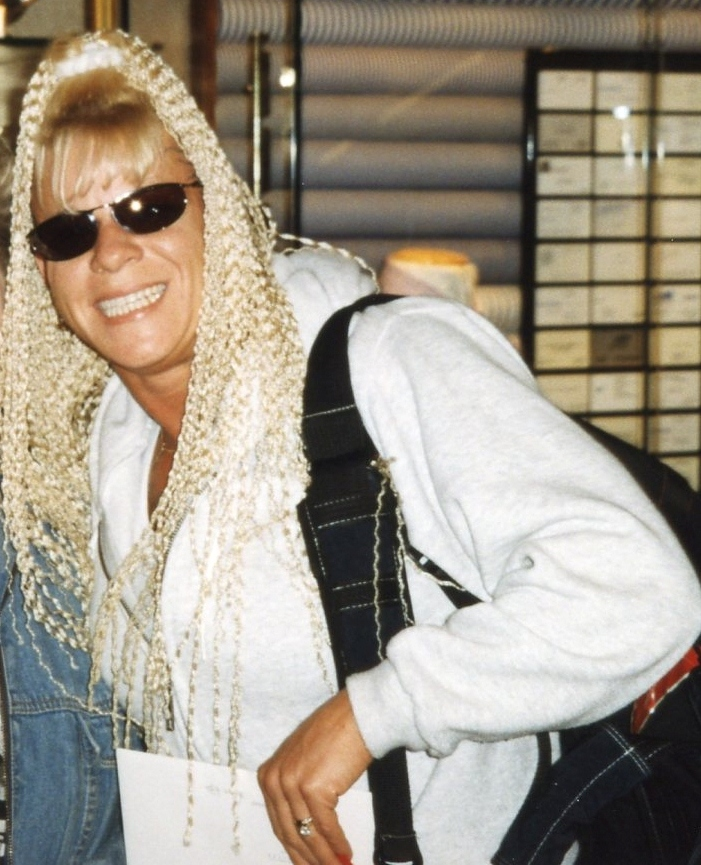
Luna Vachon is the step-cousin of Ian Carnegie

Cousin(s)	Step/adopted/foster cousin(s)	Country	Note(s)	Ref(s)
David Hart Smith; Teddy Hart; Matthew Annis; Natalie Neidhart; Torrin Hart; Bruce Hart Jr. Lindsay Hart	Mike Hart	Canada	See also: Hart wrestling family	
Ian Carnegie	Luna Vachon	Canada	See also: Vachon family	
Hikuleo; Tama Tonga	Bad Luck Fale	United States		

== First cousins once removed ==
=== Regular ===
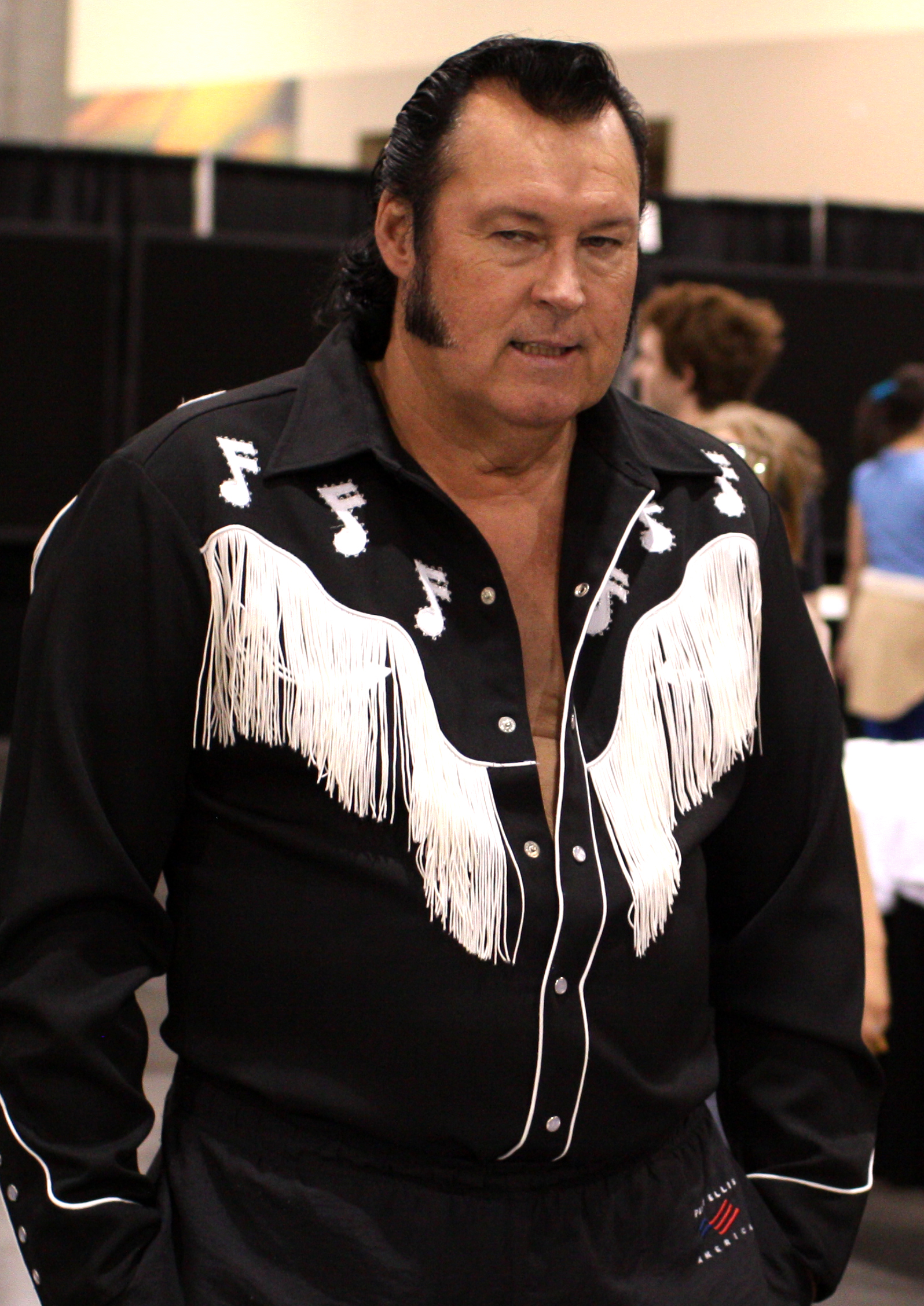
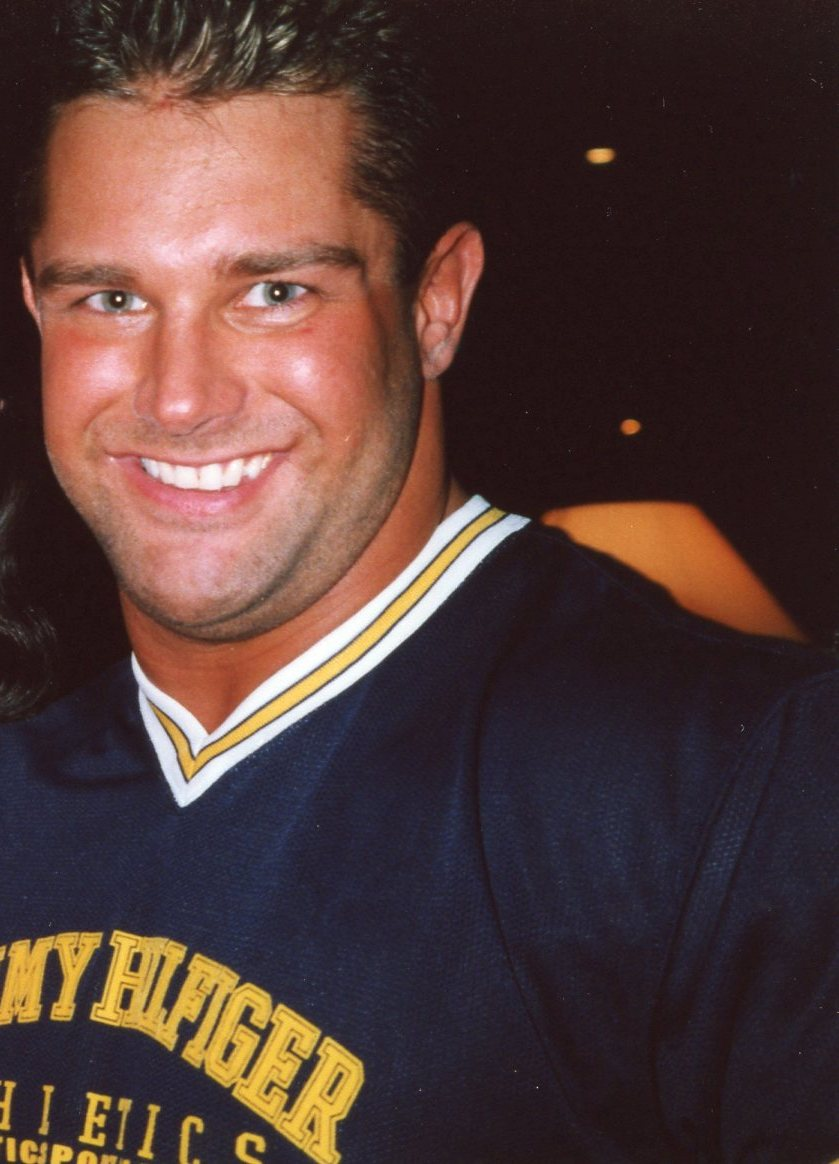
Wayne Farris and Brian Lawler

Elder generation	Next generation	Country	Note(s)	Ref(s)
The Honky Tonk Man	Brian Christopher; Kevin Christian	United States	Brian and Kevin's father's mother and Wayne Farris' mother were sisters	
Stu Hart	Roderick Toombs	Canada		
Roman Reigns	Jimmy Uso; Jey Uso; Lance Anoa'i; Solo Sikoa	United States		
Rosey	Jimmy Uso; Jey Uso; Lance Anoa'i; Solo Sikoa	United States		
Yokozuna	Jimmy Uso; Jey Uso; Lance Anoa'i; Solo Sikoa	United States		
"Dynamite Kid" Thomas Billington	Harry Smith	Canada Great Britain		
Davey Boy Smith	Bronwyne Billington; Tommy Billington; Mark Billington	Canada Great Britain		

=== Adopted, step and foster ===
Elder generation	Next generation	Country	Note(s)	Ref(s)
		[[|]]		

== Second cousins ==
=== Regular ===
Cousin(s)	Cousin(s)	Country	Note(s)	Ref(s)
Harry Smith	Bronwyne Billington	Canada		
Tommy Billington; Mark Billington	Harry Smith	Canada		
Roderick Toombs	Smith Hart; Bruce Hart; Keith Hart; Wayne Hart; Dean Hart; Ellie Hart; Georgia Hart; Bret Hart; Alison Hart; Ross Hart; Diana Hart; Owen Hart	Canada		
Humberto Carrillo	Angel Garza	Mexico		

== Second cousins once removed ==
=== Regular ===
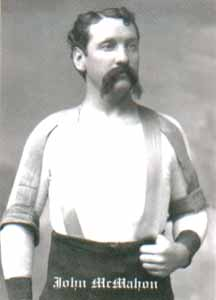
John McMahon was the second cousin once removed to James Owen who he wrestled

Elder generation	Next generation	Country	Note(s)	Ref(s)
John McMahon	James Owen	United States		
Roderick Toombs	David Hart Smith; Teddy Hart; Matthew Annis; Nattie Neidhart; Matt Hart; Bruce Hart Jr. Torrin Hart; Lindsay Hart	Canada		
Smith Hart; Bruce Hart; Keith Hart; Wayne Hart; Dean Hart; Ellie Hart; Georgia Hart; Bret Hart; Alison Hart; Ross Hart; Diana Hart; Owen Hart	Colt Toombs; Ariel Toombs	Canada		

=== Adopted, step and foster ===
Elder generation	Next generation	Country	Note(s)	Ref(s)
Roderick Toombs	Mike Hart	Canada		

== Second cousins twice removed ==
=== Regular ===
Cousin(s)	style="width:160px;"|Cousin(s)	style="width:125px;"|Country	Note(s)	Ref(s)
B-Fab	Je'Von Evans	United States		

== Marriages ==
=== Regular ===
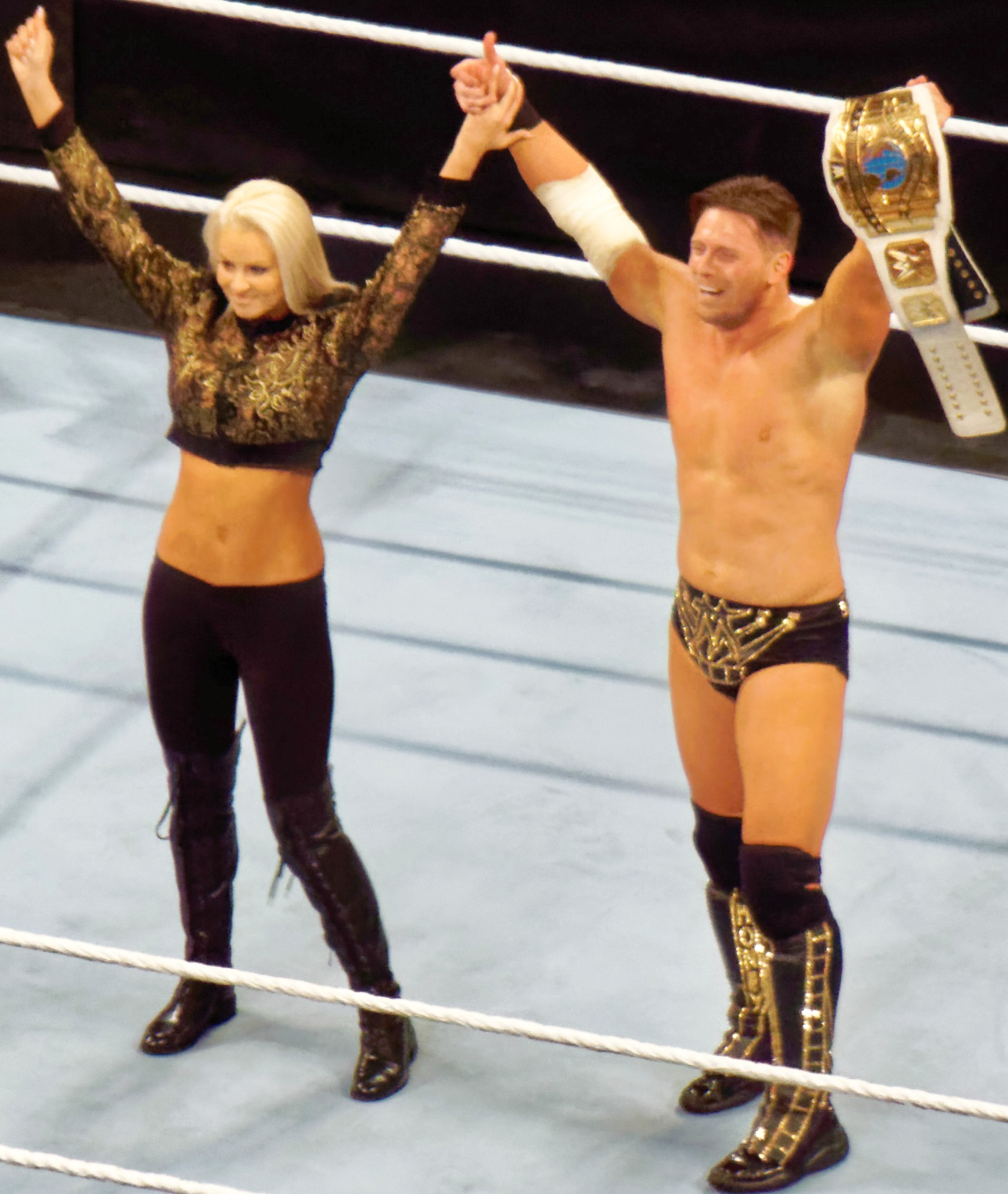
Maryse (left) and The Miz (right) celebrating Miz victory over the WWE Intercontinental Championship at a Raw event in April 2016

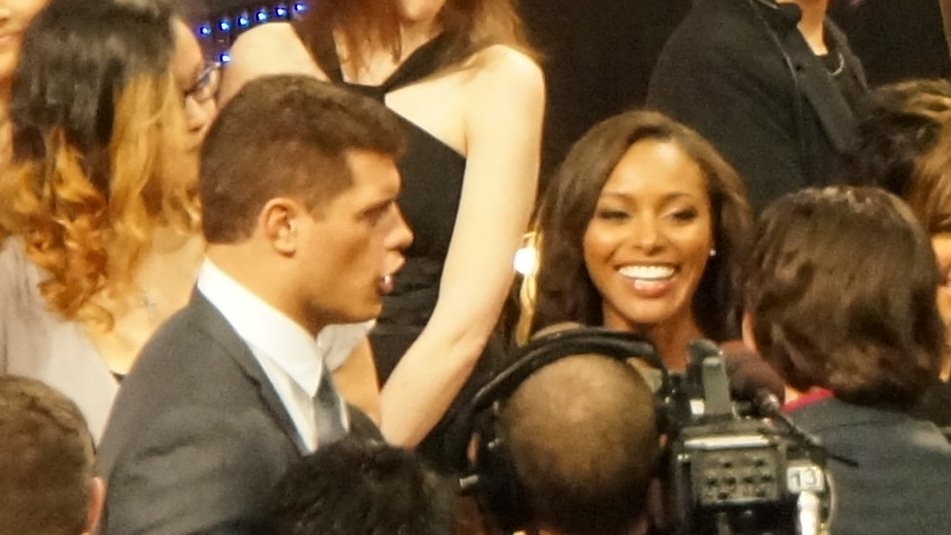
Cody Rhodes (left) and Brandi Reed (right) in April 2014

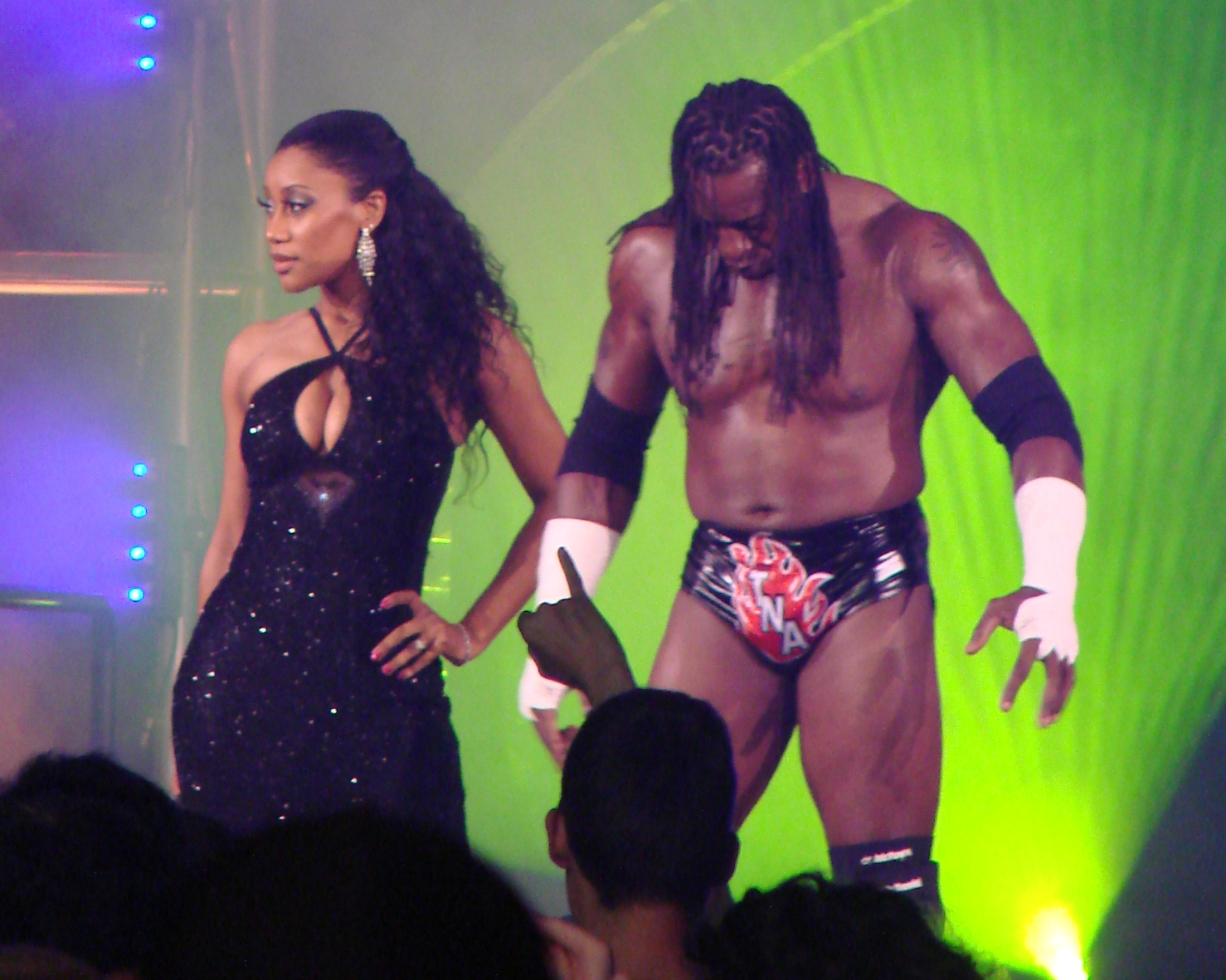
Booker T (right) and Sharmell (left) in 2008

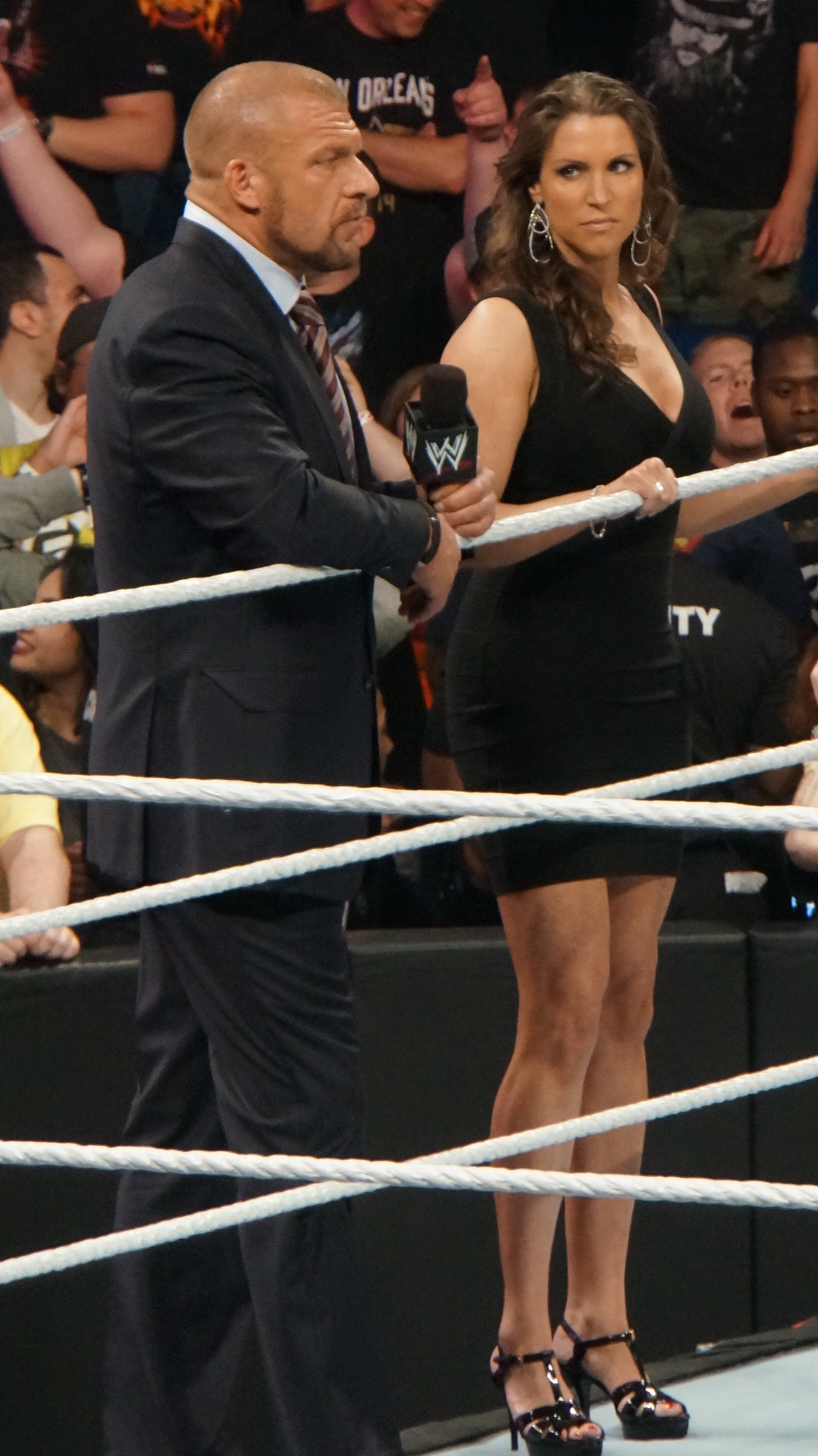
Triple H (left) and Stephanie McMahon (right) in 2014

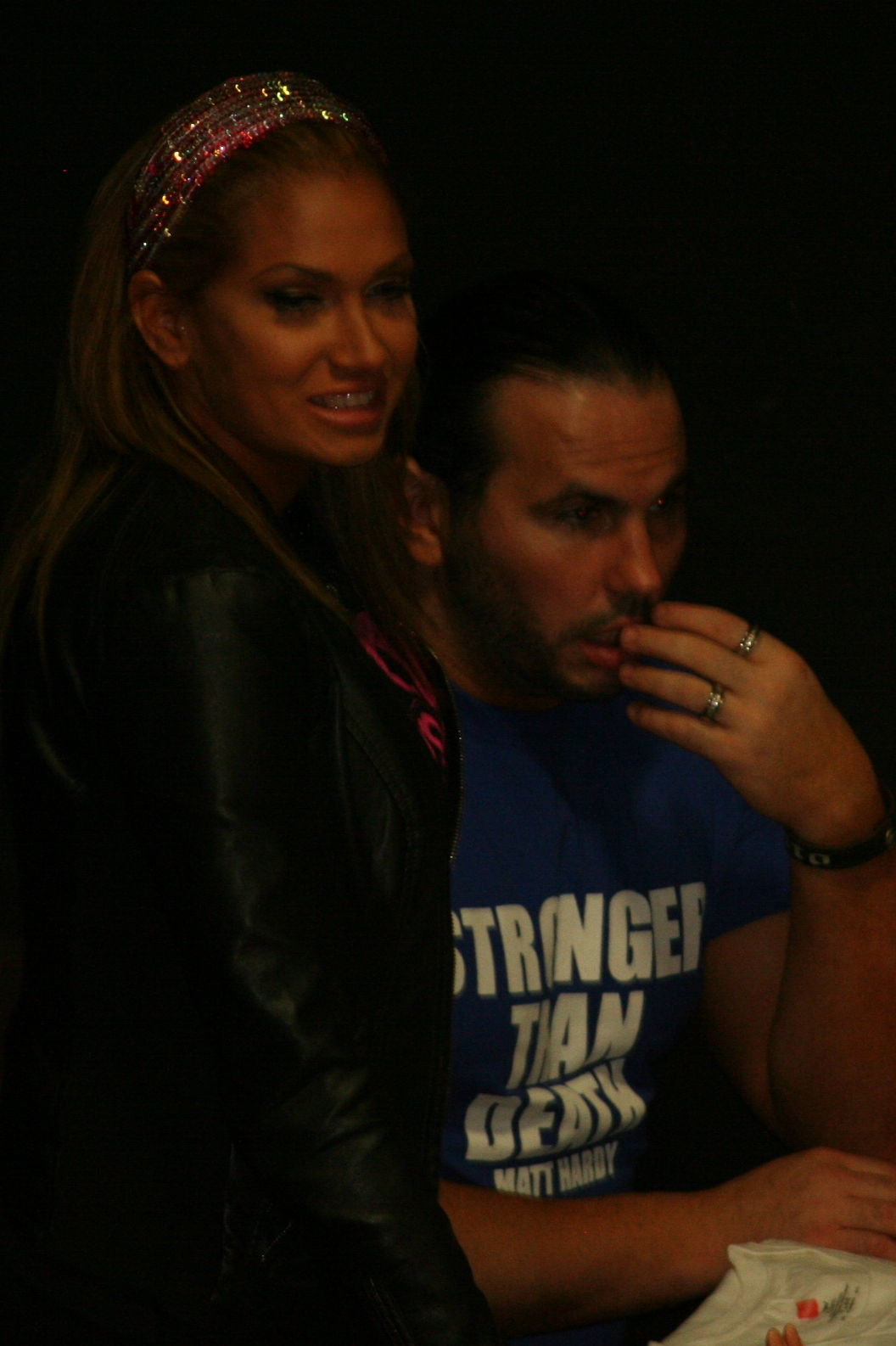
Matt Hardy and Reby Sky in February 2014

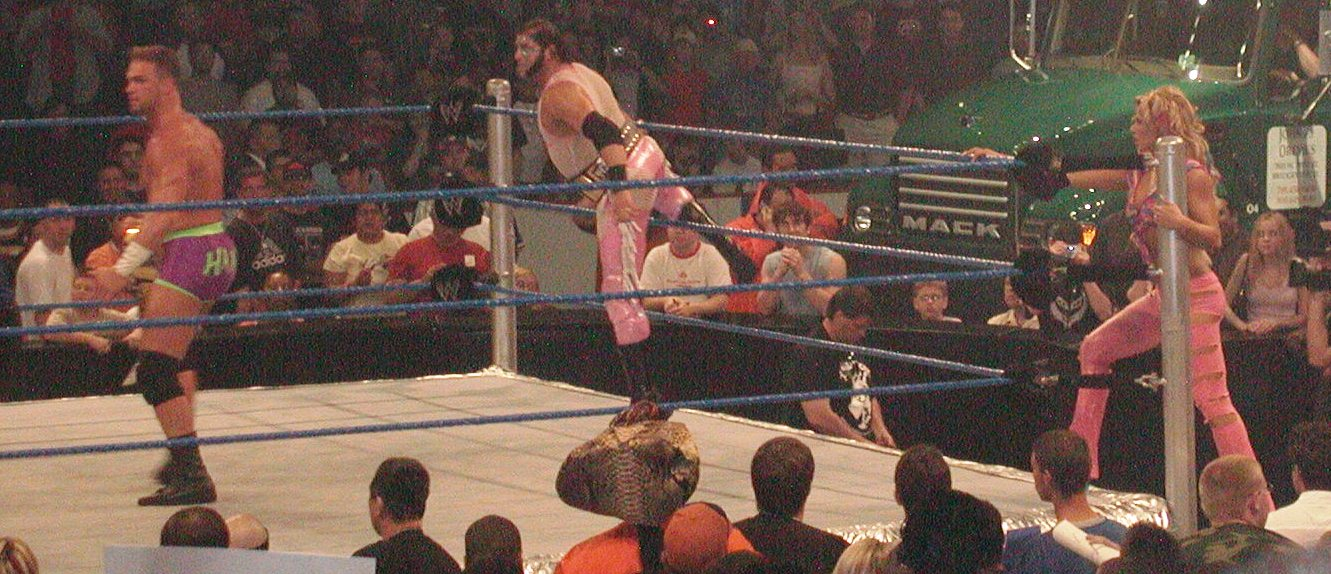
Charlie Hass (left) and Jackie Gayda (right), pictured with tag team partner Rico Constantino (center) at the Allstate Arena, have been married since 2005

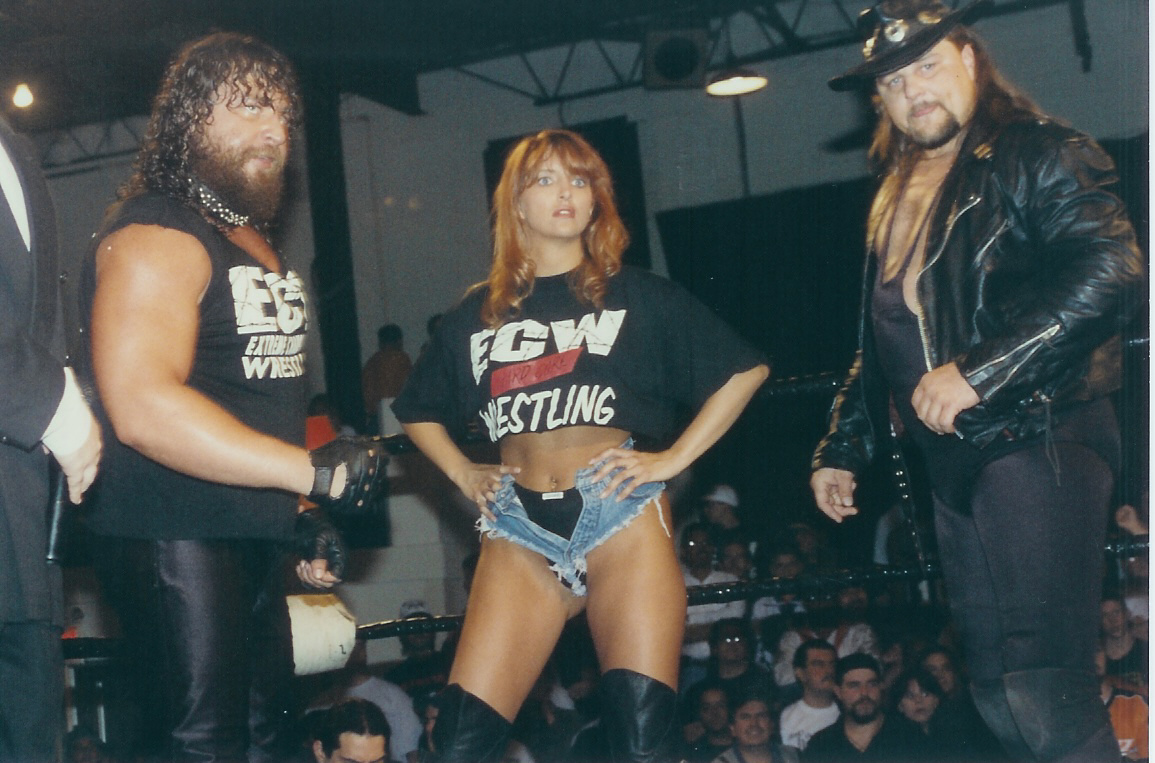
Damien Kane (left) and Lady Alexandra (center) with another wrestler in ECW, c. 1996

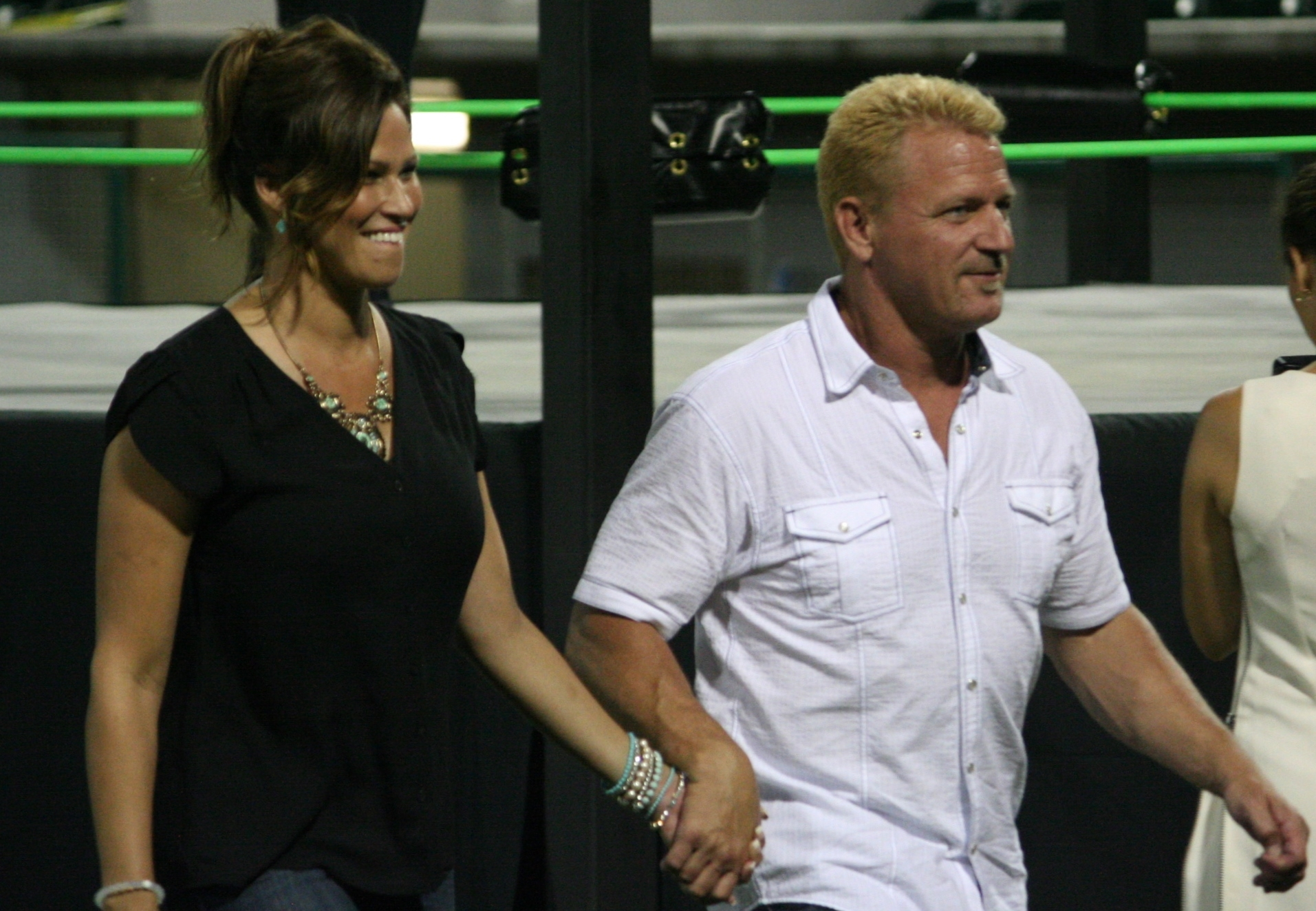
Karen and Jeff Jarrett, Karen was previously married to Kurt Angle

Husband	Wife	Years	Notes
(United Kingdom) Chris Adams	(United States) Toni Adams	1984–1994	Divorced
(United States) Tony Anthony	(United States) Kimberly Anthony		Divorced
(United States) Steve Austin	(United Kingdom) Lady Blossom	1992–1999	Divorced
(United States) Steve Austin	(United States) Debra Marshall	2000–2003	Divorced
(United States) George Becker	(United States) Joyce Grable	1968–1999	Widowed
(Canada) Chris Benoit	(United States) Nancy Benoit	2000–2007	Both died in murder-suicide
(Canada) Brute Bernard	(United States) Betty Jo Hawkins	?-1984	Widowed
(United States) Booker T	(United States) Sharmell Sullivan	2005–	
(United Kingdom) Stevie Boy	(United Kingdom) Alba Fyre	2021–	
(United States) Dagon Briggs	(United States) Seven Briggs	2004–	
(United States) Paul Christy	(United States) Bunny Love	c. 1975–	Billed as "pro wrestling's Bonnie and Clyde", they become the first-ever husband and wife team to be honored by the Cauliflower Alley Club in 2005
(United States) Jim Cornette	(United States) Synn	2007–	
(France) Corsica Joe	(United States) Sarah Lee	1963–2008	Widowed
(Mexico) Daga	(United States) Tessa Blanchard	2020–2023	Divorced
(United States) Mike DiBiase	(United States) Helen Hild	1959–1969	Widowed
(United States) Tommy Dreamer	(United States) Beulah McGillicutty	2002–	
(Australia) Ryan Eagles	(Australia) Madison Eagles	2002–	
(United States) Aiden English	(United States) Raquel Diaz	2016–	
(Puerto Rico) Germán Figueroa	(Argentina) La Reina Havana	2005–	
(United States) Robert Fuller	(United States) Miss Sylvia	1971–2005	Divorced
(United States) Jimmy Garvin	(United States) Precious	1977–	
(United States) Doug Gilbert	(United States) Kay Noble	1969–?	Divorced
(United States) Eddie Gilbert	(United States) Missy Hyatt	1987–1990	Divorced
(United States) Eddie Gilbert	(United States) Madusa Miceli	1991	Divorced
(Japan) Tarzan Goto	(Greece) Despina Mantogas	1987–?	Divorced
(United States) Eddie Guerrero	(United States) Vickie Guerrero	1990–2005	Widowed
(United States) Charlie Haas	(United States) Jackie Gayda	2005–2020	Divorced
(United States) David Heath	(Canada) Luna Vachon	1994–2006	Divorced
(Japan) Hido	(Japan) Megumi Kudo	1998–	
(United States) Sam Houston	(United States) Baby Doll	1986–1994	Divorced
(Switzerland) Marco Jaggi	(Canada) Allison Danger	2008–	
(United States) Damien Kane	(United States) Lady Alexandra	c. 1988–	
(United States) Billy Kidman	(United States) Torrie Wilson	2003–2008	Divorced
(United States) Jerry Lawler	(United States) Stacy Carter	2000–2001	Divorced
(United States) Brock Lesnar	(United States) Sable	2006–	
(United States) Rodney Mack	(United States) Carlene Moore	c. 2000–	
(United States) Eric Maher	(United States) Alisha Inacio	2016–	
(United Kingdom) Drew McIntyre	(United States) Tiffany	2010–2011	Divorced
(United States) Shane McMahon	(United States) Marissa Mazzola-McMahon	1996–	
(United States) Vince McMahon	(United States) Linda McMahon	1966–	
(United States) Steve McMichael	(United States) Debra Marshall	1985–1998	Divorced
(United States) Sam Menacker	(United States) June Byers	1959-c. 1964	Divorced
(United States) Marc Mero	(United States) Sable	1992–2004	Divorced
(Canada) J.D. Michaels	(United States) April Hunter	2006–	
(United States) Shawn Michaels	(United States) Nitro Girl Whisper	1999–	
(United States) John Morrison	(Canada) Franky Monet	2018–	
(Japan) Tank Nagai	(Japan) Mio Shirai	2015–	
(United States) Tom Nash	(Canada) Luna Vachon	c. 1990–1992	Divorced
(United States) Diamond Dallas Page	(United States) Kimberly Page	1991–2005	Divorced
(United States) Joe Pedicino	(United States) Boni Blackstone	1990–	
(United States) Dustin Rhodes	(United States) Terri Runnels	1993–1999	Divorced
(United States) The Sandman	(United States) Peaches	c. 1986–	
(Japan) Kensuke Sasaki	(Japan) Akira Hokuto	1995–	
(Japan) Akio Sato	(United States) Betty Niccoli	1976–	
(United States) Randy Savage	(United States) Miss Elizabeth	1984–1992	Divorced
(Ecuador) Hugo Savinovich	(United States) Wendy Richter		Divorced
(United States) Eddie Sharkey	(United States) Princess Little Cloud	c. 1972–2000	
(United States) Ed Farhat "The Sheik"	(United States) Princess Salima	c. 1959–2003	Widowed
(United Kingdom) Davey Boy Smith	(Canada) Diana Hart	1984–2000	Divorced
(United States) Adrian Street	(United States) Miss Linda	2005–2023	Widowed
(United States) Kevin Sullivan	(United States) Nancy Benoit	1985–1997	Divorced
(Japan) Kenzo Suzuki	(Japan) Hiroko Suzuki		
(Japan) Minoru Tanaka	(Japan) Yumi Fukawa	2002–	
(United States) Mike Taylor	(United States) Tracy Castillo	c. 1995–	
(United States) Al Snow	(United States) Bobcat	2009–2016	Divorced
(United States) Dale Torborg	(United States) Christie Wolf	2000–	
(United States) Triple H	(United States) Stephanie McMahon	2003–	
(United States) The Undertaker	(United States) Michelle McCool	2010–	
(United States) Johnny Weaver	(United States) Penny Banner	1959–1994	Divorced
(United States) Billy Wolfe	(United States) Mildred Burke	1936–1952	Divorced
(United States) Billy Wolfe	(United States) Nell Stewart	1953–1954	Divorced
(United States) Buddy Wolfe	(Canada) Vivian Vachon	1978–1979	Divorced
(Canada) Tyson Kidd	(Canada) Nattie Neidhart	2013–	
(United States) Cody Rhodes	(United States) Brandi Rhodes	2013–	
(United States) Matt Hardy	(United States) Reby Sky	2013–	
(United States) Jimmy Uso	(United States) Naomi Knight	2014–	
(United States) The Miz	(Canada) Maryse Ouellet	2014–	
(United States) Daniel Bryan	(United States) Brie Bella	2014–	
(United States) Mike Bennett	(United States) Maria Kanellis	2014–	
(Bulgaria) Miro Barnyashev	(United States) CJ Perry	2016–	
(United States) Jon Moxley	(Canada) Renee Young	2017–	
(United States) Seth Rollins	(Republic of Ireland) Becky Lynch	2021–	
(Australia) Australian Suicide	(Puerto Rico) Vanilla Vargas	2021–2025	Widowed
(United States) Matt Cardona	(Canada) Chelsea Green	2022–	
(Mexico) Andrade El Idolo	(United States) Charlotte Flair	2022–2024	Divorced
(United States) Riddick Moss	(Australia) Emma	2023–	
(Australia) Buddy Matthews	(Australia) Rhea Ripley	2024–	
(United States) William Morrissey	(United States) Lexy Nair	2024–	
(United States) Beth Phoenix	(Canada) Joey Knight	2001–2010	
(United States) Beth Phoenix	(Canada) Edge	2016–	
(Japan) IYO SKY	(Japan) Naraku	2026–	

=== Common-law ===
Husband	Wife	Years	Notes
(United Kingdom) Chris Adams	(United Kingdom) Lady Blossom	1978–1981	Divorced
(Canada) Smith Hart	(Canada) Stacey Angel		Widowed
(United States) Chris Candido	(United States) Tammy Lynn Sytch	c. 1992–2005	Widowed
(United States) Jack Donovan	(United States) Verne Bottoms	c. 1962–1973	Divorced

== Fiances ==
Fiance	Fiancée	Years	Notes
(United States) Bray Wyatt	(United States) JoJo	2022–2023 (Note: The couple had been together since 2017 and had a son and daughter together.)	Bereaved

== Siblings in-law ==
=== Regular ===
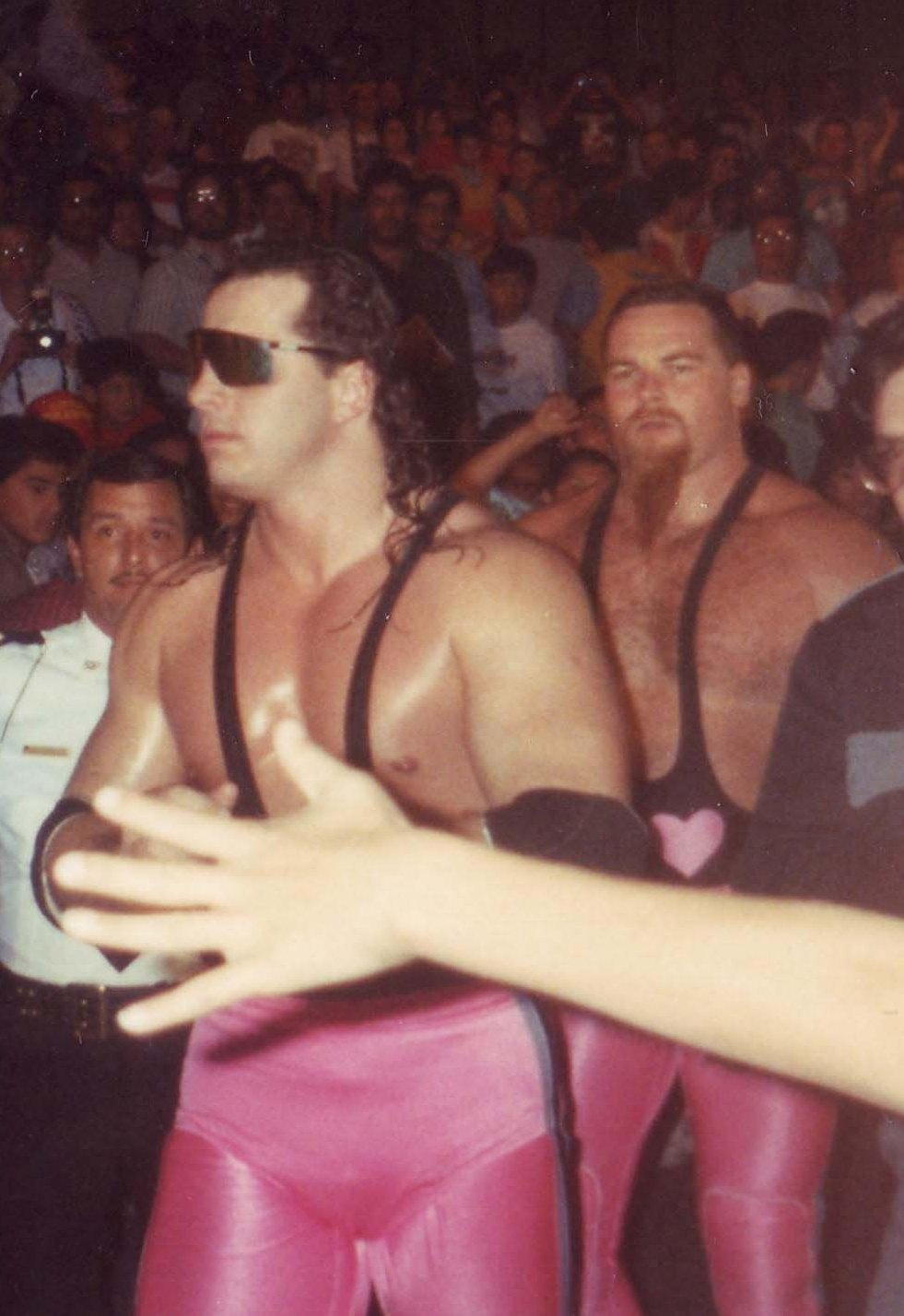
Bret Hart (left) with his brother-in-law Jim Neidhart (right)

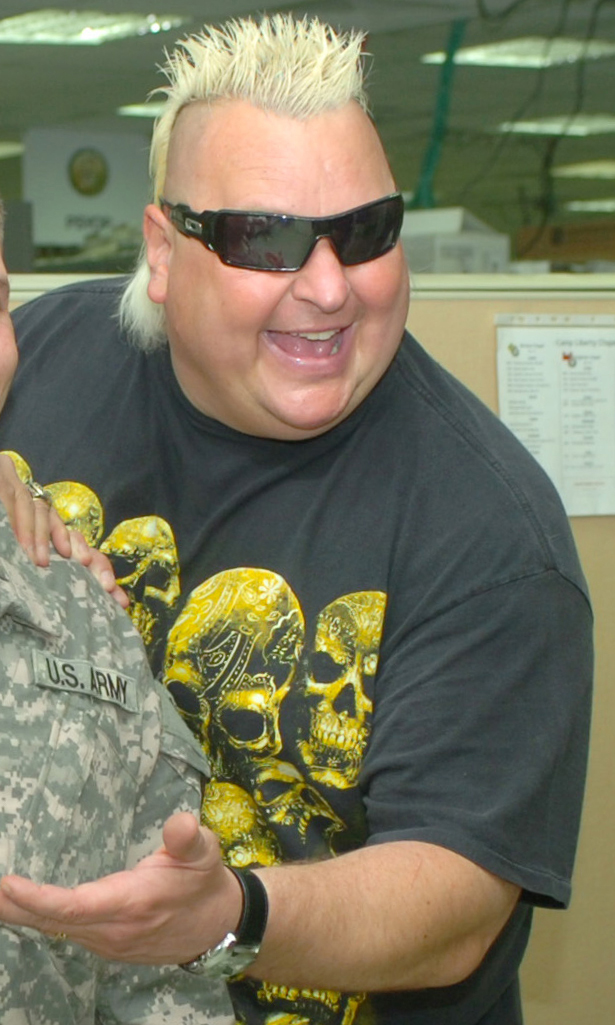
Brian Knobs, pictured here at Camp Liberty in Baghdad, Iraq, is the brother-in-law of Greg "The Hammer" Valentine

In-law	In-law	Country	Notes	Ref(s)
Dick Beyer	Billy Red Lyons	United States		
Bill Dundee	Bobby Eaton	United States		
Bestia Salvaje	Charrito de Oro	Mexico		
Greg Gagne	Larry Zbyszko	United States		
Black Gordman	Sicodelico Sr.	Mexico		
Gory Guerrero	Enrique Llanes	Mexico		
Ben Bassarab	Smith Hart; Bruce Hart; Keith Hart; Wayne Hart; Dean Hart; Ellie Hart; Georgia Hart; Bret Hart; Ross Hart; Diana Hart; Owen Hart	Canada		
Jim Neidhart	Smith Hart; Bruce Hart; Keith Hart; Wayne Hart; Dean Hart; Georgia Hart; Bret Hart; Alison Hart; Ross Hart; Diana Hart; Owen Hart	Canada, United States		
B. J. Annis	Smith Hart; Bruce Hart; Keith Hart; Wayne Hart; Dean Hart; Ellie Hart; Bret Hart; Alison Hart; Ross Hart; Diana Hart; Owen Hart	Canada, United States		
Davey Boy Smith	Smith Hart; Bruce Hart; Keith Hart; Wayne Hart; Dean Hart; Ellie Hart; Georgia Hart; Bret Hart; Alison Hart; Ross Hart; Owen Hart	Canada, Great Britain		
Julie Hart	Smith Hart; Bruce Hart; Keith Hart; Wayne Hart; Dean Hart; Ellie Hart; Georgia Hart; Alison Hart; Ross Hart; Diana Hart; Owen Hart	Canada		
Martha Hart	Smith Hart; Bruce Hart; Keith Hart; Wayne Hart; Dean Hart; Ellie Hart; Georgia Hart; Bret Hart; Alison Hart; Ross Hart; Diana Hart	Canada		
"Dynamite Kid" Thomas Billington	Julie Hart	Great Britain, Canada	Dynamite was the husband of Julie's sister Michelle.	
Bret Hart	Michelle Billington	Canada	Bret was the husband of Michelle's sister Julie.	
Pete Wilson	Lindsay Hart	Canada		
Greg Valentine	Brian Knobs	United States		
Buddy Wolfe	Maurice Vachon; Paul Vachon	Canada, United States		
Edge	Sean Morley	Canada, United States	Copeland was married to Morley's sister Alannah	

== Co-siblings-in-law ==
=== Regular ===
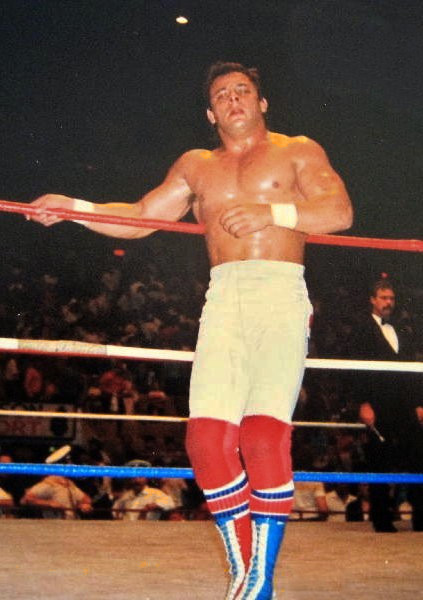
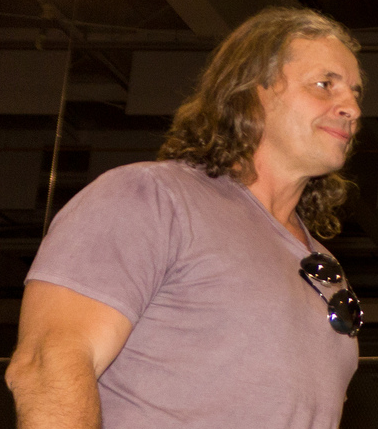
"Dynamite Kid" Thomas Billington (top) and Bret "Hitman" Hart (bottom) were co-brothers-in-law.

In-law	In-law	Country	Note(s)	Ref(s)
Ric Flair	Scott McGhee	United States	Married a pair of sisters.	
Bret Hart	"Dynamite Kid" Thomas Billington	Canada Great Britain	Bret Hart married Julie Smadu, and Tom Billington married Michelle Smadu. Julie and Michelle are sisters.	
Michelle Billington	Smith Hart; Bruce Hart; Keith Hart; Wayne Hart; Dean Hart; Ellie Hart; Georgia Hart; Alison Hart; Ross Hart; Diana Hart; Owen Hart	Canada	Bret Hart married Julie Smadu, Michelle Smadu is Julies' sister, thus Bret's siblings are Michelle's co-siblings-in-law	

== Parents–children in-law ==
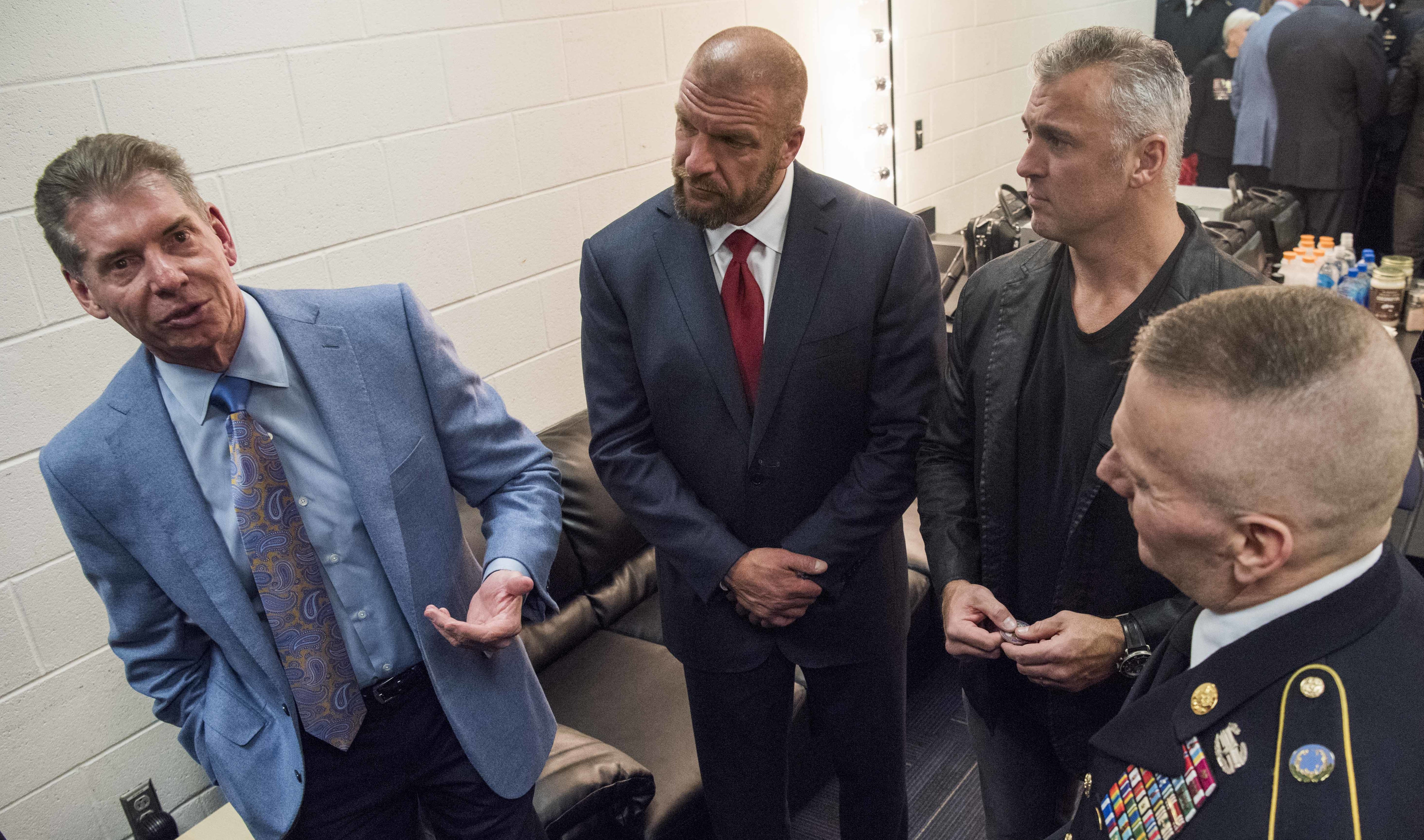
Vince McMahon and his son-in-law Triple H

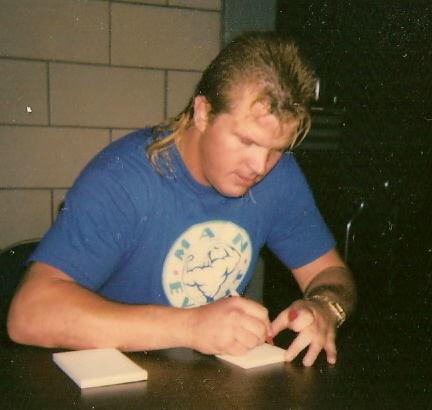
Bobby Eaton's father-in-law is Bill Dundee, who was his booker while he competed in the Memphis Territory

=== Regular ===
Parent-in-law	Child-in-law	Country	Note(s)	Ref(s)
B. J. Annis	Fay	Canada	Fay married Brad's son Edward	
Afa Anoaʻi	Gary Albright	American Samoa, United States	Gary married Afa's daughter Monica.	
Ben Bassarab	Pete Wilson	Canada	Peter married Ben's daughter Brooke	
Ángel Blanco	Ángel Blanco II	Mexico		
Eddie Guerrero and Vickie Guerrero	Aiden English	Mexico, United States	Matthew married Eddie and Vickie's daughter Raquel Diaz	
Stu Hart and Helen Hart	Stacey Angel	Canada	Stacey was Stu and Helen's son Smith's common-law wife	
Stu Hart and Helen Hart	B. J. Annis	Canada, United States	Brad married Stu and Helen's daughter Georgia	
Stu Hart and Helen Hart	Ben Bassarab	Canada	Ben married Stu and Helen's daughter Alison	
Stu Hart and Helen Hart	Julie Hart	Canada	Julie married Stu and Helen's son Bret	
Stu Hart and Helen Hart	Martha Hart	Canada	Martha married Stu and Helen's son Owen	
Stu Hart and Helen Hart	Jim Neidhart	Canada, United States	Jim married Stu and Helen's daughter Ellie	
Stu Hart and Helen Hart	Davey Boy Smith	Canada, Great Britain	David married Stu and Helen's daughter Diana	
Eddie Marlin	Jerry Jarrett	United States		
Vince McMahon and Linda McMahon	Triple H	United States	Triple H married Vince and Linda's daughter Stephanie McMahon	
Blackjack Mulligan	Mike Rotunda	United States		
Jim Neidhart	Tyson Kidd	Canada	Theodore married Jim's daughter Natalie	
Chris Adams and Jeanie Clarke	Adam Bryniarski	United Kingdom	Bryniarski married Adams and Clarke's daughter Jade.	

=== Adopted, step and foster ===
Parent-in-law	Child-in-law	Country	Note(s)	Ref(s)
Peter Maivia	Rocky Johnson	United States, Canada	Johnson married Maivia's adopted daughter Ata Maivia.	
Steve Austin	Adam Bryniarski	United States United Kingdom	Bryniarski married Austin's adopted daughter Jade.	

== See also ==
- List of family relations in American football
- List of second-generation Major League Baseball players
- List of second-generation National Basketball Association players
- List of family relations in the NHL
- List of rugby league families
- List of association football families of note
- List of international rugby union families
- List of chess families
- List of boxing families
- List of professional sports families
