= Blood and Thunder (2023) =

Major League Wrestling event

- Promotional poster of the event
- Promotion: Major League Wrestling
- Date: January 7, 2023
- City: Philadelphia, Pennsylvania
- Venue: 2300 Arena
- Attendance: 1,100-1,300

Event chronology
← Previous; Fightland	Next → SuperFight

Blood and Thunder chronology
← Previous; 2022	Next → 2024

Blood and Thunder (2023) was a professional wrestling supercard event produced by Major League Wrestling (MLW), which took place on January 7, 2023 at the 2300 Arena in Philadelphia, Pennsylvania. It was the third event under the MLW Blood and Thunder chronology, and also featured wrestlers from the Dragon Gate promotion.

Originally a television taping for MLW Fusion, matches and segments from the event would also air on the promotion's new flagship series, MLW Underground Wrestling, which premiered on February 7, 2023.

== Production ==
=== Background ===
On November 2, 2022, MLW announced that Blood and Thunder took place on January 7, 2023 at the 2300 Arena in Philadelphia.

=== Storylines ===
The supercard consists of matches that result from scripted storylines, where wrestlers portrayed villains, heroes, or less distinguishable characters in scripted events that built tension and culminated in a wrestling match or series of matches, with results predetermined by MLW's writers. Storylines are played out on MLW's weekly series, Fusion and Azteca, as well as the league's social media platforms.

Through MLW's "Open Door Policy", several free agents have been signed on for the event. This includes Game Changer Wrestling mainstays Billie Starkz and Rickey Shane Page, as well as the MLW return of Johnny Fusion (formerly known by his real name of John Hennigan). Several names from MLW's partner Dragon Gate will also be featured, including Ben-K, La Estrella, and Yamato.

On the January 13, 2022 episode of MLW Azteca, 2021 Opera Cup winner Davey Richards was found to be attacked, with the Opera Cup Trophy haven been stolen from his possession. For much of the year, speculation rose about who stole the trophy. At Fightland, 2019 Opera Cup winner Davey Boy Smith Jr. - making his return to MLW after nearly two years - teamed with his cousins The Billington Bulldogs (Thomas and Mark Billington) to defeat The Bomaye Fight Club (Alex Kane, Myron Reed, and Mr. Thomas). After the match, Smith cut a promo accusing Kane of having stolen the Opera Cup Trophy, while promising to make Kane submit the next time they wrestle. That was proven true when it was revealed that Kane now possessed the trophy on the December 2 episode of Fusion. The trophy, now with visible damage, had been renamed the "Bomaye Cup of the Gods" by Kane; and stated that even if MLW were to hold the Opera Cup tournament again, he would still keep the trophy. On December 14, MLW announced on their website that Kane and Smith will face each other at Blood and Thunder. Additionally, MLW announced on December 27 that The Billington Bulldogs will face The BFC's Reed and Thomas in a tag team match.

== Results ==
No.	Results	Stipulations	Times
1	Dr. Dax defeated Moses Maddox	Singles match	—
2	Alexander Hammerstone (c) vs. Lance Anoa'i (with The Samoan SWAT Team (Jacob Fatu and Juicy Finau)) ended in a no contest	Singles match for the MLW World Heavyweight Championship	1:49
3	The Billington Bulldogs (Thomas and Mark Billington) defeated The Bomaye Fight Club (Myron Reed and Mr. Thomas)	Tag team match	6:46
4	Sam Adonis (with Cesar Duran and Los Aztecas (Cinco and Uno) defeated Calvin Tankman	Singles match	3:22
5	Microman defeated Real1	Singles match	2:18
6	Alex Kane (with Mr. Thomas) defeated Davey Boy Smith Jr. (with The Billington Bulldogs (Thomas and Mark Billington))	Singles match	10:40
7	Taya Valkyrie (c) (with Cesar Duran and Azteca Uno) defeated Zoey Skye	Singles match for the MLW World Women's Featherweight Championship	3:52
8	Alexander Hammerstone (c) defeated Yamato	Singles match for the MLW World Heavyweight Championship	5:41
9	Akira defeated Mike Law	Singles match	1:23
10	Lince Dorado, La Estrella, and Microman defeated Azteca Underground (Delirious, Mini Abismo Negro, and Azteca Uno) (with Cesar Duran)	Trios match	9:38
11	Rickey Shane Page defeated Mance Warner	Hardcore match	11:05
12	The Samoan SWAT Team (Lance Anoa'i and Juicy Finau) defeated Hustle & Power (E. J. Nduka and Calvin Tankman) (c)	Tag team match for the MLW World Tag Team Championship	5:06
13	Billie Starkz defeated Kayla Kassidy	Singles match	4:41
14	Johnny Fusion (with Cesar Duran) defeated Davey Richards (c)	Singles match for the MLW National Openweight Championship	9:51
15	Lince Dorado (c) defeated La Estrella (with Cesar Duran and Uno)	Singles match for the MLW World Middleweight Championship	8:08
16	The Billington Bulldogs (Thomas and Mark Billington) defeated The Full Blooded Italians (Little Guido and Ray Jaz)	Tag team match	4:15
17	Jacob Fatu defeated Ben-K by pinfall	Singles match	13:41
(c) / – the champion(s) heading into the match
