= Opera Cup (2023) =

2023 Major League Wrestling tournament

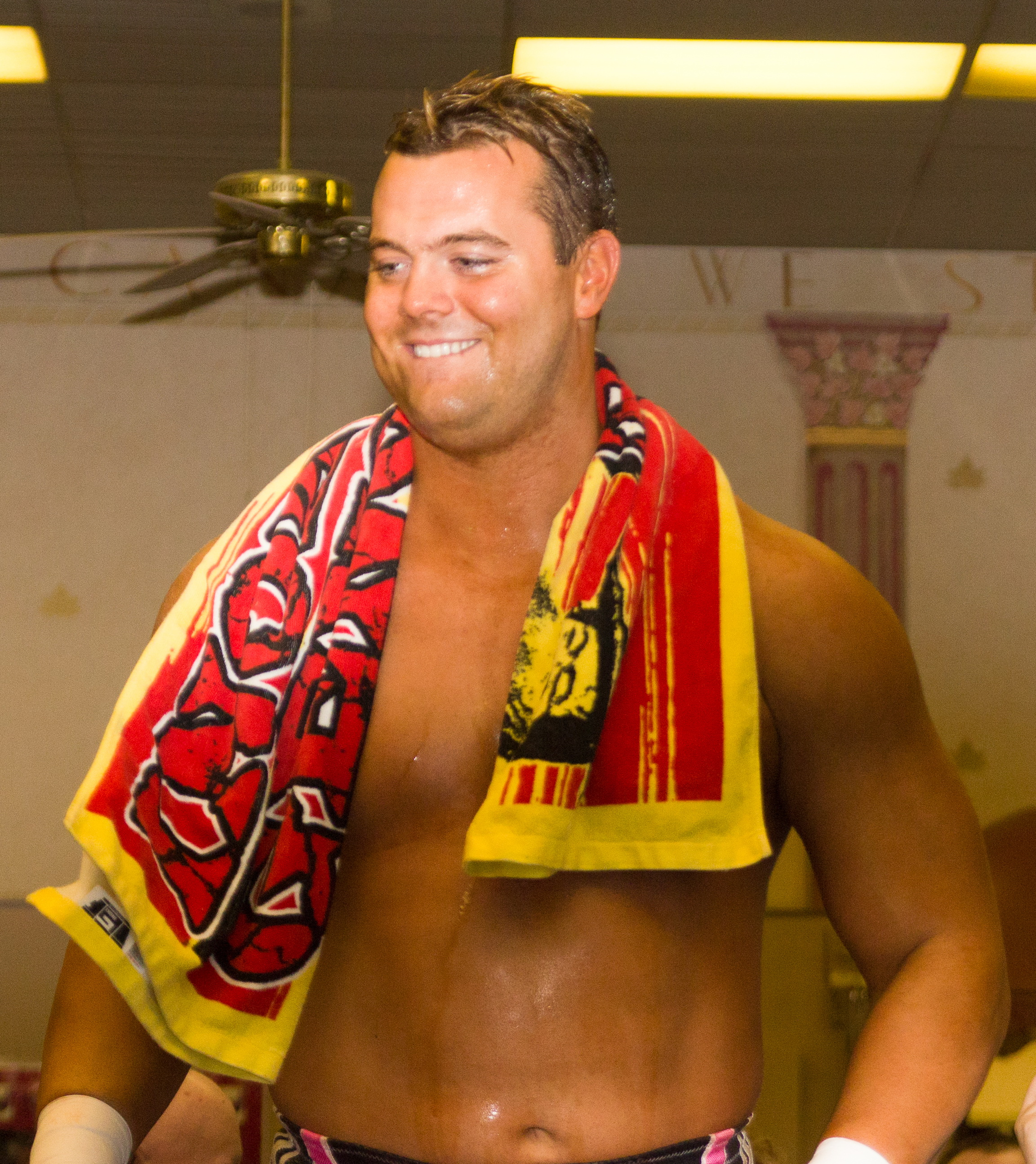
- The 2023 winner Davey Boy Smith Jr.
- Venue: Semifinals: Melrose Ballroom (April 6); Finals: 2300 Arena (April 8)
- Location: Semifinals: Philadelphia, Pennsylvania (April 6); Finals: Queens, New York (April 8)
- Start date: April 6, 2023
- End date: April 8, 2023
- Competitors: Calvin Tankman; Tony Deppen; Tracy Williams

Champion
- Davey Boy Smith Jr.

Opera Cup (2023) was the fourth Opera Cup professional wrestling tournament produced by Major League Wrestling (MLW). The first two rounds were held at War Chamber on April 6, 2023, while the finals took place at Battle Riot V on April 8, 2023. These matches aired on later episodes of Fusion.

Davey Boy Smith Jr. won the tournament for the second time by defeating Tracy Williams in the final, thus becoming the first two-time winner of the Opera Cup tournament, having won the inaugural tournament in 2019.

== Production ==
=== Background ===
The Opera House Cup was annually held as a professional wrestling tournament for nearly fifty years in various cities in the United States until its discontinuation in 1948. Stu Hart won the final tournament and kept the possession of the Opera Cup trophy since then. On July 21, 2019, Major League Wrestling announced that it would be holding an event on December 5 at the Melrose Ballroom in Queens, New York City, New York which would be a set of television tapings of MLW's television program Fusion. On July 24, it was reported that Stu Hart's grandson and MLW wrestler Teddy Hart would be donating an inherited "family heirloom" to MLW. On July 30, MLW.com announced that the family heirloom was Stu Hart's Opera Cup trophy and MLW would be bringing back the Opera Cup tournament on the December 5 supercard, naming it Opera Cup.

On March 22, 2023, it was announced on MLW's official website that the fourth edition of the Opera Cup tournament would occur as a four-man tournament, with the first round matches taking place at War Chamber on April 6.

=== Storylines ===
The tournament consists of matches that result from scripted storylines, where wrestlers portray villains, heroes, or less distinguishable characters in scripted events that build tension and culminated in a wrestling match or series of matches, with results predetermined by MLW's writers. Storylines were played out on MLW's television programs Fusion and Underground Wrestling, social media channels, MLW's social media channel and MLW's YouTube channel.

On March 16, MLW announced that a match would take place between Davey Boy Smith Jr. and Calvin Tankman during the War Chamber television tapings on April 6. Following the announcement of the Opera Cup tournament, it was made a tournament match for the first round of Opera Cup. On March 24, Tony Deppen and Tracy Williams were announced to compete in the other Opera Cup first round match at War Chamber.

== Results ==
Semi-final (April 6)
No.	Results	Stipulations	Times
1	Davey Boy Smith Jr. defeated Calvin Tankman	Singles match (Fusion – July 20)	10:29
2	Tracy Williams defeated Tony Deppen	Singles match (Fusion – July 27)	11:42

Final (April 8)
No.	Results	Stipulations	Times
1	Davey Boy Smith Jr. defeated Tracy Williams	Singles match (Fusion – August 17)	9:45

== Tournament brackets ==
Semifinals; War Chamber (April 6)
Davey Boy Smith Jr.	Pin
Calvin Tankman	10:29
Tony Deppen	11:42
Tracy Williams	Pin

Final; Battle Riot V (April 8)
Davey Boy Smith Jr.	Pin
Tracy Williams	9:45
