= Battle Riot V =

2023 Major League Wrestling event

- Promotional poster for the "Special Edition" broadcast on FITE
- Promotion: Major League Wrestling
- Date: April 8, 2023 (aired April 25, 2023)
- City: Philadelphia, Pennsylvania
- Venue: 2300 Arena
- Attendance: 1,000-1,300

Event chronology
← Previous; War Chamber	Next → Never Say Never

Battle Riot chronology
← Previous; IV	Next → VI

Battle Riot V was a professional wrestling supercard event produced by Major League Wrestling (MLW) that took place on April 8, 2023, at the 2300 Arena in Philadelphia, Pennsylvania. It was the fifth event under the Battle Riot chronology, and featured the finals of the 2023 Opera Cup.

The main event aired as a special episode of MLW Underground Wrestling on Reelz on April 25, 2023, while other matches were taped for future MLW programming. A "Special Edition" of the telecast was streamed on May 18 for FITE+ subscribers as part of MLW's new partnership with the streamer.

== Production ==
=== Background ===
Other on-screen personnel
Role:	Name:
Commentators	Joe Dombrowski
Commentators	Rich Bocchini

Battle Riot is a recurring event that was established by MLW in 2018. The event is named after the Battle Riot match, a multi-competitor match type in which wrestlers are eliminated until one is left and declared winner. The match begins with a number of participants in the ring, who are then eliminated by either pin, submission, or going over the top rope and having both feet touch the venue floor. The declared winner of the Battle Riot match receives a future title shot for the MLW World Heavyweight Championship. On February 8, 2023, it was announced that Battle Riot V would take place on June 23, 2022, at the 2300 Arena in Philadelphia.

On the March 21 episode of MLW Underground Wrestling, it was announced that the event will air on Reelz in the U.S. It was later announced that Battle Riot V will air on April 25 as an episode of Underground Wrestling.

=== Storylines ===
The show will feature several professional wrestling matches that resulted from scripted storylines, where wrestlers portrayed villains, heroes, or less distinguishable characters in the scripted events that built tension and culminated in a wrestling match or series of matches.

The main feature of the event is the titular Battle Riot match, a 40-man rumble rules-based match where the winner will receive a "golden ticket", which they can redeem for an MLW World Heavyweight Championship match anytime and anywhere.

On March 27, via MLW's "Open Door Policy," MLW announced, in collaboration with Westside Xtreme Wrestling (wXw), Shigehiro Irie will defend the wXw Unified World Wrestling Championship against Calvin Tankman at Battle Riot V.

== Results ==
No.	Results	Stipulations	Times
1	1 Called Manders defeated Yoscifer El	Singles match	1:56
2	Alexander Hammerstone defeated Mr. Thomas	Singles match	2:33
3	B3cca defeated Brittany Blake	Singles match	3:33
4	The Samoan SWAT Team (Lance Anoa'i and Juicy Finau) (c) defeated The Second Gear Crew (Mance Warner and 1 Called Manders)	Hardcore tag team match for the MLW World Tag Team Championship	7:33
5	Jacob Fatu (c) vs. Rickey Shane Page (with Raven and Mandy León) ended in a double disqualification	Singles match for the MLW National Openweight Championship	12:08
6	The FBI (Little Guido and Ray Jaz) defeated The Mane Event (Jay Lyon and Midas Black)	Tag team match	—
7	Willie Mack defeated John Hennigan (with Sam Adonis) and Lio Rush	Three-way match	8:45
8	Akira (c) (with Raven) defeated Lince Dorado	Singles match for the MLW World Middleweight Championship	9:01
9	Shigehiro Irie (c) defeated Calvin Tankman	Singles match for the wXw Unified World Wrestling Championship	9:50
10	Mandy León defeated Billie Starkz	Singles match	2:35
11	Sam Adonis defeated Mance Warner	Strap match	9:46
12	Davey Boy Smith Jr. defeated Tracy Williams	2023 Opera Cup Tournament Final	9:45
13	Delmi Exo (c) defeated Taya Valkyrie	Singles match for the MLW World Women's Featherweight Championship	8:59
14	Alex Kane won by last eliminating Davey Boy Smith Jr.	40-man Battle Riot match for a future MLW World Heavyweight Championship match	41:59
(c) / – the champion(s) heading into the match

=== Opera Cup Tournament bracket ===
Semifinals; War Chamber; April 6
Davey Boy Smith Jr.	Pin
Calvin Tankman	10:29
Tony Deppen	11:42
Tracy Williams	Pin

Final; Battle Riot; April 8
Davey Boy Smith Jr.	Pin
Tracy Williams	9:45

=== Battle Riot match entrances and eliminations ===
Draw	Entrant	Order	Eliminated by	Method of elimination	Elimination(s)
1	Alex Kane	–	Winner	–	11
2	Willie Mack	5	Sam Adonis	Over the top rope	0
3	Jesus Rodriguez	4	Mance Warner	Pinfall	0
4	Lince Dorado	14	Akira	Over the top rope	1
5	Calvin Tankman	11	Rickey Shane Page	Over the top rope	1
6	Lance Anoa'i	2	Alex Kane	Over the top rope	0
7	Micro Man	6	Alex Kane	Submission	2
8	Los Azteca 33	1	Microman and Lince Dorado	Pinfall	0
9	Juicy Finau	23	Akira and Rickey Shane Page	Over the top rope	2
10	The Beastman	3	Calvin Tankman, Juicy Finau, and Microman	Over the top rope	0
11	Little Guido	9	Juicy Finau	Over the top rope	0
12	Sam Adonis	8	Mance Warner (Note: Adonis and Warner eliminated each other.)	Over the top rope	2
13	Mance Warner	7	Sam Adonis	Over the top rope	2
14	Jimmy Lloyd	13	Raven	Pinfall	0
15	Mr. Thomas	15	Delirious	Over the top rope	0
16	TJ Crawford	12	Akira	Over the top rope	0
17	Ken Broadway	10	Akira	Over the top rope	0
18	Calling Soldier 1	20	Jacob Fatu	Over the top rope	0
19	Calling Soldier 2	21	Jacob Fatu	Over the top rope	0
20	Dr. Cornwallis	18	Jacob Fatu	Over the top rope	0
21	Akira	22	Himself	Over the top rope	5
22	Rickey Shane Page	25	Jacob Fatu (Note: Page and Fatu eliminated each other.)	Over the top rope	4
23	Delirious	19	Jacob Fatu	Over the top rope	1
24	Raven	17	Himself	Over the top rope	2
25	Los Azteca 9	16	Rickey Shane Page	Over the top rope	0
26	Jacob Fatu	24	Rickey Shane Page	Over the top rope	5
27	Kim Chee	26	Alex Kane	Submission	0
28	Midas Black	27	Alex Kane	Submission	0
29	Taya Valkyrie	28	Alex Kane	Pinfall	0
30	Jay Lyon	29	Alex Kane	Submission	0
31	Ray Jaz	30	Alex Kane	Submission	0
32	Lio Rush	35	Davey Boy Smith Jr.	Over the top rope	1
33	Tracy Williams	33	Davey Boy Smith Jr.	Over the top rope	0
34	O'Shay Edwards	36	Davey Boy Smith Jr.	Over the top rope	1
35	Duke Droese	31	Alex Kane	Submission	0
36	1 Called Manders (Note: Manders replaced fellow Second Gear Crew member Matthew Justice after the latter was attacked by The Calling.)	32	John Hennigan	Over the top rope	0
37	John Morrison	37	Alex Kane	Over the top rope	2
38	Davey Boy Smith Jr.	39	Alex Kane	Submission	4
39	Shigehiro Irie	38	Davey Boy Smith Jr.	Over the top rope	0
40	Gene Snisky	34	Alex Kane, O'Shay Edwards, John Hennigan, and Lio Rush	Over the top rope	0
