= War Chamber (2023) =

Major League Wrestling event

- Promotional poster of the event
- Promotion: Major League Wrestling
- Date: April 6, 2023 (aired April 18, 2023)
- City: Queens, New York
- Venue: Melrose Ballroom
- Attendance: 1,000

Event chronology
← Previous; Super Series	Next → Battle Riot V

War Chamber chronology
← Previous; 2021	Next → 2024

War Chamber (2023) was a professional wrestling supercard event produced by Major League Wrestling (MLW), which took place on April 6, 2023, at the Melrose Ballroom in Queens, New York. It was the third event under the War Chamber chronology, and featured the opening of the 2023 Opera Cup.

The event was a television taping for MLW Underground Wrestling, with the main event airing as a special episode on April 18, 2023.

== Production ==
=== Background ===
War Chamber is a professional wrestling supercard event produced by Major League Wrestling (MLW). The first War Chamber event was held on September 7, 2019, as replacement for MLW WarGames, which was discontinued after WWE acquired the rights to the name of the namesake WarGames match. On December 2, 2022, MLW announced that War Chamber will take place on April 6, 2023, from the Melrose Ballroom in Queens, New York.

=== Storylines ===
The card consisted of matches that result from scripted storylines, where wrestlers portray villains, heroes, or less distinguishable characters in scripted events that built tension and culminated in a wrestling match or series of matches, with results predetermined by MLW's writers. Storylines were played out on MLW's main show, MLW Underground Wrestling, as well as MLW's social media platforms.

Through MLW's "Open Door Policy" several free agents would be signed to compete at the event. Names include former Ring of Honor (ROH) star Mandy León and Japanese wrestler Shigehiro Irie.

==== War Chamber ====
For the past several weeks, various members of the MLW roster would be mysteriously assaulted in the backstage area, with the only sign of the attacker(s) being a calling card with the initials "AO." On the February 28 episode of MLW Underground Wrestling, the mysterious attackers would make their first in-person appearance, attacking Lince Dorado, Microman, and Mister Saint Laurent. The following week, a video package aired revealing the identities of the attackers, who would be dubbed "The Calling:" Raven, Rickey Shane Page and Akira. On the March 21 Underground Wrestling, after MLW World Heavyweight Champion Alexander Hammerstone successfully defended his title against Jacob Fatu, he would be ambushed by The Calling, which featured many more masked henchmen. Later that night, while the Second Gear Crew (Mance Warner, Matthew Justice, and 1 Called Manders) were having an interview on the entrance ramp, the Calling's video feed would briefly interrupt them. The week after that, Hammerstone would meet with the Second Gear Crew in a bar, recruiting them to help him battle the Calling (Raven, Page, Akira, and Dr. Cornwallus) in a War Chamber match.

==== Opera Cup ====
On March 23, MLW announced on their website that the Opera Cup tournament would return, with the first round taking place at War Chamber. On March 24, MLW announced that former ROH World Television Champions Tony Deppen and Tracy Williams would face off in the first round of the tournament. The next day, the previously announced match between Davey Boy Smith Jr. and Calvin Tankman was promoted to an Opera Cup first round match.

== Results ==
No.	Results	Stipulations	Times
1	Akira (with Raven) defeated Lince Dorado (c) and Lio Rush	Three-way match for the MLW World Middleweight Championship	6:11
2	The Samoan SWAT Team (Lance Anoa'i and Juicy Finau) (c) (with Jacob Fatu) defeated The FBI (Little Guido and Ray Jaz) and The Mane Event (Jay Lyons and Midas Black)	Three-way tag team match for the MLW World Tag Team Championship	5:48
3	Ken Broadway defeated TJ Crawford	Singles match	6:00
4	Davey Boy Smith Jr. defeated Calvin Tankman	2023 Opera Cup Tournament First Round match	10:29
5	Delmi Exo defeated Taya Valkyrie (c) (with John Hennigan)	Singles match for the MLW World Women's Featherweight Championship	8:43
6	Sam Adonis (with John Hennigan) defeated Willie Mack	Singles match	5:38
7	Billie Starkz defeated B3cca	Singles match	8:38
8	Jacob Fatu defeated John Hennigan (c) (with Taya Valkyrie)	Singles match for the MLW National Openweight Championship	14:13
9	Mandy León (with Raven) defeated Clara Carreras	Singles match	4:21
10	Alex Kane (with Mr. Thomas) defeated Shigehiro Irie	Singles match	7:16
11	Tracy Williams defeated Tony Deppen	2023 Opera Cup Tournament First Round match	11:42
12	Microman (with Mister Saint Laurent) defeated The Beastman (with Kim Chee)	Singles match	2:23
13	The Calling (Rickey Shane Page, Delirious, Akira, and Dr. Cornwallus) (with Raven) defeated Alexander Hammerstone and The Second Gear Crew (Mance Warner, Matthew Justice, and 1 Called Manders)	War Chamber match	27:30
(c) / – the champion(s) heading into the match
