= Blood and Thunder (2019) =

Major League Wrestling event

- Promotion: Major League Wrestling
- Date: November 9, 2019
- City: Orlando, Florida
- Venue: GILT Nightclub
- Attendance: 300-400

Event chronology
← Previous; Saturday Night SuperFight	Next → Opera Cup

Blood and Thunder chronology
← Previous; First	Next → 2022

Blood and Thunder (2019) was a professional wrestling supercard event produced by the Major League Wrestling (MLW) promotion, which took place at the GILT Nightclub in Orlando, Florida on November 9, 2019. It was the first event under the MLW Blood and Thunder chronology. The event was a television taping for the subsequent episodes of MLW Fusion that followed the Saturday Night SuperFight pay-per-view.

Fifteen matches were taped at the event. The main event was a battle royal won by the debuting Grogan. In other prominent matches on the card, Jacob Fatu retained the MLW World Heavyweight Championship against Ross Von Erich, Alexander Hammerstone successfully defended the MLW National Openweight Championship against Douglas James and Myron Reed defeated Teddy Hart in Hart's final MLW match to win the MLW World Middleweight Championship. Prominent non-title matches including Low Ki versus Timothy Thatcher, Tom Lawlor versus Davey Boy Smith Jr. and a Falls Count Anywhere match between Mance Warner and Jimmy Havoc.

== Event ==
The event kicked off with a non-televised match, in which Dr. Dax defeated Budd Henning in a quick match.

=== Preliminary matches ===
The first match to be taped for Fusion featured Low Ki taking on Timothy Thatcher. Thatcher hoisted Ki on his back and Ki capitalized by applying a rear naked choke on Thatcher making him submit to the hold.

Next, Dominic Garrini and Douglas James took on The Dynasty (Alexander Hammerstone and Richard Holliday) in a tag team match. Garrini avoided a Nightmare Pendulum by Hammerstone and then James hit a meteora to Hammerstone and then delivered a Tornado DDT to Hammerstone from the apron onto the floor to knock him out which led to Hammerstone getting counted out.

Next, Tom Lawlor took on Davey Boy Smith Jr. Near the end of the match, Lawlor poked in Smith's eyes but Smith recovered and attempted to hit a running powerslam but Lawlor moved out of the move and slammed on Smith's knee to pin him for the win.

Next, Teddy Hart defended the World Middleweight Championship against Myron Reed. After avoiding repeated interference by Reed's Injustice teammates Jordan Oliver and Kotto Brazil, Hart executed a Hart Destroyer on Reed and covered him for the pinfall but Brazil pulled out the referee. Oliver distracted Hart, which allowed Josef Samael to throw a fireball into Hart's face and Reed executed a springboard 450° splash on Hart to win the title.

Next, Marshall Von Erich took on Contra Unit member Ikuro Kwon. Kwon's teammate Josef Samael interfered in the match by attacking Von Erich, who had applied an iron claw on Kwon, which resulted in Kwon getting disqualified. However, Ross made the save forcing Samael and Kwon to retreat.

Next, Alexander Hammerstone defended the National Openweight Championship against Douglas James. After a back and forth match, Hammerstone executed a Nightmare Pendulum to James to retain the title.

Next, Zeda Zhang took on The Spider Lady in the first and only women's match on the card. Spider Lady was disqualified by the referee after applying a mandible claw and refused to release the hold. She then removed her mask and revealed herself to be Priscilla Kelly and then applied the hold on Zhang again and kicked the referee in the groin.

Next, Injustice members Jordan Oliver and Kotto Brazil took on Gringo Loco and Zenshi in an elimination tag team match. Brazil eliminated Zenshi by nailing a By Any Means Necessary. Loco then quickly executed a kneeling reverse piledriver to Brazil to eliminate him. Myron Reed then came to ringside to punch the referee to Gringo while Oliver distracted the referee and Oliver executed a diving cutter from the middle rope for the win.

Next, mixed martial artist King Mo made his MLW debut by competing against Ricky Martinez. Mo speared a diving Martinez mid-air and followed with a body splash and a gutwrench powerbomb and then applied a leglock on Martinez forcing him to submit to the hold.

Next, The Hart Foundation (Brian Pillman Jr. and Davey Boy Smith Jr.) took on Contra Unit members Ikuro Kwon and Simon Gotch. Pillman and Smith executed a Hart Attack combination on Gotch for the win.

Later, Jacob Fatu defended the World Heavyweight Championship against Ross Von Erich. Marshall Von Erich was originally scheduled to challenge Fatu for the title but he was mysteriously attacked and injured which led to Ross replacing him. The referee was knocked out during the course of the match when Fatu threw a knee at Von Erich which led to him crashing into the referee. Josef Samael interfered in the match by bringing a chair but Von Erich knocked him out and then Von Erich's cornerman Tom Lawlor grabbed the chair and turned on Von Erich by hitting him with a chair. Fatu then hit a moonsault to Von Erich to retain the title.

It was followed by the penultimate match, a falls count anywhere match between Mance Warner and Jimmy Havoc. The battle spilled to the parking lot where Havoc stole a car and escaped the arena and Warner followed him. They brawled in various places throughout the Orlando city including Havoc's house and then a parking lot before returning to the arena where Havoc stabbed Warner with a fork. Havoc then attempted to hit an Acid Rainmaker but Warner avoided it and pinned him with a roll-up for the win.

=== Main event match ===
The main event was a Mystery Box Battle Royal. Barrington Hughes was the first one to get eliminated after a number of wrestlers teamed up to eliminate him. The eliminations continued throughout the match which led to Grogan and Timothy Thatcher remaining the final two participants. Thatcher landed on the apron where Grogan hit him with a big boot, causing Thatcher to get eliminated and Grogan subsequently won the battle royal.

== Aftermath ==
Blood and Thunder marked Teddy Hart's last appearance in MLW as it was noted by MLW that Hart had been severely injured due to the fireball attack by Josef Samael. On December 6, Hart was released by his MLW contract.

== Results ==
No.	Results	Stipulations	Times
1^{D}	Dr. Dax defeated Budd Henning	Singles match	3:10
2	Low Ki defeated Timothy Thatcher via submission	Singles match	16:35
3	Dominic Garrini and Douglas James defeated The Dynasty (Alexander Hammerstone and Richard Holliday) by countout	Tag team match	7:20
4	Tom Lawlor defeated Davey Boy Smith Jr.	Singles match	14:30
5	Myron Reed (with Jordan Oliver and Kotto Brazil) defeated Teddy Hart (c)	Singles match for the MLW World Middleweight Championship	9:35
6^{D}	Gino Medina (with Salina de la Renta) defeated enhancement talent	Singles match	0:41
7	Marshall Von Erich (with Ross Von Erich) defeated Ikuro Kwon (with Josef Samael) by disqualification	Singles match	4:00
8	Alexander Hammerstone (c) defeated Douglas James	Singles match for the MLW National Openweight Championship	9:30
9	Zeda Zhang defeated The Spider Lady by disqualification	Singles match (First ever MLW Women's Featherweight Division match)	4:33
10	Injustice (Jordan Oliver and Kotto Brazil) (with Myron Reed) defeated Gringo Loco and Zenshi	Elimination tag team match	7:34
11	King Mo defeated Ricky Martinez via submission	Singles match	3:12
12	The Hart Foundation (Brian Pillman Jr. and Davey Boy Smith Jr.) defeated Contra Unit (Ikuro Kwon and Simon Gotch)	Tag team match	9:32
13	Jacob Fatu (c) (with Josef Samael) defeated Ross Von Erich (with Tom Lawlor)	Singles match for the MLW World Heavyweight Championship	14:51
14	Mance Warner defeated Jimmy Havoc	Falls Count Anywhere match	5:57
15	Grogan won by last eliminating Timothy Thatcher	Mystery Box Battle Royal^{1}	10:00
(c) / – the champion(s) heading into the match; D / – this was a dark match

^1Other participants were Barrington Hughes, Dominic Garrini, Douglas James, Dr. Dax, Gringo Loco, Jordan Oliver, Kotto Brazil, Leo Brien, Myron Reed, Richard Holliday, Ricky Martinez, Savio Vega and Zenshi.
