= MLW Blood and Thunder =

Blood and Thunder
- Promotions: Major League Wrestling
- First event: Blood and Thunder (2019)

Blood and Thunder is a professional wrestling supercard event produced by Major League Wrestling (MLW) that was first held in 2019. The first three events served as television tapings for MLW Fusion, while other matches from the third event aired as part of MLW Underground Wrestling.

The event's name was used in 2026 for a special episode of Fusion, but it featured matches taped from the Fantastica Mania USA event.

== Dates and venues ==
Aired Live

#	Event	Date	City	Venue	Main Event	Notes	Ref
1	Blood and Thunder (2019)	November 9, 2019	Orlando, Florida	Gilt Nightclub	15-man Mystery Box Battle Royal		
2	Blood & Thunder (2022)	January 21, 2022	Dallas, Texas	Gilley's Dallas	Jacob Fatu vs. Mads Krügger		
3	Blood and Thunder (2023)	January 7, 2023	Philadelphia, Pennsylvania	2300 Arena	Jacob Fatu vs. Ben-K		
4	Blood & Thunder (2024)	July 12, 2024	St. Petersburg, Florida	The Coliseum	Matt Riddle vs. Sami Callihan in a No Ropes Deathmatch		
5	Blood and Thunder (2025)	June 26, 2025	Queens, New York	Melrose Ballroom	Satoshi Kojima vs. Bobby Fish	Aired August 9, 2025	
6	Blood and Thunder (2026)	April 12, 2026	Charleston, South Carolina	Festival Hall	Killer Kross (c) vs. Satoshi Kojima for the MLW World Heavyweight Championship	Aired August 8, 2026	
