= Billington Bulldogs =

Professional wrestling tag team

Tag team
- Members: Mark Billington; Thomas Billington
- Name(s): Billington Bulldogs; Dynamic Duo; Dynamite Duo
- Billed from: Wigan, Greater Manchester, England
- Debut: August 25, 2018
- Years active: 2018–present
- Trained by: Marty Jones; Davey Boy Smith Jr. Bret Hart

The Billington Bulldogs were a British professional wrestling tag team, consisting of real-life brothers Mark Billington and Thomas Billington, the nephews of Dynamite Kid, one-half of the tag team the British Bulldogs. They are currently the Dungeon Wrestling Tag Team Champions in the first reign, being the inaugural champions for that title.

Since debuting in 2018, the Billington Bulldogs have competed in various wrestling promotions primarily in the British and Canadian independent circuit. They are also known for their tenure in Major League Wrestling (MLW). The team has been successful in the independent circuit, becoming the inaugural Pro2 Wrestling, Wild Rose Sports Association (WRSA) and Dungeon Wrestling Tag Team Champions.

== History ==
=== Independent circuit (2018–2023) ===
After being trained by British wrestling legend Marty Jones, Mark and Thomas Billington made their professional wrestling debut as "The Dynamic Duo" for a Royal Imperial Wrestling event Tequila Sunrise 7: Heat Of The Battle on August 25, 2018. Dynamite Duo competed as participants in a gauntlet match, won by High And Mighty (Mark Daniels and Martyn Grant). They used the Dynamic Duo name during their early years before ceasing to use the name in 2019 and changed the team name to Billington Bulldogs. They once used the Dynamite Duo name at a Fight Forever Wrestling event Dance of the Dragon on March 29, 2019, where they lost to British wrestling veterans Jody Fleisch and Jonny Storm.

==== Defiant Wrestling (2019) ====
On the January 13, 2019 episode of Loaded, Mark Billington and Thomas Billington made their Defiant Wrestling debut as they were introduced by their trainer Marty Jones and competed in an exhibition match against each other. The match ended in a no contest after The South Coast Connection (Ashley Dunn and Kelly Sixx) interfered by attacking both men.

==== Pro2 Wrestling (2021–2022) ====
Billington Bulldogs competed for Pro2 Wrestling at Brawl at the Hall on November 6, 2021, where they defeated Patter N Batter (Ewan O'Raw and Stone Malone) to become the inaugural Pro2 Tag Team Champions. At Joker's Wild, Bulldogs successfully defended the titles against Hammerhead Smith and Rob Valentine. They vacated the titles at Battle Lines on October 23, 2022.

==== Revolution Pro Wrestling (2023) ====
In October 2023, it was announced that Billington Bulldogs would make their debut for Revolution Pro Wrestling as participants in the Block A of the 2023 Great British Tag League at Live in Southampton 26 on October 8. Bulldogs lost their first match in the tournament against Lykos Gym (Kid Lykos and Kid Lykos II). Bulldogs lost their next matches in the tournament against The Knights (Ricky Knight Jr. and Zak Knight), and Keiron Lacey and Mark Trew.

==== Dungeon Wrestling (2022–2023) ====
In October, it was reported by CTV News that Billington Bulldogs would compete against The Bollywood Boyz (Gurv Sihra and Harv Sihra) at Dungeon Wrestling's debut show WrestleWeen on October 29, 2022. The match ended in a time limit draw. At the Unfinished Business pay-per-view, Billington Bulldogs defeated Bollywood Boyz to become the inaugural Dungeon Wrestling Tag Team Champions. They successfully defended the titles against The Dark Sun Brothers (Sol and X-Devil) at Romero Rumble 2.

=== Major League Wrestling (2022–2023) ===
On October 14, 2022, it was reported on Major League Wrestling's official website that Billington Bulldogs would make their MLW debut by teaming with their cousin Davey Boy Smith Jr. (the son of Davey Boy Smith, Dynamite Kid's cousin and tag team partner) against Bomaye Fight Club (Alex Kane, Myron Reed and Mr. Thomas) at Fightland. Prior to their debut, the Billington Bulldogs had furthered their training under the tutelage of Smith and Bret Hart. Smith and the Billington Bulldogs won the match, which aired on the January 12, 2023 episode of Fusion, marking their televised debut in MLW. On November 16, it was reported that Billington Bulldogs had officially signed a multi-year contract with MLW. On the February 21, 2023 episode of Underground Wrestling, Billington Bulldogs defeated The Full Blooded Italians (Little Guido and Ray Jaz). Billington Bulldogs continued their feud with Bomaye Fight Club as they were scheduled to take on Reed and Thomas in a match at Blood and Thunder, which aired on the March 7 episode of Underground Wrestling. This was their last match in MLW and they quietly departed MLW shortly after as their profiles were removed from MLW's roster section by April.

== Championships and accomplishments ==
- Pro2 Wrestling
  - Pro2 Wrestling Tag Team Championship (1 time inaugural)
- Wild Rose Sports Association
  - WRSA Tag Team Championship (1 time, inaugural)
  - WRSA Tag Team Championship Tournament (2022)
- Dungeon Wrestling
  - Dungeon Wrestling Tag Team Championship (1 time, current and inaugural)
