= Tommy Billington =

English professional wrestler

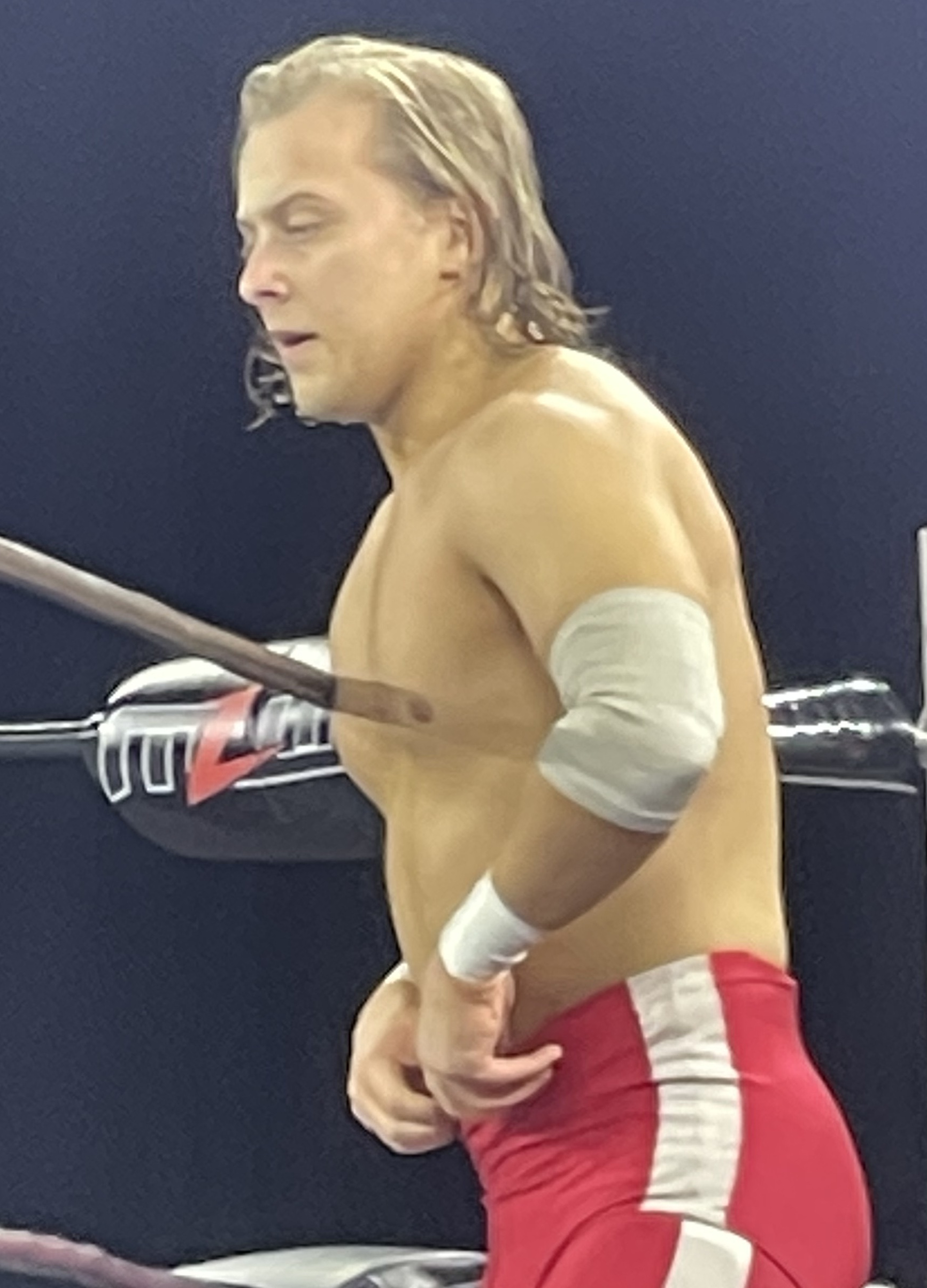
- Billington in 2023

Personal information
- Born: Thomas Billington; 15 December 2001 (age 24) Golborne, Wigan, England
- Family: Dynamite Kid (uncle)

Professional wrestling career
- Ring name(s): Dynamite Kid (II); Thomas Billington; Tommy Billington
- Billed height: 5 ft 8 in (173 cm)
- Billed weight: 180 lb (82 kg)
- Billed from: Wigan, Greater Manchester, England
- Trained by: Marty Jones; Davey Boy Smith Jr. Bret Hart
- Debut: 2018

Thomas Billington (born 15 December 2001) is an English professional wrestler. He is signed to All Elite Wrestling (AEW). He also makes appearances for its sister promotion Ring of Honor (ROH) and on the independent circuit.

He is the nephew of Dynamite Kid and has gained recognition for his high-flying style and technical prowess. In 2018, Billington began his career as one-half of a tag team with his brother Mark Billington, known as the Billington Bulldogs.

== Early life ==
Billington was born in Golborne, Wigan, England on 15 December 2001. Growing up in a wrestling family, he was inspired by his uncle, the Dynamite Kid, and began training at a young age under the guidance of Marty Jones, Davey Boy Smith Jr., and Bret Hart.

== Professional wrestling career ==
=== Early career (2018–2022) ===
Billington made his professional wrestling debut in 2018, teaming with his brother Mark as the Billington Bulldogs. They competed in various independent promotions across the UK and Canada, gaining attention for their dynamic teamwork and homage to their uncle's legacy.

In 2022, the Billington Bulldogs became the inaugural Dungeon Wrestling Tag Team Champions after defeating the Bollywood Boyz at the Unfinished Business pay-per-view.

=== Major League Wrestling (2022–2023) ===
On 14 October 2022, it was reported on Major League Wrestling's official website that Billington Bulldogs would make their MLW debut by teaming with their cousin Davey Boy Smith Jr. (the son of Davey Boy Smith, Dynamite Kid's cousin and tag team partner) against Bomaye Fight Club (Alex Kane, Myron Reed and Mr. Thomas) at Fightland. Prior to their debut, the Billington Bulldogs had furthered their training under the tutelage of Smith and Bret Hart. Smith and the Billington Bulldogs won the match, which aired on the 12 January 2023 episode of Fusion, marking their televised debut in MLW. On 16 November, it was reported that Billington Bulldogs had officially signed a multi-year contract with MLW. On the 21 February 2023 episode of Underground Wrestling, Billington Bulldogs defeated The Full Blooded Italians (Little Guido and Ray Jaz). Billington Bulldogs continued their feud with Bomaye Fight Club as they were scheduled to take on Reed and Thomas in a match at Blood and Thunder, which aired on the 7 March episode of Underground Wrestling. This was their last match in MLW and they quietly departed MLW shortly after as their profiles were removed from MLW's roster section by April.

=== All Elite Wrestling / Ring of Honor (2024–present) ===
Billington made his All Elite Wrestling (AEW) debut on the 11 May 2024 episode of Collision, facing Dax Harwood in a losing effort. His performance was well-received, and in August 2024, it was reported that he had signed a contract with AEW. Billington made his debut for AEW's sister promotion Ring of Honor (ROH) on 20 December at Final Battle, losing to Katsuyori Shibata. In 2025, Billington formed a tag team with Adam Priest.

=== New Japan Pro-Wrestling (2026) ===
On July 7, 2026, Billington made his New Japan Pro-Wrestling (NJPW) debut as one of the two final opponents for Tiger Mask IV, wrestling him to a time-limit draw in the first of Tiger Mask's two retirement matches.

== Personal life ==
Billington continues to honor his family's wrestling heritage, often paying tribute to his uncle through his in-ring style and attire. He remains close with his brother Mark, with whom he has achieved significant success as a tag team.

== Championships and accomplishments ==
- All-Star Wrestling Alliance
  - AWA Tag Team Championship (1 time) – with Mark Billington
- Dungeon Wrestling
  - Dungeon Wrestling Tag Team Championship (1 time, inaugural, current) – with Mark Billington
- Pro2 Wrestling
  - Pro2 Wrestling Tag Team Championship (1 time, inaugural) – with Mark Billington
- Real Canadian Wrestling
  - RCW British Commonwealth Championship (1 time)
- Wild Rose Sports Association
  - WRSA Tag Team Championship (1 time, inaugural) – with Mark Billington
  - WRSA Tag Team Championship Tournament (2022) – with Mark Billington
