= Blood & Thunder (2022) =

Major League Wrestling event

- Promotion: Major League Wrestling
- Date: January 21, 2022
- City: Dallas, Texas
- Venue: Gilley's Dallas
- Attendance: 908

Event chronology
← Previous; MLW Azteca/The Crash show	Next → SuperFight

Blood and Thunder chronology
← Previous; 2019	Next → 2023

Blood & Thunder (2022) was a professional wrestling supercard event produced by Major League Wrestling (MLW), which took place on January 21, 2022, at Gilley's Dallas in Dallas, Texas. The event was a television taping for MLW Fusion, and it was the second event under the MLW Blood and Thunder chronology.

== Production ==
=== Background ===
On November 15, 2021, MLW announced that it would be holding Blood & Thunder at Gilley's Dallas in Dallas, Texas on January 21, 2022.

=== Storylines ===
The supercard consisted of several matches that result from scripted storylines, where wrestlers portrayed villains, heroes, or less distinguishable characters in scripted events that built tension and culminated in a wrestling match or series of matches, with results predetermined by MLW's writers. Storylines were played out on MLW's mini-series, Fusion: Alpha and Azteca, as well as the league's social media platforms.

On November 11, 2021, MLW announced on their website an "open door" policy, allowing free agents from outside the league to compete on MLW shows. Various wrestlers have since been announced for the card, including: Dragon Gate's Ho Ho Lun, All Japan Pro Wrestling upstart tag team Jun and Rei Saito, former ROH Women's World Champion Rok-C, second generation wrestler Miranda Gordy, Mexican mini-estrella Mini Abismo Negro, and former WWE wrestler Buddy Matthews.

On December 10, 2021, it was announced that The Von Erichs (Marshall and Ross Von Erich) would challenge for the MLW World Tag Team Championship, currently held by 5150 (Danny Rivera and Slice Boogie), in a Texas Tornado match at Blood & Thunder. However, on January 20, the Von Erichs announced on Twitter that they've tested positive for COVID-19, leaving them off the show. A replacement team will be announced at the event.

At War Chamber, The Hammerheads (Alexander Hammerstone, EJ Nduka, Richard Holliday, Savio Vega, and Matanza Duran) defeated Contra Unit (Jacob Fatu, Mads Krügger, Ikuro Kwon, and Two Sentai Death Squad soldiers) in the titular match. After the match, a frustrated Krügger blamed Fatu for the loss, with Kwon attempting to play peacemaker. Fatu, in turn, fought back against Krügger, turning face. Contra Unit would disband in the aftermath, with most of its members going AWOL. On January 4, 2022, it was announced on MLW.com that matchmaker Cesar Duran had booked a grudge match between Fatu and Krügger for Blood & Thunder.

On the September 29, 2021 episode of Fusion: Alpha, Alex Kane made his singles debut. Over the next few weeks, Kane and American Top Team teammate King Mo Lawal attempted to recruit Calvin Tankman into their fight camp, but Tankman ultimately turned them down. In retaliation, Kane and Lawal attacked Tankman on the October 27 episode; jamming a power cord into his eye and leaving his face bloody in an attempt to take him out of the Opera Cup tournament so Kane would take his place. On the special November 25 "Fusion on Thanksgiving" episode, Kane cost a medically cleared Tankman his semi final match against TJP. Later that night, Kane bested Zenshi, Myron Reed, Alex Shelley, and surprise entrant A. C. H. in a ladder match to win the vacant MLW National Openweight Championship. Tankman tried to attack Kane after the match, but was stopped by security. On the December 1 episode, Kane introduced a new associate, Mr. Thomas, and announced that he had left American Top Team to create his own fight camp: the Bomaye Fight Club. At the end of the penultimate episode of Fusion: Alpha the following week, Tankman attacked Kane and Thomas in the parking lot. On the Fusion: Alpha series finale, the pair announced that they had pressed charges on Tankman and had him arrested. On January 6, 2022, it was announced that Kane would defend the National Openweight title against Tankman at Blood & Thunder.

On the premiere episode of MLW Azteca, MLW World Heavyweight Champion Alexander Hammerstone and Pagano defeated Black Taurus and King Muertes in an Apocalypto tag team match. After the match, however, Pagano turned on Hammerstone, as he, Muertes, and Taurus beat down Hammerstone before men in Azteca Underground masks carried the champion away. While attempts to contact Cesar Duran were supposedly futile, it was announced on MLW.com that Hammerstone will defend his World Heavyweight title at Blood & Thunder against Pagano in a falls count anywhere match.

At Fightland, Yoshihiro Tajiri won the MLW World Middleweight Championship in his debut, defeating champion Myron Reed, Aramis, and Arez in a four-way match. On January 12, 2022, it was announced that Tajiri will defend the title in an MLW ring for the first time, facing Reed and a mystery participant in a three-way match.

== Results ==
No.	Results	Stipulations	Times
1	King Muertes (c) defeated Richard Holliday	Singles match for the MLW Caribbean Heavyweight Championship	7:34
2	Alex Kane (c) (with Mr. Thomas) defeated Calvin Tankman	Singles match for the MLW National Openweight Championship	8:08
3	EJ Nduka defeated Ikuro Kwon	Singles match	2:23
4	Davey Richards defeated A. C. H.	Singles match	8:58
5	Aramis, El Dragon and Microman defeated Arez, Gino Medina and Mini Abismo Negro (with Dr. Dax)	Trios match	15:46
6	Alexander Hammerstone (c) defeated Pagano	Falls Count Anywhere match for the MLW World Heavyweight Championship	17:15
7	Saito Brothers (Jun Saito and Rei Saito) defeated Budd Heavy and Gnarls Garvin	Tag team match	5:10
8	TJP defeated Buddy Matthews	Singles match	20:21
9	KC Navarro defeated Ho Ho Lun	Singles match	3:29
10	Myron Reed defeated Tajiri (c), Matt Cross, and Bandido	Four-way match for the MLW World Middleweight Championship	8:48
11	5150 (Danny Rivera and Slice Boogie) (c) (with Dr. Julius Smokes) defeated Los Parks (El Hijo de L.A. Park and L.A. Park Jr.)	Ladder match for the MLW World Tag Team Championship	10:18
12	Miranda Gordy defeated Rok-C	Singles match	7:38
13	Jacob Fatu defeated Mads Krügger	Singles match	4:54
(c) / – the champion(s) heading into the match
