= Fightland (2022) =

2022 Major League Wrestling event

- Promotional poster featuring various wrestlers
- Promotion: Major League Wrestling
- Date: October 30, 2022
- City: Philadelphia, Pennsylvania
- Venue: 2300 Arena
- Attendance: 1,000-1,200

Event chronology
← Previous; Super Series	Next → Blood and Thunder

Fightland chronology
← Previous; 2021	Next → 2023

Fightland (2022) was a professional wrestling supercard event produced by Major League Wrestling (MLW). It took place on October 30, 2022, at the 2300 Arena in Philadelphia, Pennsylvania. It was the fourth event in the Fightland chronology, and served as a television taping for MLW Fusion. Other matches from the event aired as part of MLW's new flagship series, Underground Wrestling, which premiered on February 7, 2023.

== Production ==
=== Background ===
On August 15, 2022, MLW announced that Fightland will take place on October 30 at the 2300 Arena in Philadelphia.

=== Storylines ===
The show features several professional wrestling matches that result from scripted storylines, where wrestlers portray villains, heroes, or less distinguishable characters in the scripted events that build tension and culminate in a wrestling match or series of matches.

Through MLW's "Open Door Policy", several free agents would appear at the event. This includes Willie Mack and former MLW World Middleweight Champion Lio Rush. On October 7, MLW announced the signing of Sam Adonis, who will make his MLW debut at Fightland. On October 11, it was announced that Davey Boy Smith Jr. would return to the company at the event. On October 18, Ring of Honor (ROH) veteran Delirious was announced for Fightland. On October 25, independent middleweight wrestler Alec Price was announced for Fightland.

At Battle Riot IV, Alexander Hammerstone retained the MLW World Heavyweight Championship against Richard Holliday in a falls count anywhere match. After the match, Hammerstone would be confronted by MLW World Tag Team Champion EJ Nduka, who was looking to get the next shot at the title. Hammerstone would accept, but would later be attacked by Nduka, who had turned heel for the first time since arriving in MLW. The attack ended when Nduka put Hammerstone through a table. Their rivalry continued at Super Series, where Nduka jumped Hammerstone after the latter's match against Bandido, and then Hammerstone returned that favor after Nduka's match. On October 6, MLW announced on their website that Hammerstone and Nduka will face off for the title in a last man standing match.

== Results ==
No.	Results	Stipulations	Times
1	Dr. Dax defeated Vinny Pacifico by pinfall	Singles match	1:57
2	Alex Kane (with Eel O'Neal and O'Shay Edwards) defeated The Marvelous Jafar by referee stoppage	Prize Fight Challenge	1:26
3	Mance Warner defeated nZo by pinfall	Singles match	0:31
4	Lince Dorado defeated Shun Skywalker (c) by pinfall	Singles match for the MLW World Middleweight Championship	13:01
5	The Samoan SWAT Team (Lance Anoa'i and Juicy Finau) (with Jacob Fatu) defeated The Full Blooded Italians (Little Guido and Ray Jaz) by pinfall	Tag team match	2:41
6	Taya Valkyrie (c) (with Cesar Duran) defeated Trish Adora by pinfall	Singles match for the MLW World Women's Featherweight Championship	5:26
7	Calvin Tankman defeated Willie Mack by pinfall	Singles match	9:40
8	Alexander Hammerstone (c) defeated EJ Nduka by pinfall	Last Man Standing match for the MLW World Heavyweight Championship	11:26
9	Sam Adonis (with Cesar Duran) defeated Johnny Patch by pinfall	Singles match	2:16
10	Davey Boy Smith Jr. and The Billington Bulldogs (Thomas and Mark Billington) defeated The Bomaye Fight Club (Alex Kane, Myron Reed, and Mr. Thomas) by pinfall	Six-man tag team match	8:55
11	nZo defeated Mance Warner by pinfall	Street Fight	5:20
12	Microman and Lince Dorado defeated Azteca Underground (Delirious and Mini Abismo Negro) (with Cesar Duran) by pinfall	Tag team match	8:31
13	Alec Price defeated TJ Crawford by pinfall	Singles match	5:50
14	Trish Adora defeated Gia Scott by pinfall	Singles match	4:00
15	Jacob Fatu defeated Lio Rush by pinfall	Singles match	9:32
(c) / – the champion(s) heading into the match
