= Tiger Mask IV =

Japanese professional wrestler

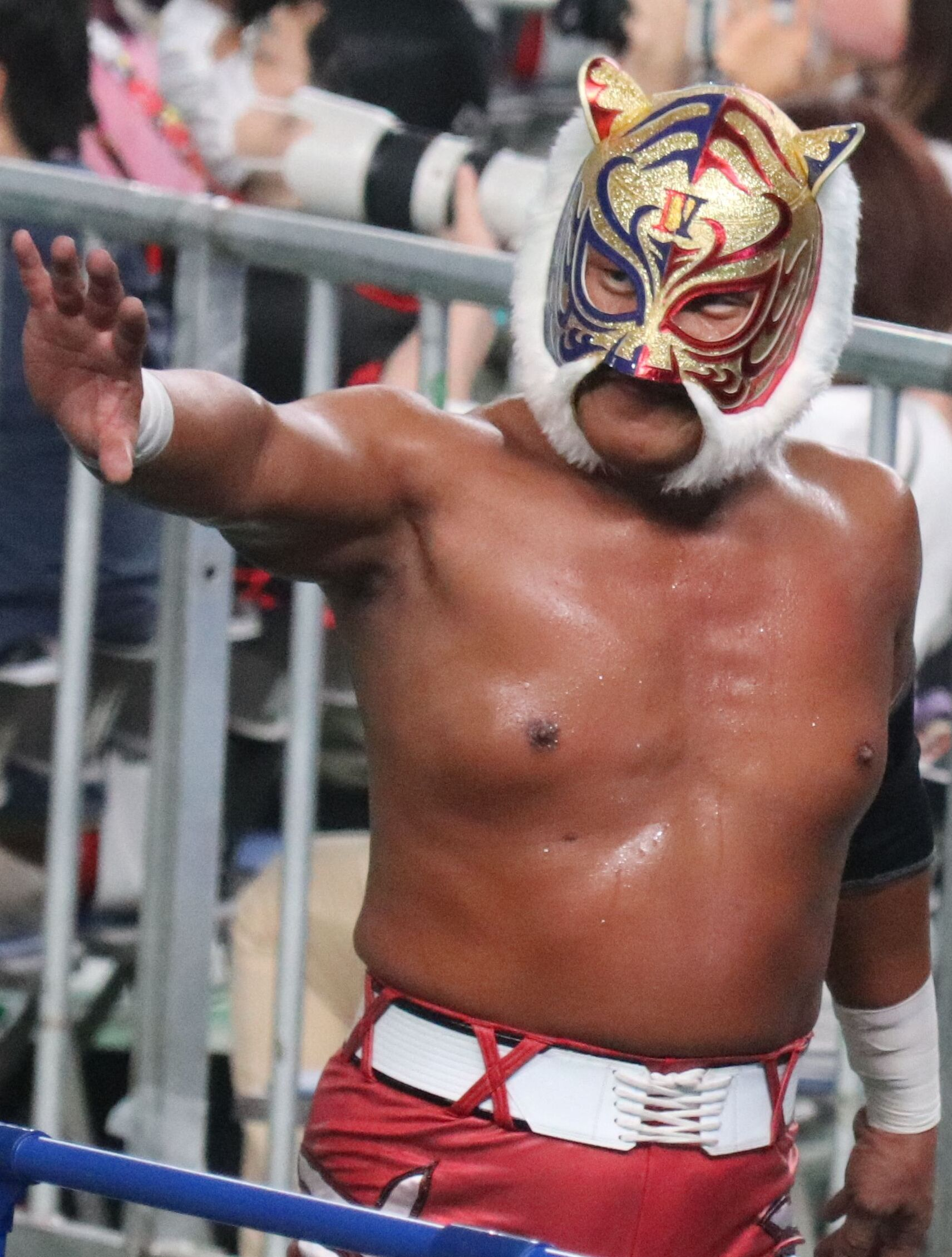
- Tiger Mask in August 2021

Personal information
- Born: Yoshihiro Yamazaki; October 20, 1970 (age 56) Urayasu, Chiba, Japan

Professional wrestling career
- Ring name: Tiger Mask (IV)
- Billed height: 1.73 m (5 ft 8 in)
- Billed weight: 83 kg (183 lb)
- Trained by: Satoru Sayama; The Great Sasuke
- Debut: July 15, 1995
- Retired: August 3, 2026

Yoshihiro Yamazaki (山崎 佳宏, Yamazaki Yoshihiro; born October 20, 1970) is a Japanese professional wrestling trainer and retired luchador enmascarado (or masked professional wrestler). He is signed to New Japan Pro-Wrestling (NJPW) as a trainer. He is best known for being the fourth man to portray Tiger Mask (タイガーマスク, Taigā Masuku). He is a former six-time IWGP Junior Heavyweight Champion and two-time IWGP Junior Heavyweight Tag Team Champion. Having competed as Tiger Mask from 1995 to 2026, he is the longest tenured incarnation of the character.

== Career ==
The young Yamazaki was originally trained by the original Tiger Mask (Satoru Sayama) and The Great Sasuke and unlike the second and third Tiger Masks, Yamazaki has been endorsed by Sayama himself. He also traveled to Mexico where he trained in lucha libre.

=== Michinoku Pro Wrestling (1995–2001) ===
He made his professional wrestling debut in 1995 for Michinoku Pro Wrestling (Michinoku Pro/MPW) and became the fourth Tiger Mask, succeeding Koji Kanemoto. While working for Michinoku Pro Tiger Mask won the "APEX OF TRIANGLE" Six Man Tag Team Championship with his trainer the Great Sasuke and Gran Hamada. Just over a year into his wrestling career Tiger Mask won the UWA World Middleweight Championship and held it for 3 months before being forced to vacate the title due to an injury. After returning from his injury Tiger Mask spent a couple of years working mid card and lower main event matches until he was finally given another run with a singles title when he won a tournament to crown a new British Commonwealth Jr. Heavyweight Champion in London, England. Despite it being called "British Commonwealth", the title was mainly promoted in Japan. Tiger Mask would later vacate the title due to an injury but was given a second reign with the title in 2000 that would last exactly one year shortly before Tiger Mask left Michinoku Pro.

After leaving M-Pro, Yamazaki trained with mixed martial artist and fellow Sayama trainee Enson Inoue. Management of Pride Fighting Championships proposed him to compete in mixed martial arts with his mask on, but he declined after receiving a better offer to wrestle for New Japan Pro-Wrestling. The same year, there was a suggestion of making Guy Mezger fight at Inoki Bom-Ba-Ye replacing Yamazaki under the Mask, but he similarly refused.

=== New Japan Pro-Wrestling (2002–present) ===
Tiger Mask made his NJPW debut on January 4, 2002 at Wrestling World, and at first wrestled as a Michinoku Pro star and not a full-time worker. In December 2002, he officially joined NJPW, and quickly rose in the contenders ranks in the Junior Heavyweight division. On April 23, 2003, Tiger Mask was booked to win the IWGP Junior Heavyweight Championship from then champion Koji Kanemoto. Tiger Mask's first IWGP reign came to an end in December 2003, when he had to vacate the title due to an injury. Tiger Mask returned with renewed strength and won the 2004 Best of the Super Juniors tournament where he beat the then IWGP Junior Heavyweight Champion Heat in the semi-finals and Koji Kanemoto in the finals to win the annual tournament. It wouldn't be until 2005 that Tiger Mask was able to recreate his semi final victory to defeat Heat for the IWGP Jr. Heavyweight Title. Tiger Mask also won the 2005 Best of the Super Juniors making him the first and only wrestler to win the tournament two years in a row until the record would be shared by Hiromu Takahashi in 2021. In October 2005 Tiger Mask lost the title to the fourth incarnation of the Black Tiger gimmick (Rocky Romero). Tiger Mask defeated Black Tiger in a rematch on February 19, 2006, in a match where Black Tiger put both the IWGP Junior Heavyweight Championship and the NWA World Junior Heavyweight Championship on the line, making Tiger Mask a double champion. Tiger Mask's reign as IWGP Junior Heavyweight Champion ended on May 3, 2006, by the man he won the title from the first time, Koji Kanemoto. the NWA World Junior Heavyweight title would reside around Tiger Mask's waist for over a year until he lost it to Mike Quackenbush on a National Wrestling Alliance (NWA) sanctioned show in Portage, Indiana.

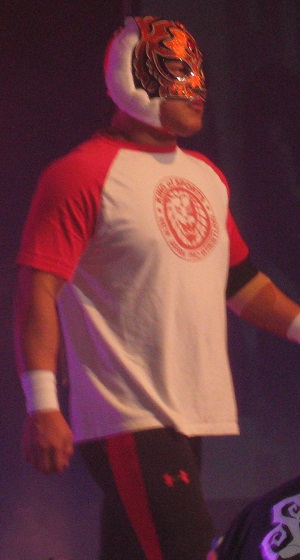
Tiger Mask in September 2013.

When New Japan decided to create several "Brands", Tiger Mask was appointed as an 'ace' of Wrestle Land alongside Hiroshi Tanahashi but ended up wrestling 2 matches under the WRESTLE LAND Brand. In July 2008, Tiger Mask defeated Prince Devitt in a tournament final to become a four-time IWGP World Jr. Heavyweight champion. On the "Circuit 2008 New Japan Generation" tour Low Ki ended Tiger Mask's reign. On January 4, 2009, during NJPW's annual Tokyo Dome show Wrestle Kingdom III, he regained the title and became only the third five-time IWGP World Junior Heavyweight champion in the title's history. Tiger Mask made his first successful title defense Jushin Thunder Liger after which he was presented with a third-generation IWGP Junior Heavyweight championship belt. While being presented with the belt he was attacked by new version of Black Tiger, the fifth version of his storyline arch enemy. After defeating and unmasking the fourth Black Tiger (Rocky Romero) at Resolution '09 in a title vs. mask match, the fifth Black Tiger once again attacked Tiger Mask, gave him a Death Valley driver and then unmasked him. On June 20, 2009, at Dominion 6.20, Tiger Mask defeated Black Tiger V in a mask vs. mask match. Afterwards Black Tiger removed his mask to reveal Tatsuhito Takaiwa, the first native under the Black Tiger mask. On August 15, 2009, at G1 Climax 2009 Tour Tiger Mask lost the IWGP Junior Heavyweight title to Místico. He regained the title on November 8, 2009, at NJPW's Destruction '09 show when he defeated Místico. On January 4, 2010, at Wrestle Kingdom IV in Tokyo Dome Tiger Mask lost the IWGP Junior Heavyweight Championship to Naomichi Marufuji. After losing a rematch to Marufuji on May 8, 2010, Tiger Mask began showing signs of a heel turn as he attacked the champion after the match. Tiger then entered the 2010 Best of the Super Juniors tournament in an attempt to win his third BOSJ and on May 30 continued his heelish behaviour by refusing to shake hands with La Sombra after losing his opening match to him. The following day it was announced that Tiger had suffered a neck injury and would be sidelined for two months, forcing him to forfeit the rest of his matches in the Best of the Super Juniors tournament.

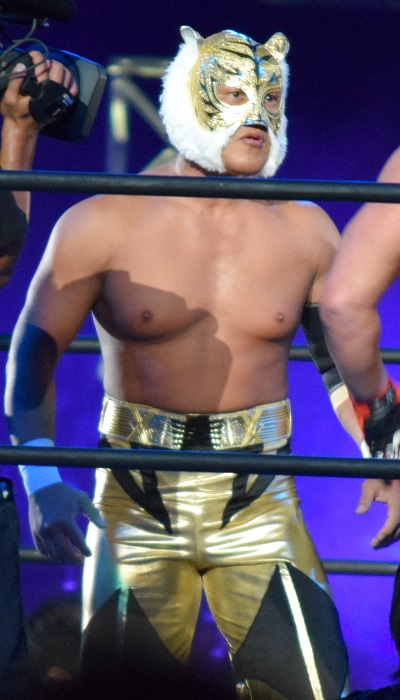
Tiger Mask in August 2015

He made his return on August 14, 2010, in a six-man tag team match, where he, Koji Kanemoto and Ryusuke Taguchi wrestled Pro Wrestling Noah representatives Atsushi Aoki, Ricky Marvin and Taiji Ishimori to a fifteen-minute time limit draw. On August 22 Tiger and Kanemoto defeated Marvin and Ishimori at a Pro Wrestling Noah event to win the promotion's GHC Junior Heavyweight Tag Team Championship. They would lose the title to Atsushi Aoki and Naomichi Marufuji on December 24, 2010. On January 23, 2011, Tiger Mask put his mask on the line in a Mask vs. Hair match at Fantastica Mania 2011, a New Japan and Consejo Mundial de Lucha Libre co–promoted event in Tokyo, and defeated Tomohiro Ishii to win his third Lucha de Apuesta. After the match Ishii attacked and unmasked Tiger Mask. On February 20 at The New Beginning, Tiger Mask defeated Ishii, who had begun wearing a Black Tiger mask, in a Mask vs. Mask match. On June 16, 2012, at Dominion 6.16, Tiger Mask won his first IWGP Junior Heavyweight Tag Team Championship, when he and Jushin Thunder Liger defeated Taichi and Taka Michinoku for the vacant title. On July 22, the team lost the title to Forever Hooligans (Alex Koslov and Rocky Romero). On September 23, 2015, at Destruction in Okayama, Tiger Mask defeated Steve Anthony to win the NWA World Junior Heavyweight Championship for the second time. He lost the title back to Anthony on March 19, 2016. On October 25, 2021, Tiger Mask became IWGP Junior Tag Team Champion with his Flying Tigers teammate Robbie Eagles. The pair later lost the championships to Six or Nine (Ryusuke Taguchi and Master Wato) on February 19, 2022.

On July 6, 2025, Tiger Mask officially announced that he will retire from in-ring competition in July 2026. It was later confirmed that his retirement match will take place on July 7 at Korakuen Hall, the same month and venue where he first made his professional wrestling debut. On July 7, Tiger Mask wrestled the final two matches in Japan, first wrestling Tommy Billington to a time-limit draw before immediately defeating Black Tiger IV. Following the matches, a retirement ceremony featuring appearances from the NJPW roster, Jushin Thunder Liger, Tatsumi Fujinami, Satoru Sayama (the first Tiger Mask), Great Sasuke, and Jinsei Shinzaki, among other figures from notable points in his career. Among other attendees included Japanese baseball legends Tatsunori Hara and Daisuke Miura. Tiger Mask would remain a part of NJPW as a trainer in the NJPW Dojo.

=== Total Nonstop Action Wrestling (2007–2008) ===
Tiger Mask made several appearances for the American-based wrestling company Total Nonstop Action Wrestling (TNA) through the working relationship between NJPW and TNA. He appeared on TNA Sacrifice 2007 in a four-way bout featuring Alex Shelley, Jerry Lynn, and Senshi. He also made a couple of appearances on TNA Impact!, TNA's weekly show in early 2008.

=== Final international matches (2026) ===
Despite his retirement in Japan, Tiger Mask committed to honoring international bookings in France and the United States. Ten days after his retirement, he teamed with Ultimo Dragon to win the ABC Tag Team Championships by defeating champions Jonny Storm and Matthew Ford for the French promotion Association Biterroise de Catch. Tiger Mask officially wrestled his final match on August 3, 2026 for the American promotion PRODUCE Wrestling at their event Volume 3: Azúcar, where he teamed with Tommy Billington to defeat Black Tiger IV and Black Tiger IX. After the match, another retirement ceremony took place which featured an appearance from Kazuchika Okada.

== Other media ==
Outside of wrestling, Yamazaki appeared on the second SASUKE competition in 1998 although he failed to make it past the first obstacle of the First Stage.

== Personal life ==
On July 22, 2006, Yamazaki married a then 32-year-old woman whose given name is unknown, though her former surname was Nishimura. He was previously married to a daughter of wrestler Gran Hamada.

== Championships and accomplishments ==
- All Japan Pro-Wrestling
  - World Junior Heavyweight Championship (1 time)
- Association Biterroise de Catch
  - ABC Tag Team Championship - with Ultimo Dragon (1 time)
- Consejo Mundial de Lucha Libre
  - Ultima Lucha de Tiger Mask en La Arena Mexico belt
- Michinoku Pro Wrestling
  - Apex of Triangle Six–Man Tag Team Championship (1 time) – with The Great Sasuke and Gran Hamada
  - British Commonwealth Jr. Heavyweight Championship (2 times)
  - Fukumen World League (2000, 2007)
  - Fukumen World Tag League (2000) – with Gran Hamada
- National Wrestling Alliance
  - NWA World Junior Heavyweight Championship (2 times)
- New Japan Pro-Wrestling
  - IWGP Junior Heavyweight Championship (6 times)
  - IWGP Junior Heavyweight Tag Team Championship (2 times) – with Jushin Thunder Liger (1) and Robbie Eagles (1)
  - Best of the Super Juniors (2004, 2005)
  - Jr. Heavyweight MVP Award (2005)
- Pro Wrestling Illustrated
  - PWI ranked him No. 21 of the top 500 singles wrestlers in the PWI 500 in 2005
  - PWI ranked him No. 431 of the top 500 singles wrestlers in the PWI Years in 2003
- Pro Wrestling Noah
  - GHC Junior Heavyweight Tag Team Championship (2 times) – with Tiger Mask III (1) and Jushin Thunder Liger (1)
  - NTV G+ Cup Junior Heavyweight Tag League (2013) – Jushin Thunder Liger
- Universal Wrestling Association
  - UWA World Middleweight Championship (1 time)

=== Luchas de Apuestas record ===
Winner (wager)	Loser (wager)	Location	Event	Date	Notes
Tiger Mask IV (IWGP Junior Heavyweight Championship)	Black Tiger (IV) (mask)	Tokyo, Japan	Resolution '09	April 5, 2009	
Tiger Mask (mask)	Black Tiger (V) (mask)	Osaka, Japan	Dominion 6.20	June 20, 2009	
Tiger Mask (mask)	Tomohiro Ishii (hair)	Tokyo, Japan	Fantastica Mania	January 23, 2011	
Tiger Mask (mask)	Black Tiger (VI) (mask)	Sendai, Japan	The New Beginning	February 20, 2011	
