= Opera Cup (2019) =

Professional wrestling event

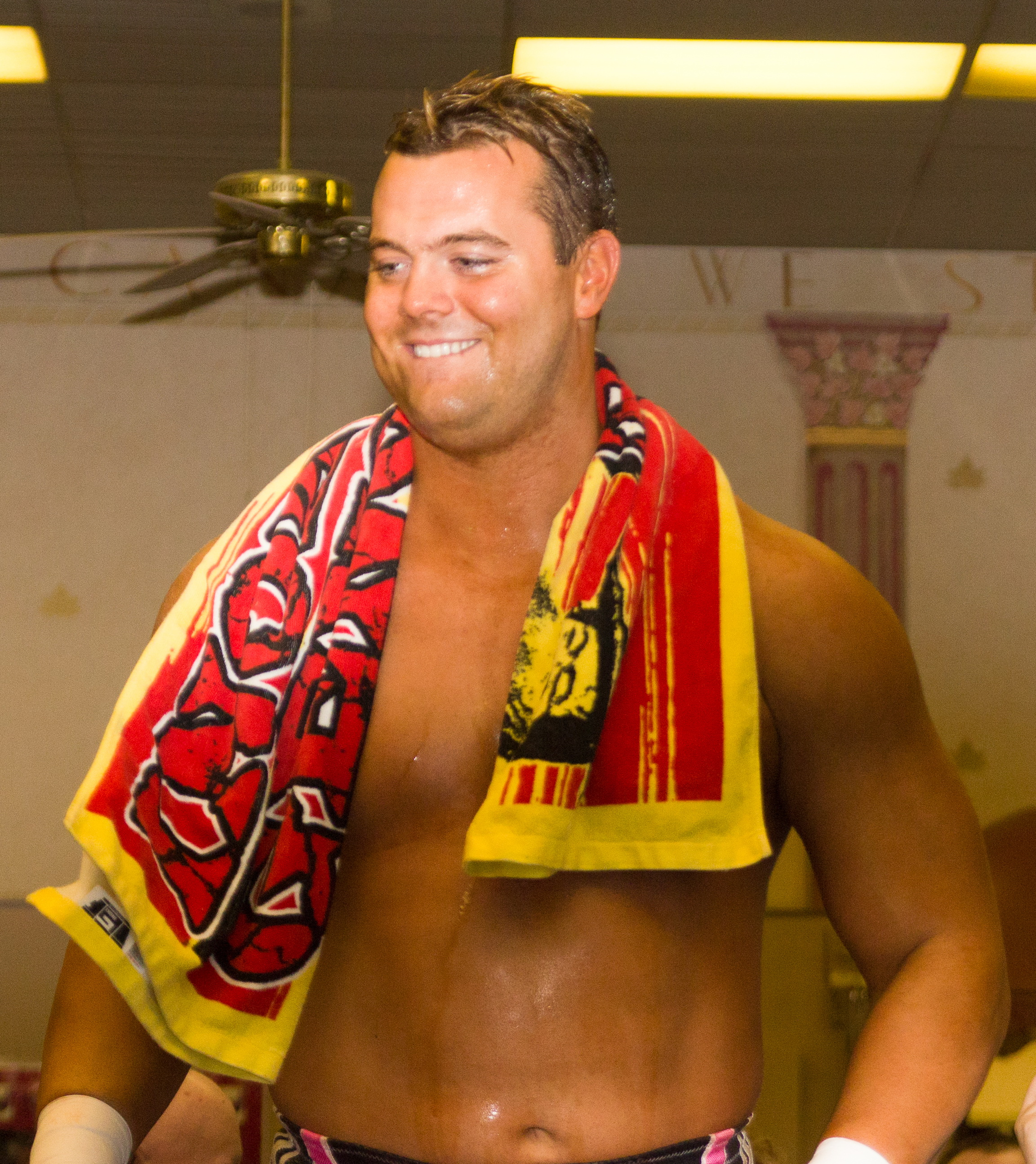
- 2019 winner Davey Boy Smith Jr.
- Promotion: Major League Wrestling
- Date: December 5, 2019
- City: Queens, New York City, New York
- Venue: Melrose Ballroom

Event chronology
← Previous; Blood and Thunder	Next → Zero Hour

Opera Cup chronology
← Previous; First	Next → 2020

Opera Cup (2019) was a professional wrestling supercard event produced by Major League Wrestling (MLW), which took place on December 5, 2019 at the Melrose Ballroom in Queens, New York City, New York. The event was a set of television tapings for Fusion featuring the inaugural namesake Opera Cup single-elimination tournament.

The main event was the final round of the Opera Cup tournament between Davey Boy Smith Jr. and Brian Pillman Jr., which Smith won. In other prominent matches on the undercard, Myron Reed successfully defended the World Middleweight Championship against El Lindaman, Jimmy Havoc defeated Mance Warner in a Prince of Darkness match, Gino Medina defeated Savio Vega in a New York City Street Fight and Contra Unit defeated Strong Hearts.

== Production ==
=== Background ===
Opera House Cup was annually held as a professional wrestling tournament for nearly fifty years in various cities in the United States until 1948, when Stu Hart won the tournament and it was discontinued. Hart kept the possession of the Opera Cup trophy since then. On July 21, 2019, Major League Wrestling announced that it would be holding an event on December 5 at the Melrose Ballroom in Queens, New York City, New York which would be a set of television tapings of MLW's television program Fusion. On July 24, it was reported that Stu Hart's grandson and MLW wrestler Teddy Hart would be donating an inherited "family heirloom" to MLW. On July 30, MLW.com announced that the family heirloom was Stu Hart's Opera Cup trophy and MLW would be bringing back the Opera Cup tournament on the December 5 supercard, naming it Opera Cup.

=== Storylines ===
The card consisted of matches that resulted from scripted storylines, where wrestlers portrayed villains, heroes, or less distinguishable characters in scripted events that built tension and culminated in a wrestling match or series of matches, with results predetermined by MLW's writers. Storylines were played out on MLW's television program Fusion.

On November 13, MLW.com announced that the first match in the opening round of the Opera Cup would feature Brian Pillman Jr. against TJP, who would be making his return to MLW since 2004. The following day, it was announced that as per the decision of the Hart family, The Dynasty members MJF and Alexander Hammerstone would be competing against each other in the opening round of the Opera Cup. On November 18, it was announced that the Hart family member Davey Boy Smith Jr. would be taking on Pro Wrestling Zero1 wrestler Shinjiro Otani in the third match of the Opera Cup tournament. However, Otani withdrew from the tournament and was replaced by Low Ki on December 4. On November 21, the final match in the opening round of the Opera Cup was announced pitting Timothy Thatcher against Dynasty member Richard Holliday.

On November 18, MLW.com reported that Contra Unit was involved in an altercation with Japanese wrestlers during MLW's visit to Japan. The following day, Strong Hearts (Cima, El Lindaman and Shigehiro Irie) issued a challenge to Contra Unit for a match, which was made official for Opera Cup, thus marking the MLW debut of Strong Hearts.

At Saturday Night SuperFight, Mance Warner defeated Jimmy Havoc and Bestia 666 in a Stairway to Hell match but Havoc attacked Warner after the match. The feud between Warner and Havoc continued as the two competed in a Falls Count Anywhere match on the November 23 episode of Fusion, which Warner won but Havoc stabbed a fork in Warner's head after the match. On November 25, MLW.com announced that Havoc and Warner would compete against each other in a Prince of Darkness match at Opera Cup.

On November 26, it was announced that the recently debuted mixed martial artist King Mo would compete in a match at Opera Cup.

On the special Thanksgiving episode of Fusion on November 28, Tom Lawlor turned on Ross Von Erich during his MLW World Heavyweight Championship match against Jacob Fatu by hitting Von Erich with the chair, allowing Fatu to win to retain the title. On December 2, MLW.com reported that Lawlor had demanded a match against a member of Von Erich family, which was denied by Ross and Marshall Von Erich, speculating that a new member of the Von Erich family would be competing against Lawlor at the Opera Cup.

== Results ==
No.	Results	Stipulations
1^{D}	Dr. Dax defeated Maverick Chris Callaway	Singles match
2^{FT}	Brian Pillman Jr. defeated TJP	Opera Cup tournament quarter-final (Fusion – December 14)
3^{FT}	Davey Boy Smith Jr. defeated Low Ki	Opera Cup tournament quarter-final (Fusion – December 21)
4^{FT}	Timothy Thatcher defeated Richard Holliday via submission	Opera Cup tournament quarter-final (Fusion – December 14)
5^{FT}	Alexander Hammerstone defeated MJF	Opera Cup tournament quarter-final (Fusion – December 21)
6^{FT}	Tom Lawlor defeated Rip Von Erich via submission	Singles match (Fusion – January 4)
7^{FT}	Myron Reed (c) defeated El Lindaman	Singles match for the MLW World Middleweight Championship
8^{FT}	A. C. H. and King Mo defeated Jordan Oliver and Kotto Brazil	Tag team match (Fusion – December 14)
9^{FT}	Brian Pillman Jr. defeated Timothy Thatcher	Opera Cup tournament semi-final
10^{FT}	Davey Boy Smith Jr. defeated Alexander Hammerstone (with Richard Holliday)	Opera Cup tournament semi-final (Fusion – January 4)
11^{FT}	The Von Erichs (Ross and Marshall) defeated The Spirit Squad (Kenn Doane and Mike Mondo)	Tag team match
12^{FT}	Jimmy Havoc defeated Mance Warner	Prince of Darkness match (Fusion – December 21)
13^{FT}	Gino Medina defeated Savio Vega	New York City Street Fight
14^{FT}	Contra Unit (Jacob Fatu, Ikuro Kwon and Simon Gotch) defeated Strong Hearts (Cima, El Lindaman and Shigehiro Irie)	Six-man tag team match (Fusion – January 4)
15^{FT}	Davey Boy Smith Jr. defeated Brian Pillman Jr. via submission	Opera Cup tournament final
(c) / – the champion(s) heading into the match; D / – this was a dark match; FT / – the match was taped for a future broadcast of Fusion

Opera Cup (2019)
- Venue: Melrose Ballroom
- Location: Queens, New York, New York
- Start date: December 5, 2019
- Competitors: Alexander Hammerstone; Brian Pillman Jr.; Jordan Oliver (alternate); Kotto Brazil (alternate); Low Ki; MJF; Myron Reed (alternate); Richard Holliday; Timothy Thatcher; TJP

Champion
- Davey Boy Smith Jr.

=== Tournament brackets ===
Quarterfinals
Davey Boy Smith Jr.
Low Ki
Alexander Hammerstone
MJF
Timothy Thatcher
Richard Holliday
Brian Pillman Jr.
TJP

Semifinals
Davey Boy Smith Jr.
Alexander Hammerstone
Timothy Thatcher
Brian Pillman Jr.

Final
Davey Boy Smith Jr.
Brian Pillman Jr.
