= Opera Cup (2021) =

2021 Major League Wrestling tournament

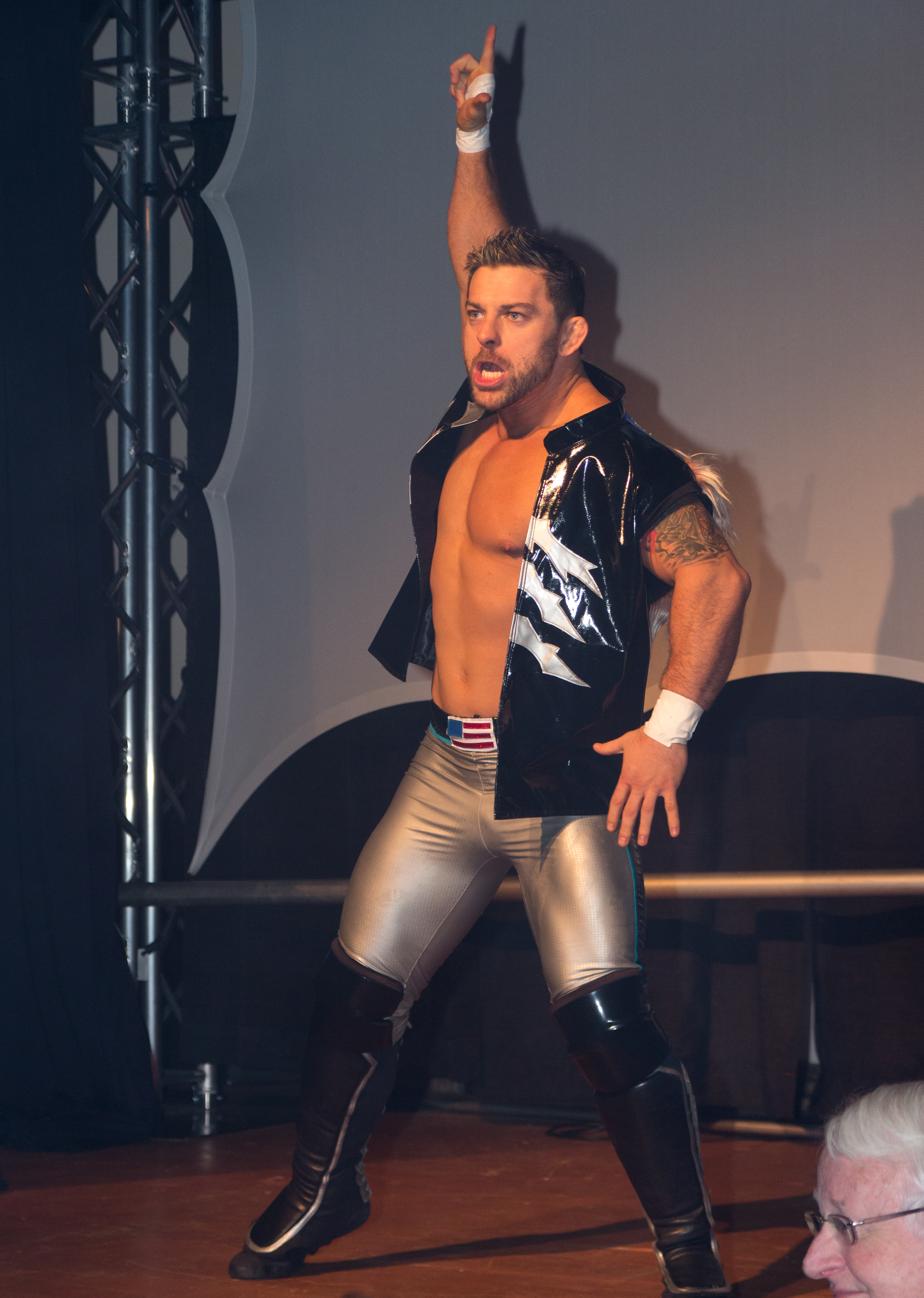
- The 2021 winner Davey Richards
- Venue: 2300 Arena
- Location: Philadelphia, Pennsylvania
- Start date: October 2, 2021
- End date: November 6, 2021
- Competitors: Alex Kane (alternate); Alex Shelley; Bobby Fish; Calvin Tankman; Lee Moriarty; Matt Cross; TJP; Tom Lawlor

Champion
- Davey Richards

Opera Cup (2021) was the third Opera Cup professional wrestling tournament produced by Major League Wrestling (MLW). The first two rounds were held at Fightland on October 2, 2021, while the finals took place at War Chamber on November 6, 2021.

== Production ==
=== Background ===
The Opera House Cup was annually held as a professional wrestling tournament for nearly fifty years in various cities in the United States until its discontinuation in 1948. Stu Hart won the final tournament and kept the possession of the Opera Cup trophy since then. On July 21, 2019, Major League Wrestling announced that it would be holding an event on December 5 at the Melrose Ballroom in Queens, New York City, New York which would be a set of television tapings of MLW's television program Fusion. On July 24, it was reported that Stu Hart's grandson and MLW wrestler Teddy Hart would be donating an inherited "family heirloom" to MLW. On July 30, MLW.com announced that the family heirloom was Stu Hart's Opera Cup trophy and MLW would be bringing back the Opera Cup tournament on the December 5 supercard, naming it Opera Cup.

On August 17, 2021, it was announced on MLW's website that a third Opera Cup would be held in 2021. It was later announced that the first two rounds of the tournament would take place at Fightland on October 2 and the final round would take place on November 6.

=== Storylines ===
The tournament consists of matches that result from scripted storylines, where wrestlers portray villains, heroes, or less distinguishable characters in scripted events that build tension and culminated in a wrestling match or series of matches, with results predetermined by MLW's writers. Storylines were played out on MLW's social media channels and the weekly mini-series, MLW Fusion: Alpha, on MLW's YouTube channel and beIN Sports USA.

On September 5, 2021, the previous year's Opera Cup winner Tom Lawlor pushed for entry into the 2021 tournament. On September 9, the tournament brackets were revealed with the first five participants being Lawlor, Calvin Tankman, Davey Richards, TJP and Matt Cross. On September 13, it was announced that Bobby Fish, who had been recently released by WWE, would be making his MLW debut at Fightland as the sixth participant in the Opera Cup. The following day, it was announced that Lee Moriarty would be the seventh participant in the Opera Cup. Alex Shelley was announced as the final entrant in the Opera Cup.

== Results ==
Quarter-final (October 2)
No.	Results	Stipulations
1	Calvin Tankman defeated Matt Cross	Singles match
2	Bobby Fish defeated Lee Moriarty	Singles match
3	Davey Richards defeated Tom Lawlor via submission	Singles match
4	TJP defeated Alex Shelley	Singles match

Semi-final
No.	Results	Stipulations
1	Davey Richards defeated Bobby Fish	Singles match (October 2)
2	TJP defeated Calvin Tankman	Singles match (November 6)

Final (November 6)
No.	Results	Stipulations
1	Davey Richards defeated TJP	Singles match

=== Tournament brackets ===
The tournament brackets were revealed on September 26, 2021.

Quarterfinals; Fightland (October 2)
Calvin Tankman	Pin
Matt Cross
TJP	Pin
Alex Shelley
Davey Richards	Sub
Tom Lawlor
Bobby Fish	Pin
Lee Moriarty

Semifinals; Fightland (October 2); War Chamber (November 6)
Calvin Tankman	Pin
TJP
Davey Richards	Pin
Bobby Fish

Final; War Chamber (November 6)
TJP
Davey Richards	Pin
