= Opera Cup =

Recurring professional wrestling tournament by MLW

- Promotions: Major League Wrestling
- First event: 2019

The Opera Cup tournament is a professional wrestling single-elimination tournament held by Major League Wrestling (MLW). The event is a revival of the Professional Wrestling Opera House Cup, which had been last held in 1948. MLW hosted their first edition in 2019 and it has since become a recurring event for the promotion.

== History ==
Opera House Cup was annually held as a professional wrestling tournament for nearly fifty years in various cities in the United States until 1948, when Stu Hart won the tournament and it was discontinued. Hart kept the possession of the Opera Cup trophy since then.

On July 21, 2019, Major League Wrestling announced that it would be holding an event on December 5 at the Melrose Ballroom in Queens, New York City, New York which would be a set of television tapings for MLW Fusion. On July 24, it was reported that Stu Hart's grandson and MLW wrestler Teddy Hart would be donating an inherited "family heirloom" to MLW. On July 30, MLW.com announced that the family heirloom was Stu Hart's Opera Cup trophy and MLW would be bringing back the Opera Cup tournament on the December 5 supercard.

== List of winners ==
Year	Winner	Times won	Finals date	Runner-up	Venue	Location
1948	Stu Hart	1	December 5, 1948			Canada
2019	Davey Boy Smith Jr.	1	December 5, 2019	Brian Pillman Jr.	Melrose Ballroom	Queens, New York, New York
2020	Tom Lawlor	1	December 23, 2020	Low Ki	GILT Nightclub	Orlando, Florida
2021	Davey Richards	1	November 6, 2021	TJP	2300 Arena	Philadelphia, Pennsylvania
2023	Davey Boy Smith Jr.	2	April 8, 2023	Tracy Williams	2300 Arena	Philadelphia, Pennsylvania
2024	Místico	1	September 14, 2024	Kenta	Center Stage	Atlanta, Georgia
2025	Místico	2	November 20, 2025	Volador Jr.	Charleston Music Hall	Charleston, South Carolina
2026	Austin Aries	1	September 12, 2026	Matt Riddle	Festival Hall	Charleston, South Carolina
