= MLW Underground Wrestling =

American professional wrestling television program

- Genre: Professional wrestling
- Created by: Court Bauer
- Starring: See Major League Wrestling roster
- Opening theme: “Enemies With Benefits” by VIOLENT IDOLS
- Country of origin: United States
- No. of episodes: 13

Production
- Camera setup: Multiple-camera setup
- Running time: 60 minutes

Original release
- Network: Reelz
- Release: February 7 – May 2, 2023

Related
- MLW Underground TV (2003–2004); MLW Fusion (2018–2023)

MLW Underground Wrestling, also known as MLW Underground, is a professional wrestling television program produced by Major League Wrestling (MLW) that originally premiered on February 7, 2023, on Reelz in the United States. The show takes its name after the promotion's original television series, MLW Underground TV, which was produced from 2003 to 2004.

== History ==
On January 20, 2023, MLW announced a broadcast deal with the American cable channel Reelz to produce a new flagship show titled MLW Underground Wrestling. As part of the agreement, Reelz would also air past MLW content in a two-hour block including the series; a re-edited version of Battle Riot IV (which took place on June 23, 2022, and later aired on November 3, 2022, on the streaming service Pro Wrestling TV) aired immediately after the series premiere.

The premiere episode featured segments from the 2022 Fightland event, which was originally taped for the promotion's other weekly series, MLW Fusion, with the Last Man Standing match between Alexander Hammerstone and EJ Nduka for the MLW World Heavyweight Championship serving as the main event.

On February 28, it was reported by Variety that MLW's deal with Reelz would conclude after 10 weeks. In a statement made to PWInsider, the network confirmed that "No decisions have been made by MLW or REELZ and we are both committed to a good outcome for MLW, its fans and REELZ."

In March 2023, it was announced that Battle Riot V would air on April 25 as an episode of Underground Wrestling.

== Production ==
=== Special episodes ===
Episode	Date	Notes
War Chamber	April 18, 2023	Special broadcast
Battle Riot V	April 25, 2023	Special broadcast

== Broadcast history ==
Though Reelz's linear channel and programming would be picked by NBCUniversal-owned streaming service Peacock shortly after the show's launch, Underground Wrestling and all MLW programming were blacked out on the service due to a pre-existing exclusivity agreement with WWE.

=== International ===
In February 2023, it was announced that Underground Wrestling would air on Ayozat TV in the United Kingdom starting March 6.

On March 23, 2023, it was announced that Premier Streaming Network will distribute Underground Wrestling outside of the U.S.
