= Davey Boy Smith Jr. =

Canadian professional wrestler (born 1985)

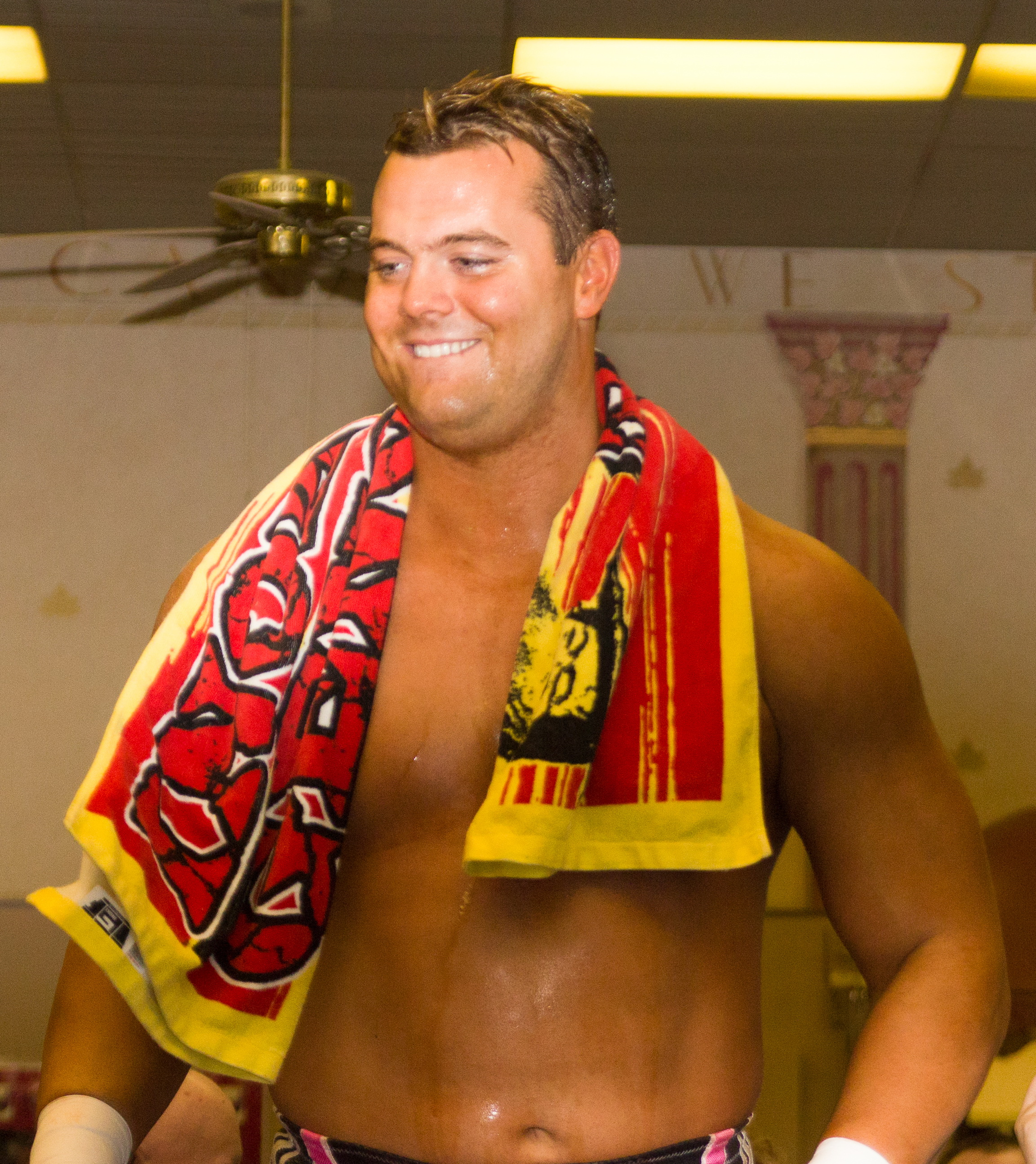
- Smith in 2011

Personal information
- Born: Harry Francis Smith; August 2, 1985 (age 41) Calgary, Alberta, Canada
- Parent(s): Davey Boy Smith (father); Diana Hart (mother)
- Relatives: Harry Smith (great-grandfather); Stu Hart (grandfather); Natalya Neidhart (cousin)
- Family: Hart (maternal); Billington (paternal)

Professional wrestling career
- Ring name(s): Black Assassin; Brakuss; British Bulldog Jr. Bulldog Hart; Davey Boy Smith Jr. David Hart Smith; DH Smith; Harry Smith
- Billed height: 6 ft 5 in (196 cm)
- Billed weight: 260 lb (118 kg)
- Billed from: Calgary, Alberta, Canada
- Trained by: Bruce Hart; Davey Boy Smith; Tokyo Joe; Johnny Smith; Billy Robinson; Josh Barnett
- Debut: 2000

Harry Francis Smith (born August 2, 1985), better known by his ring name Davey Boy Smith Jr., is a Canadian professional wrestler and catch wrestler. He currently performs for Major League Wrestling (MLW), where he is a two-time Opera Cup winner and a former two-time MLW World Tag Team Champion, and All Japan Pro Wrestling (AJPW), where he is a former Triple Crown Heavyweight Champion. He is best known for his time in New Japan Pro-Wrestling (NJPW), where he was a former three-time IWGP Tag Team Champion as part of the Killer Elite Squad with Lance Archer, as well as being a two-time GHC Tag Team Champion in Pro Wrestling Noah (also alongside Archer) due to NJPW's working relationship with Pro Wrestling Noah.

Smith is also known for his time in the National Wrestling Alliance (NWA), where he was a three-time NWA World Tag Team Champion, and WWE from 2006 until 2011 under the ring name David Hart Smith, where he was won Unified Tag Team Championship along with Tyson Kidd as part of The Hart Dynasty. He also performed in WWE's then-developmental territory Florida Championship Wrestling (FCW) under the ring name DH Smith. Smith has also previous appeared for World of Sport Wrestling (WOS Wrestling) under the ring name British Bulldog Jr.

A third generation professional wrestler, he is both the son of "The British Bulldog" Davey Boy Smith and a member of the Hart wrestling family through his mother, Diana Hart, the youngest daughter of promoters Stu Hart (a former wrestler in his own right) and Helen Hart.

== Early life ==
Harry Francis Smith was born on August 2, 1985, in Calgary, Alberta, Canada. He is of predominantly British descent through his father, professional wrestler David Smith who hailed from Greater Manchester, England, and his mother Diana Hart who belongs to a large family of Ulster Scot heritage. Smith also has Greek ancestry through his maternal great-grandmother, Irish ancestry through his maternal great-grandfather, long-distance runner Harry James Smith, and Italian ancestry through his paternal grandmother.

He has a younger sister named Georgia who is a voice over artist and wrestling personality.

Smith's mother Diana is a Hart family member, being the youngest daughter of wrestler Stu Hart and promoter Helen Hart, thus he is the nephew of her eleven siblings, all of whom have been involved in wrestling in one way or another. His maternal cousins Natalya Neidhart, Matthew, Teddy, Matt, Bruce Jr. and Torrin Hart, as well as step-cousin Mike also wrestle or used to wrestle, while Lindsay is an on-air personality. Smith is close with Natalya as the two lived together as children while their fathers were wrestling as a team. He is very good friends with her husband T.J. Wilson whom he shared an apartment with at one point.

His father's family have a history in wrestling. His father and his cousin Thomas "The Dynamite Kid" Billington wrestled as a tag-team for many years and Billington's daughter Bronwyne is a wrestling valet. He is second cousin to Dynamite's two nephews Thomas Billington II and Mark Billington II, who are wrestlers as well.

== Professional wrestling career ==
=== Early years (1994–2006) ===
Smith began wrestling at the age of eight, he was first trained by his father Davey Boy Smith and uncle Bruce Hart. Smith started training with Tokyo Joe during high school, crediting the training for preparing him to wrestle in Japan. He made an early appearance with the then World Wrestling Federation (now WWE) on October 5, 1996, at the age of 11 when he teamed with his cousin Ted Annis against TJ Wilson and Andrew Picarnia at a WWF house show in Calgary.

He appeared at the conclusion of In Your House 16: Canadian Stampede with the rest of the Hart family. He made his professional debut at the age of fifteen at the Rockyford Rodeo, and became a mainstay of the Calgary-based Stampede Wrestling promotion. In May 2002, Smith teamed with his father on two occasions, shortly before his father died. Smith was offered a contract with World Wrestling Entertainment in the summer of 2004, but opted to attend college and wrestle in Japan before signing.

In 2004, Smith began teaming with TJ Wilson as "The Stampede Bulldogs", a reference to "The British Bulldogs", the tag team composed of his father and his father's first cousin the Dynamite Kid. In the same year, Smith formed a stable known as The Hart Foundation Version 2.0 with Wilson, Jack Evans, and Teddy Hart. The Hart Foundation Version 2.0 initially performed in Stampede Wrestling before expanding to the United States, where they competed in Major League Wrestling.

Smith traveled to England in January 2006, appearing with One Pro Wrestling at No Turning Back on January 6, 2006. Smith was billed as the mystery opponent of NWA World Heavyweight Champion Jeff Jarrett, ostensibly hand-picked by his uncle, Bret Hart.

=== New Japan Pro-Wrestling (2005) ===
In January 2005, Smith went on a five-week tour of Japan, wrestling with New Japan Pro-Wrestling as "Black Assassin" and suffered a broken hand in the process. Later that year, Smith left Stampede Wrestling and wrestled several dark matches for World Wrestling Entertainment (WWE), before embarking upon a second tour of Japan. He returned to Stampede Wrestling in October 2005, and on November 25, 2005, was defeated by T.J. Wilson in the finals of a tournament for the vacant North American Heavyweight Championship.

=== World Wrestling Entertainment / WWE (2006–2011) ===
==== Developmental territories (2006–2007) ====
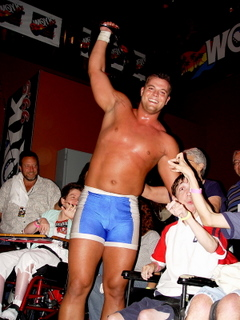
When Smith signed with WWE, he trained in Florida Championship Wrestling, where he won the FCW Southern Heavyweight Championship

On April 1, 2006, Smith and several of his relatives attended the induction of Bret Hart into the WWE Hall of Fame. While there, Smith met with WWE executives, John Laurinaitis and Carl De Marco, and signed a developmental contract with on April 4, 2006. He wrestled dark matches for the company before his debut, defeating wrestlers like Rob Conway and Mike Knox, and losing to Randy Orton.

Harry debuted in Ohio Valley Wrestling (OVW), at the February 14, 2007 television tapings, in a tag team match with Kofi Nahaje Kingston, in which they defeated The Belgium Brawler and Nicholas Sinn. At the following taping, the duo of Harry and Kofi became collectively known as the Commonwealth Connection and faced La Résistance in a losing effort. Smith was then sent to Deep South Wrestling (DSW), where he reformed the "Stampede Bulldogs" with T.J. Wilson.

After WWE ended its relationship with DSW, Smith moved to Florida Championship Wrestling (FCW). On June 26, Smith won a 21-man battle royal to become the first ever FCW Southern Heavyweight Champion.

Smith then joined up with his cousins Teddy Hart and Nattie Neidhart to form the Next Generation Hart Foundation. They debuted in a six-person mixed tag team match, losing to Mike Kruel, Vladimir Kozlov and Milena Roucka. They were later victorious in a non-title match against the OVW Southern Tag Team Champions, the James Boys. Smith then returned to FCW to form another version of the New Hart Foundation, along with Hart, Wilson and Ted DiBiase Jr. He appeared in a winning effort against Carlito in a dark match during a taping of Raw in the United Kingdom.

On October 16, Smith lost the FCW Southern Heavyweight Championship to Afa Jr. He was unable to make the referee's ten count and was counted out, due to being in the United Kingdom with WWE.

==== Early appearances (2006–2008) ====
In mid-2006, Smith appeared on Raw, despite not being part of the main roster, in a segment where he and others in the locker room chased away ECW invaders. He then was not seen again on the main roster in over a year.

He made his television debut as "DH Smith" on the October 22, 2007 episode of Raw, defeating Carlito using his father's trademark running powerslam. He dedicated the match to his father. On October 29, Smith and Jeff Hardy defeated Carlito and Mr. Kennedy.

On November 2, 2007, it was reported that Smith had been suspended for 30 days due to violations of "WWE's Substance Abuse and Drug Testing Policy". Smith returned to the active roster on December 17 by defeating Charlie Haas on Heat. After his return, Smith would wrestle primarily on Heat.

As part of the WWE Supplemental Draft on June 25, 2008, Smith was drafted to the SmackDown brand. Smith, however, returned to Florida Championship Wrestling (FCW) on August 26, without making his SmackDown debut. He made the decision to return to FCW on a full-time basis so he could mature, and put more effort into developing his in-ring work and his personality. On October 30, Smith won the FCW Florida Tag Team Championship with TJ Wilson, defeating Joe Hennig and Sebastian Slater, but they lost it to Tyler Reks and Johnny Curtis on December 11, 2008, at the FCW television taping.

==== The Hart Dynasty (2009–2011) ====
On April 15, 2009, Smith was drafted to the ECW brand as part of the 2009 Supplemental Draft, without making any appearances on SmackDown. Smith made his ECW debut on May 12, as a villain, attacking Finlay during Finlay's match with Tyson Kidd (TJ Wilson), using the name David Hart Smith. Smith, Kidd and Natalya formed a new version of The Hart Foundation, named The Hart Trilogy at first, although on the May 27 episode of ECW, the name was tweaked to The Hart Dynasty. Smith was victorious in his first match for ECW, defeating Finlay on the May 19 episode, with help from Kidd and Natalya.

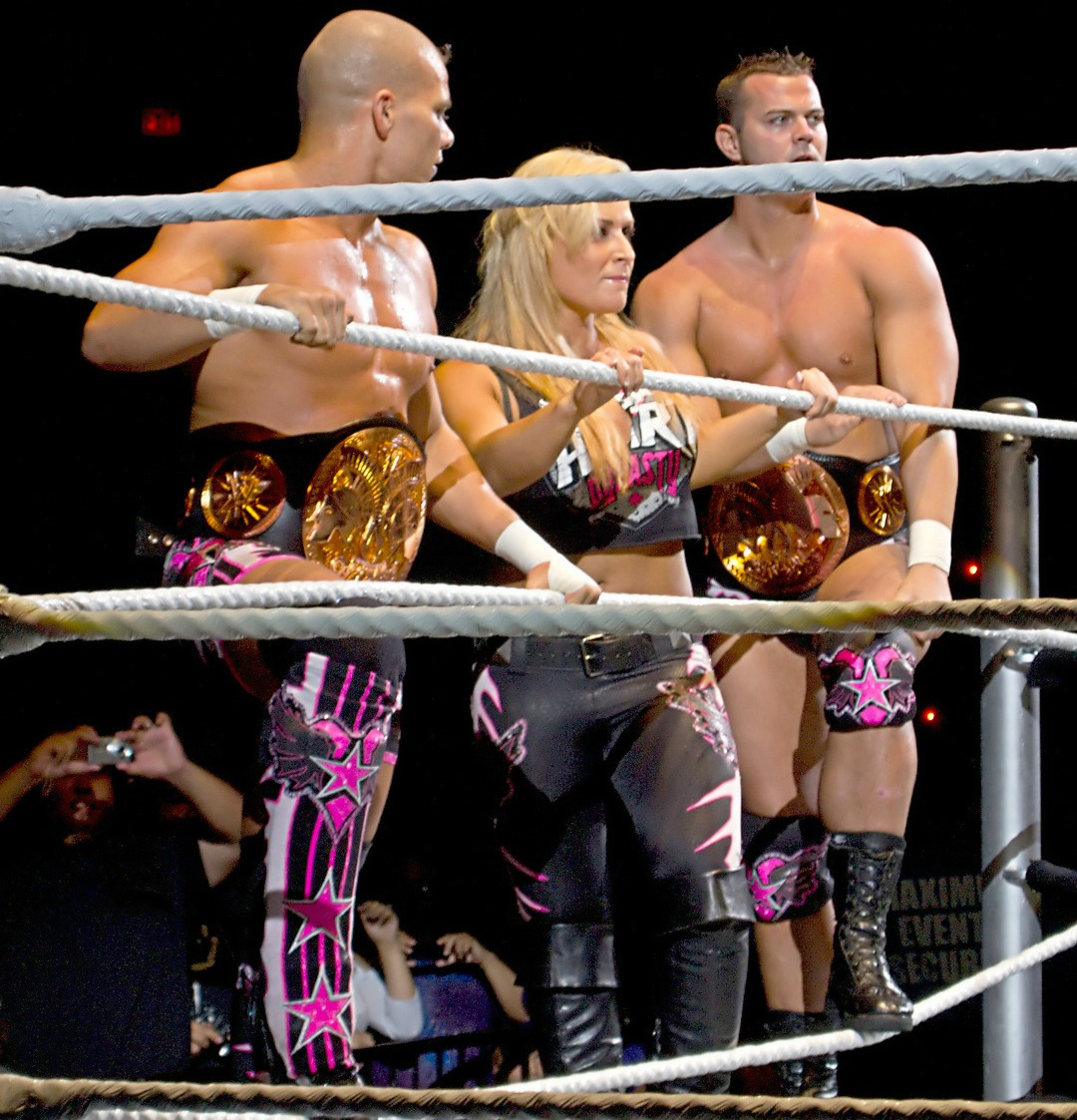
The Hart Dynasty (from left to right) Tyson Kidd, Natalya, and Smith as the WWE Tag Team Champions in August 2010

On June 29, The Hart Dynasty were traded to the SmackDown brand, and entered a feud with Cryme Tyme. At the WWE Bragging Rights pay-per-view in October, Smith and Kidd competed in a seven-on-seven tag match with Chris Jericho, Kane, Finlay, Matt Hardy and R-Truth as Team SmackDown to defeat Team Raw. In December 2009, they challenged D-Generation X for the Unified WWE Tag Team Championship, but were unsuccessful.

The Hart Dynasty appeared at WrestleMania XXVI, first competing in a battle royal which was won by Yoshi Tatsu then helping Bret Hart during his match against Vince McMahon, and the following night on Raw they defeated the Unified WWE Tag Team Champions ShoMiz (Big Show and The Miz) in a non-title match at Hart's behest, effectively turning face in the process. At the Extreme Rules pay-per-view, Smith and Kidd earned a Unified Tag Team Championship match by defeating ShoMiz in a tag team gauntlet match (which also included the team of John Morrison and R-Truth and the team of Montel Vontavious Porter and Mark Henry). During the 2010 WWE Draft on the April 26 episode of Raw, The Hart Dynasty, accompanied by Natalya and Hart, defeated ShoMiz to win the Unified Tag Team Championship, when Kidd made The Miz submit to the Sharpshooter.

The following day, all three members of The Hart Dynasty were moved to the Raw brand as part of the Supplemental Draft. On the May 10 episode of Raw, he was defeated by Chris Jericho, granting Jericho and The Miz a shot for the Unified WWE Tag Team Championship at Over the Limit, but The Hart Dynasty were able to retain. The following night, on May 24, they were attacked by The Usos (Jimmy and Jey) and Tamina, provoking a feud.

At Fatal 4-Way, The Hart Dynasty defeated The Usos and Tamina in a six-person mixed tag team match when Natalya pinned Tamina, and Smith and Kidd defeated The Usos at Money in the Bank to retain the championships when Smith made Jimmy Uso submit to the Sharpshooter. At Night of Champions, The Hart Dynasty lost the WWE Tag Team Championship to Cody Rhodes and Drew McIntyre in a Tag Team Turmoil match which also involved The Usos, Vladimir Kozlov and Santino Marella, and the team of Evan Bourne and Mark Henry.

After a failed attempt to regain the championship, in which Kidd was pushed off balance during their double-team Hart Attack move, Kidd and Smith began to have a falling out with one another. This culminated on the November 15 episode of Raw, when Kidd refused to tag in and attacked Smith during a match for the WWE Tag Team Championship against The Nexus (Justin Gabriel and Heath Slater). ending their partnership. On the December 2 episode of WWE Superstars, Smith beat Kidd in a singles match. Afterward, Smith offered to shake Kidd's hand, but Kidd slapped him across the face. On the next episode of Raw, Kidd defeated Smith in a rematch.

When I was in WWE I lost the passion and when I left WWE, I thought that my career was done.

— Harry Smith in 2013

After losing to Kidd, Smith would be restricted to appearing on Superstars, mostly participating in tag team matches with Yoshi Tatsu or Darren Young. Smith's last match was on the April 28 edition of Superstars, where he lost to Zack Ryder. After months of inactivity, Smith was released from his contract with WWE on August 5, 2011. His release (as well as the releases of Chris Masters and Vladimir Kozlov) was referenced in a worked shoot moment on the August 8 episode of Raw by WWE Champion CM Punk.

=== Independent circuit (2011–present) ===
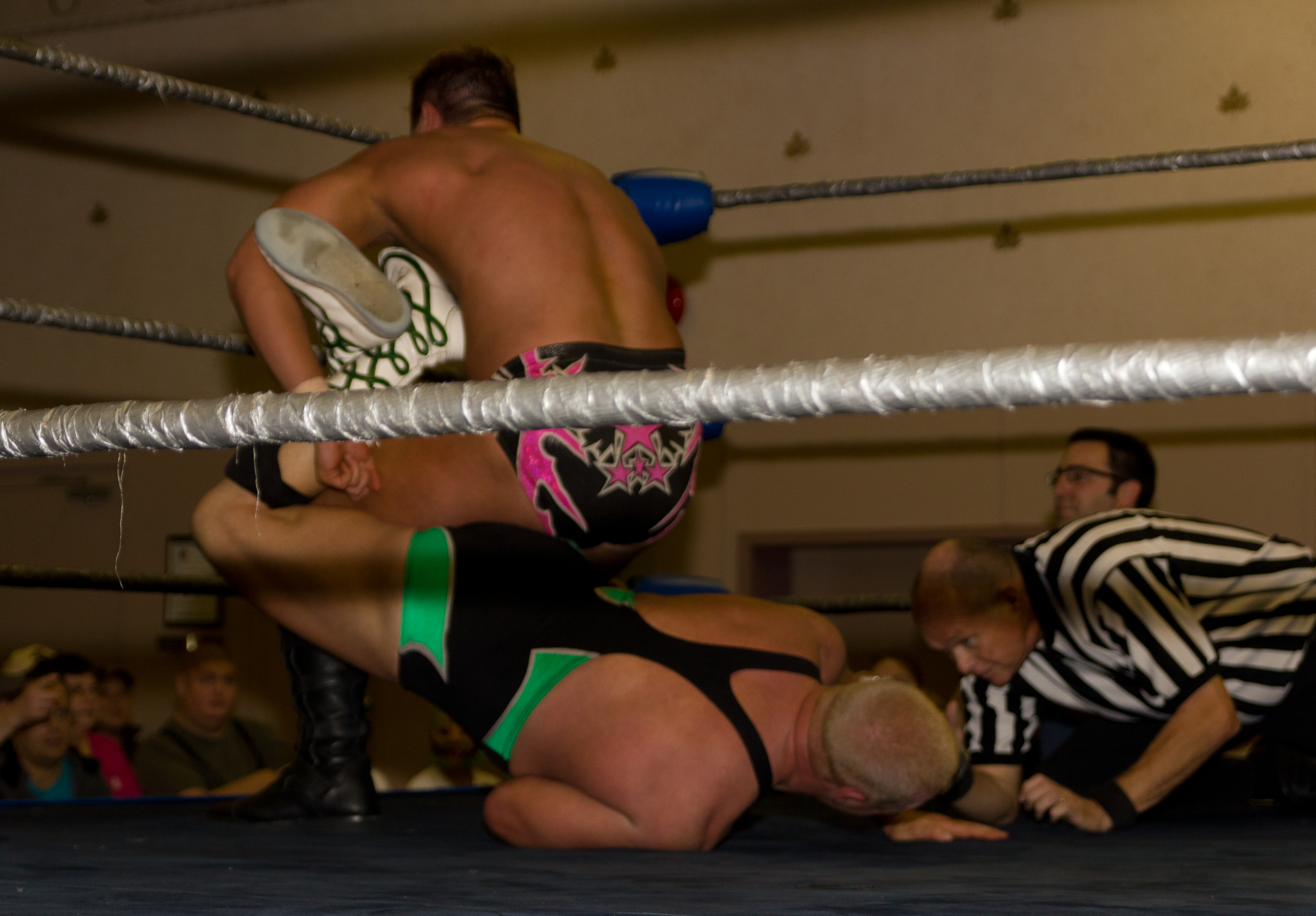
Smith locks Fit Finlay into the Sharpshooter in November 2011

On August 20, 2011, Smith, working under his real name, made his return to the independent circuit defeating Dan Maff at Pro Wrestling Syndicate. On August 27, 2011, Smith, working under his real name, made his debut for Japanese Inoki Genome Federation (IGF), losing to Hideki Suzuki. On September 3, he teamed with Bobby Lashley in a losing effort against Kendo Kashin and Kazuyuki Fujita. On November 6, Smith wrestled in the main event of a Stampede Wrestling show in Barrie, Ontario, defeating Fit Finlay.

In December 2011, Smith took part in Total Nonstop Action Wrestling's India project, Ring Ka King under the ring name Bulldog Hart. During the first week of tapings, Hart and Chavo Guerrero Jr. were crowned the promotion's inaugural Tag Team Champions. On January 19, in their first defence of the titles they lost to two members of RDX, Scott Steiner and Abyss.

On January 20, Smith teamed up with Chavo, Jwala, Mahabali Veera and Matt Morgan to take on Abyss, Deadly Danda, Scott Steiner, Sir Brutus Magnus and Sonjay Dutt in World Cup Of Ring Ka King steel cage match and won. On January 29, 2012, Smith made an appearance for Pro Wrestling Guerrilla (PWG), teaming with Davey Richards in a tag team match, where they were defeated by The Young Bucks (Matt and Nick Jackson).

On January 13, 2012, Smith defeated The Almighty Sheik and Kevin Steen to become the first Heavyweight Champion of Resistance Pro Wrestling promotion. Over the next few months, Smith took on Rhino in matches culminating on May 11, in a steel cage match with special referee Raven which Smith won. However, the title was stripped on October 14, 2012.

On May 17, 2017 he defeated Maxx Testosterone in a cage match for Great North Wrestling in Smith Falls, Ontario. He defeated former WWE wrestler Nunzio for Great North Wrestling in Smith Falls, Ontario on July 15, 2023.

On June 28, 2024, Smith challenged Innovative Hybrid Wrestling Champion "The King" JP Simms for the IHW Championship at the Riverview Sunfest.

=== Return to NJPW (2012–2019) ===
==== IWGP and NWA World Tag Team Champions (2012–2014) ====
On August 13, 2012, New Japan Pro-Wrestling announced that Smith would be returning to the promotion the following month as a member of Minoru Suzuki's Suzuki-gun stable, forming a regular tag team with stablemate Lance Archer. Smith said that New Japan wanted a huge monster as Archer's partner. Also, he received a good offer from All Japan Pro Wrestling, but he chose NJPW due to the previous relationship. Smith wrestled his return match on September 7, when he, Lance Archer, Minoru Suzuki and Taka Michinoku were defeated in an eight-man tag team match by Hiroyoshi Tenzan, Satoshi Kojima, Togi Makabe and Yuji Nagata, following a disqualification.

On September 9, Smith submitted IWGP Tag Team Champion Hiroyoshi Tenzan in another eight-man tag team match, after which he and Archer, dubbing themselves K.E.S. (Killer Elite Squad), made a challenge for his and Satoshi Kojima's title. On September 24, New Japan renamed Smith "Davey Boy Smith Jr.". On October 8 at King of Pro-Wrestling, K.E.S. defeated Kojima and Tenzan to win the IWGP Tag Team Championship. K.E.S. made their first successful title defense on November 11 at Power Struggle, defeating Tenzan and Kojima in a rematch. From November 20 to December 1, K.E.S. took part in the round-robin portion of the 2012 World Tag League, finishing with a record of four wins and two losses, advancing to the semifinals of the tournament in the second place in their group.

On December 2, K.E.S. defeated Always Hypers (Togi Makabe and Wataru Inoue) to advance to the finals of the tournament. Later that same day, K.E.S. was defeated in the finals of the 2012 World Tag League by Sword & Guns (Hirooki Goto and Karl Anderson). On January 4, 2013, at Wrestle Kingdom 7 in Tokyo Dome, K.E.S. defeated Sword & Guns in a rematch to retain the IWGP Tag Team Championship. On February 10 at The New Beginning, Smith and Archer defeated Tenzan and Kojima for their third successful defense of the IWGP Tag Team Championship. On March 11, Smith entered the 2013 New Japan Cup, defeating IWGP Intercontinental Champion Shinsuke Nakamura in his first round match. Smith's main event win over the former three-time IWGP Heavyweight Champion was referred to as the biggest of his career.

Six days later, Smith advanced to the semifinals of the tournament with a win over Yujiro Takahashi. On March 23, Smith was eliminated from the tournament in the semifinals by Hirooki Goto. On April 5, Smith and Archer made their fourth successful defense of the IWGP Tag Team Championship against Shinsuke Nakamura and Tomohiro Ishii. Two days later at Invasion Attack, Smith unsuccessfully challenged Nakamura for the IWGP Intercontinental Championship. On April 20, Smith and Archer defeated Ryan Genesis and Scot Summers in Houston, Texas to retain the IWGP Tag Team Championship, and win the NWA World Tag Team Championship. On May 3 at Wrestling Dontaku 2013, K.E.S. lost the IWGP Tag Team Championship back to Tencozy in a four-way match, which also included Takashi Iizuka and Toru Yano, and Manabu Nakanishi and Strong Man, though neither Smith nor Archer was involved in the finish.

K.E.S. received a rematch for the title on June 22 at Dominion 6.22 in a three-way match, which also included Iizuka and Yano, but were unable to regain the title, when Kojima pinned Archer for the win. On August 1, Smith entered the 2013 G1 Climax. The tournament concluded on August 11 with a match, where Smith was defeated by his tag team partner Lance Archer, costing him a spot in the finals and ending his tournament with a record of five wins and four losses.

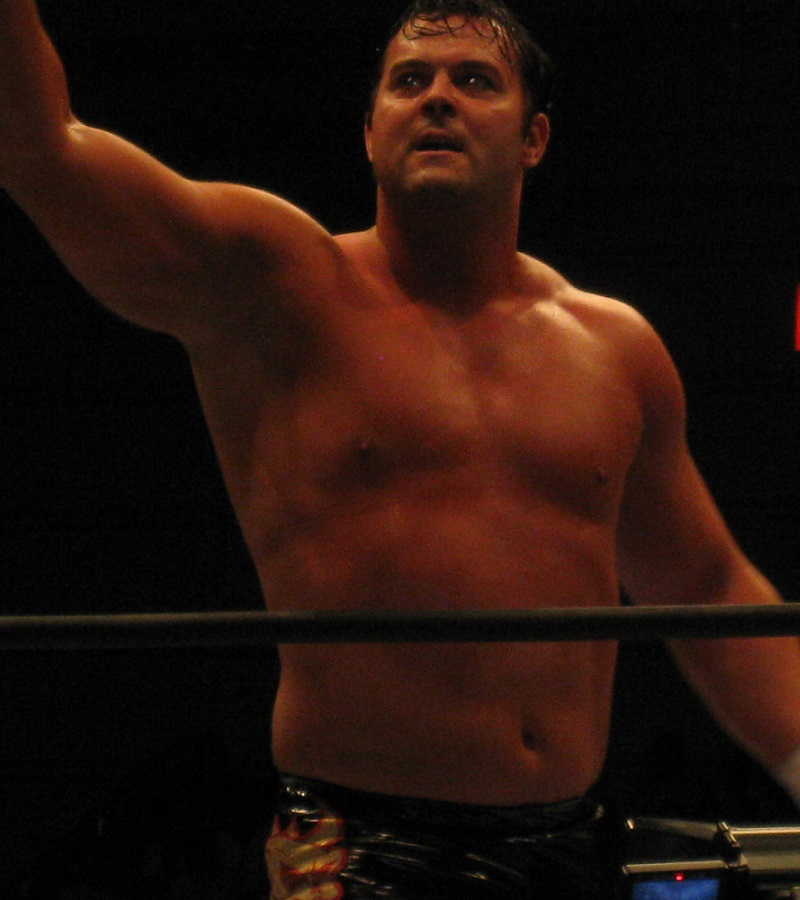
Smith in June 2014

On November 9 at Power Struggle, K.E.S. faced Tencozy and The IronGodz (Jax Dane and Rob Conway) in a two-fall three-way match. In the first fall, they lost the NWA World Tag Team Championship to Dane and Conway, but came back in the second to defeat Tencozy for the IWGP Tag Team Championship. From November 24 to December 8, K.E.S. took part in the 2013 World Tag League. After winning their round-robin block with a record of five wins and one loss, they were eliminated from the tournament in the semifinals by their old rivals, Tencozy.

On January 4, 2014, at Wrestle Kingdom 8 in Tokyo Dome, K.E.S. lost the IWGP Tag Team Championship to the winners of the tournament, Bullet Club (Doc Gallows and Karl Anderson). K.E.S. received a rematch for the title on February 9 at The New Beginning in Hiroshima, but were again defeated by Bullet Club. On May 25 at Back to the Yokohama Arena, K.E.S. failed to regain the NWA World Tag Team Championship from Tencozy in a three-way match, which also included Rob Conway and Wes Brisco.

On June 21 at Dominion 6.21, K.E.S. received another shot at the NWA World Tag Team Championship, this time in a regular tag team match, but were again defeated by Tencozy. From July 23 to August 8, Smith took part in the 2014 G1 Climax, where he finished eighth out of the eleven wrestlers in his block with a record of five wins and five losses, scoring a big win over Hiroshi Tanahashi on the final day. On October 13 at King of Pro-Wrestling, K.E.S. defeated Tencozy to regain the NWA World Tag Team Championship. From November 22 to December 5, K.E.S. took part in the 2014 World Tag League. The team finished their block with a record of four wins and three losses, narrowly missing the finals of the tournament.

==== Pro Wrestling Noah invasion (2015–2016) ====
On January 10, 2015, K.E.S., along with the rest of Suzuki-gun, took part in a major storyline, where the stable invaded a Pro Wrestling Noah show. During the attack, K.E.S. beat down GHC Tag Team Champions TMDK (Mikey Nicholls and Shane Haste). This led to a match on February 11, where K.E.S. defeated TMDK to become the new GHC Tag Team Champions. In May, K.E.S. made it to the finals of the 2015 Global Tag League, where they were defeated by Masato Tanaka and Takashi Sugiura.

After ten successful title defenses, K.E.S. lost the GHC Tag Team Championship to Naomichi Marufuji and Toru Yano on May 28, 2016. K.E.S. regained the title from Marufuji and Yano on November 23. They lost the title to Go Shiozaki and Maybach Taniguchi on December 3. Two days later, it was announced that Suzuki-gun was gone from Noah, concluding the invasion storyline.

==== Return from Noah and departure (2017–2019) ====
The entire Suzuki-gun returned to NJPW on January 5, 2017, attacking the Chaos stable with K.E.S. targeting IWGP Tag Team Champions Tomohiro Ishii and Toru Yano. On February 5 at The New Beginning in Sapporo, K.E.S. unsuccessfully challenged Ishii and Yano for the IWGP Tag Team Championship in a three-way match, also involving Togi Makabe and Tomoaki Honma. K.E.S. were primed for a run as NJPW's top foreign tag team, but the plan was changed when Archer was forced to undergo surgery on a herniated disc in his back.

Following Archer's return to NJPW in August, he and Smith defeated War Machine and Guerrillas of Destiny in a three-way tornado tag team match on September 24 at Destruction in Kobe to win the IWGP Tag Team Championship for the third time. At the end of the year, K.E.S. took part in the 2017 World Tag League, where they finished with a record of five wins and two losses, failing to advance to the finals due to losing to block winners Guerrillas of Destiny in their head-to-head match. On January 4, 2018, at Wrestle Kingdom 12 in Tokyo Dome, K.E.S. lost the IWGP Tag Team Championship to Los Ingobernables de Japón (Evil and Sanada).

Smith would work in NJPW during the following year, usually in multi-man matches. He lost against Toru Yano in the first round of the 2018 New Japan Cup and faced the IWGP Tag Team Champions Los Ingobernables de Japón at Wrestling Honokuni. Smith and Archer participated in the 2018 World Tag League, but they failed to win the tournament. He would lose again against Toru Yano in the first round of the 2019's New Japan Cup. On June 15, 2019, it was reported that Smith would no longer be wrestling for NJPW.

=== Major League Wrestling (2018–2020) ===
In 2018 Smith begun wrestling for Major League Wrestling as a member of New Era Hart Foundation with Teddy Hart and Brian Pillman Jr. Their first feud was against the team of Rich Swann and A. C. H., whom they defeated on an episode of Fusion resulting in a concussion for Swann. On the November 2, edition of Fusion the Hart Foundation beat ACH, Swann and Marko Stunt in a six-man tag team match. From there they began feuding with the MLW World Tag Team Champions Lucha Brothers (Pentagon Jr. and Fenix). On January 2, 2019, it was revealed Smith signed a multi-year deal with Major League Wrestling. In the company's statement, they said he would continue to compete in Japan. At SuperFight on February 2, Smith and Hart defeated Lucha Brothers for the MLW World Tag Team Championship. On July 6, Hart and Pillman Jr. lost the titles to The Dynasty (MJF and Richard Holliday) in a ladder match, which aired on the July 13 episode of Fusion.

On the December 2, 2020 episode of Fusion, Smith lost to Low Ki in the opening round of the Opera Cup. Following his loss, MLW owner Court Bauer announced in a press conference that Smith would be leaving MLW.

=== Return to WWE (2020–2021) ===
On February 12, 2020, Smith would appear live via webcam on an episode of WWE's online talk show, The Bump, appearing alongside former tag team partner Tyson Kidd. On March 12, during the After the Bell podcast hosted by Corey Graves, it was announced that Smith's father, Davey Boy Smith would be going into the 2020 Hall of Fame class, but the event was postponed to the following year due to the COVID-19 pandemic. On April 6, 2021, Smith, along with his family, represented his father at the WWE Hall of Fame ceremony by accepting the award on his behalf. After wrestling in a dark match before SmackDown on July 16, 2021, it was announced that Smith had signed a contract with WWE. However, he was released on November 4 without appearing on television.

Smith has since confirmed the scrapped plans for his WWE return. Smith claimed that he was due to re-debut for the company as "The Stampede Stud" for the SmackDown brand. However, after missing several weeks of WWE television tapings due to catching COVID-19, he was released before the debut could come to fruition.

=== National Wrestling Alliance (2022) ===
On March 19, 2022, at Crockett Cup, Smith made his NWA debut as Doug Williams' tag partner defeating Alex Taylor and Rush Freeman in the first round of the Crockett Cup. On March 22, Smith and Williams were defeated by The Briscoe Brothers in the finals of the Crockett Cup. On June 11, Smith & Doug Williams, now called the Commonwealth Connection defeated La Rebelión to win the NWA World Tag Team Championship. On August 27, 2022, Smith and Williams vacated the titles when Smith suffered an illness that prevented him from defending the titles.

=== Return to MLW (2022–present) ===
Davey Boy Smith Jr. returned to Major League Wrestling for the first time in two years at the Fightland event, teaming with The Billington Bulldogs (Thomas and Mark Billington) defeating The Bomaye Fight Club (Alex Kane, Myron Reed and Mr. Thomas). Smith defeated Calvin Tankman in the semifinals and Tracy Williams in the finals on the 2023 Opera Cup.

On February 29, 2024, at Intimidation Games, Smith and Tom Lawlor defeated The Second Gear Crew (Matthew Justice and 1 Called Manders) to win the MLW World Tag Team Championship. However, they vacated the titles two months later.

=== All Japan Pro Wrestling (2023–present) ===
Smith was expected to make his All Japan Pro Wrestling (AJPW) debut in the 2020 Champion Carnival but was unable to travel to Japan for the show due to the COVID-19 pandemic.

Smith made his AJPW debut on December 31, 2023, where he teamed with Hokuto Omori and Minoru Suzuki to defeat Baka No Jidai (Hideki Suzuki, Hikaru Sato, and Suwama). He took part in the 2024 Champion Carnival where he ended with 5 wins and 1 loss, losing the deciding match against Kento Miyahara and getting eliminated.

On November 4, 2024, Smith defeated Yuma Aoyagi to capture the Triple Crown Heavyweight Championship for the first time and his first world championship in a major promotion. He teamed with Kento Miyahara in the Real World Tag League, where they won all their matches to make it to the semi-finals. After defeating Rising HAYATO and Yuma Anzai, they lost to the Saito Brothers (Jun and Rei Saito) in the final. On December 31, Smith lost his championship to Jun Saito, ending his reign at 57 days.

== Submission wrestling career ==
In 2003, Smith became interested in mixed martial arts and submission wrestling and sought out Johnny Smith, a retired wrestler and Calgary police officer, to teach him legitimate techniques. He met catch wrestling legend Billy Robinson, who had also taught his trainer Tokyo Joe, during Smith's first tour with NJPW in 2005. He took the opportunity to train under the veteran Robinson in Tokyo despite having an injured hand at the time. Robinson would continue to coach and mentor Smith until his passing in 2014.

Also in 2005, Smith met catch wrestler, UFC and Pancrase champion Josh Barnett at an independent show in Seattle, and began training with Barnett when he returned months later. Smith and Barnett later demonstrated techniques with Robinson in a DVD instructional, and Smith became an assistant catch wrestling coach under Robinson in 2011. He has trained with Pancrase co-founder Minoru Suzuki as well. He originally intended to pursue a career in MMA after being released from WWE in 2011 and trained at Dave Batista's Gracie Fighter Tampa school.

Smith entered his first submission grappling competition in December 2012, winning the super heavyweight division at a NAGA tournament. In August 2016, he won the expert level super heavyweight division at NAGA in Las Vegas, coached by Barnett and Erik Paulson. In July 2018, Smith won the heavyweight division at the Billy Robinson Classic catch wrestling tournament, again coached by Barnett.

Smith also trained in MMA with Jake Hager in 2019.

== Personal life ==
Smith lists his father, his uncles Bret Hart and Owen Hart, and Shawn Michaels as his influences. He also cites Ted DiBiase as a big influence. Smith appeared on an episode of Hogan Knows Best, taking Brooke Hogan on a kayfabe date.

Smith was involved in a minor controversy over steroids, when, discussing how his father's drug abuse contributed to his death, Smith commented "I hope to be as big as him someday", leading to concerns over Smith using steroids. Smith claimed that the remarks were taken out of context and that he had learned from his father's mistakes.

On October 16, 2015, Smith announced he acquired the trademark to the "British Bulldog" moniker famously used by his father, and subsequently began wrestling as "British Bulldog" Davey Boy Smith Jr.

In October 2017, Smith saved the life of a suicidal woman in Calgary by stopping her from jumping off a bridge. He credited his years of grappling experience with being able to pull her away from the edge and pin her down so she was not a danger to herself and others until emergency services arrived.

In April 2018, at a WrestleCon event in New Orleans, Louisiana, Smith threw a cup of coffee at Jake "The Snake" Roberts' face during a verbal argument, before fleeing the scene. According to Smith, Roberts refused to apologize for derogatory comments he had recently made toward his late father. Smith was wanted by the New Orleans Police Department for battery. Roberts later dropped the charges after Smith apologized and they spoke in person.

== Championships and accomplishments ==
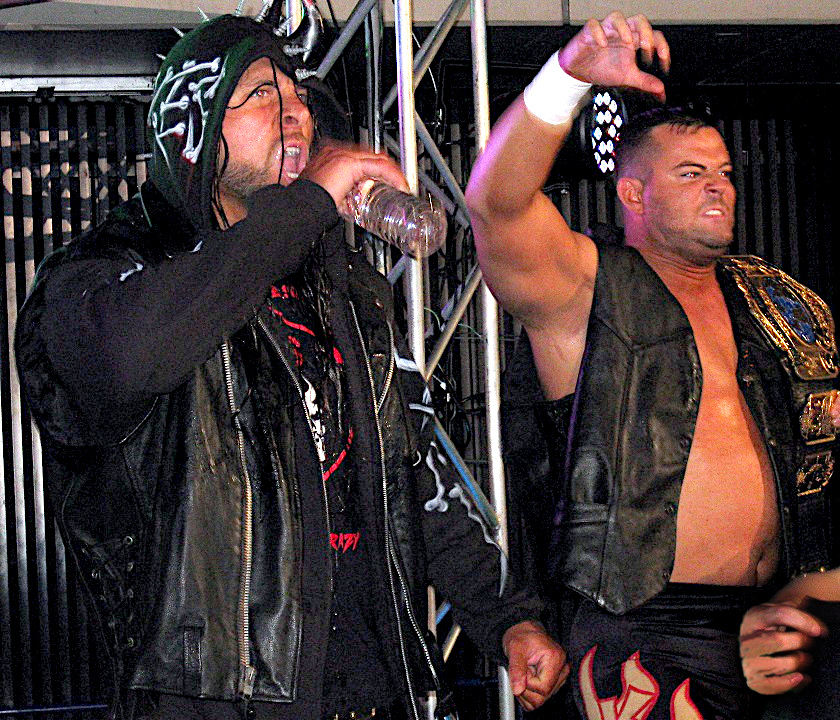
Smith (right) and Lance Archer - the Killer Elite Squad - are two-time NWA World Tag Team Champions...

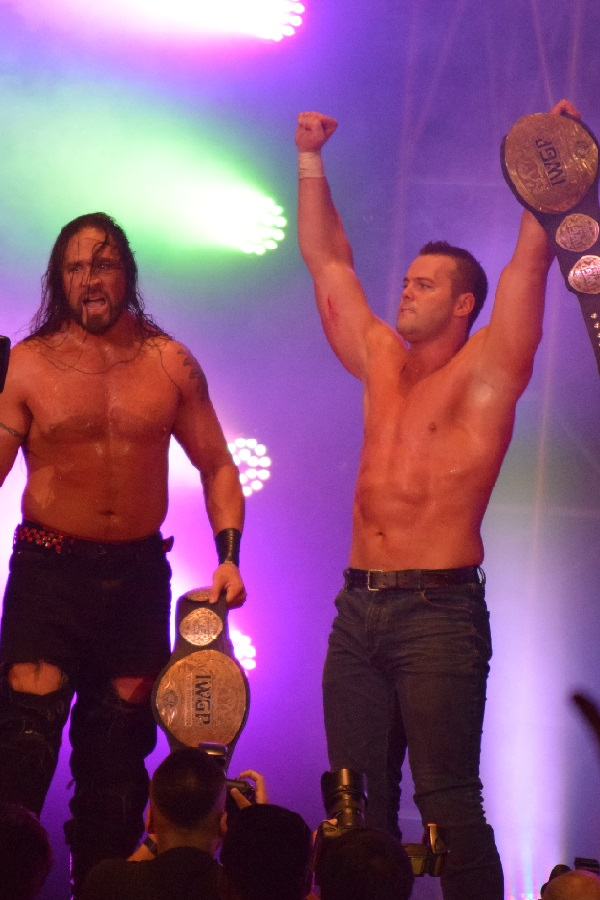
...and three-time IWGP Tag Team Champions.

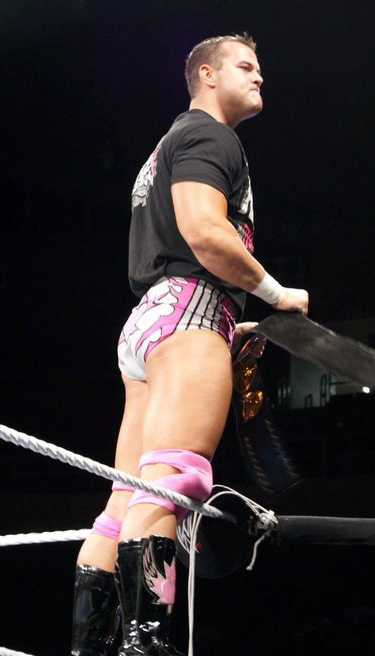
In WWE teaming with Tyson Kidd, Smith won two Tag Team Championships (shown here with the WWE Tag Team Championship, which he held once).

=== Professional wrestling ===
- All Japan Pro Wrestling
  - Triple Crown Heavyweight Championship (1 time)
- All Star Wrestling
  - ASW Heavyweight Championship (1 time)
- All-Star Wrestling (British Columbia)
  - ASW Trans-Canada Championship (1 time)
- AWA Pinnacle Wrestling
  - AWA Pinnacle Heavyweight Championship (1 time)
- Big Time Wrestling (Newark, CA)
  - BTW Heavyweight Championship (1 time)
- Canadian Wrestling's Elite
  - CWE Central Canadian Heavyweight Championship (1 time)
  - CWE Tag Team Championship (1 time, current) – with Robby Royce
- Canadian Wrestling Hall of Fame
  - Individually
  - With the Hart family
- Florida Championship Wrestling
  - FCW Southern Heavyweight Championship (1 time)
  - FCW Florida Tag Team Championship (1 time) – with TJ Wilson
- Hart Legacy Wrestling
  - Stu Hart Heritage Championship (2 times, current )
  - Stu Hart Memorial Cup (2016)
- Great North Wrestling
  - GNW World Television Championship (1 time)
- Major League Wrestling
  - MLW World Tag Team Championship (2 times) – with Brian Pillman Jr. and Teddy Hart (1) and Tom Lawlor (1)
  - GTC Carnival (2004) – with TJ Wilson
  - Opera Cup (2019, 2023)
- National Wrestling Alliance
  - NWA World Tag Team Championship (3 times) – with Lance Archer (2) and Doug Williams (1)
- New Japan Pro-Wrestling
  - IWGP Tag Team Championship (3 times) – with Lance Archer
- New Breed Wrestling Association
  - NBWA Heavyweight Championship (1 time)
- Next Generation Wrestling
  - NGW Heavyweight Championship (1 time)
- Prairie Wrestling Alliance
  - PWA Championship (1 time)
  - PWA Tag Team Championship (1 time) – with TJ Wilson
- Pro Wrestling Illustrated
  - Ranked No. 69 of the top 500 singles wrestlers in the PWI 500 in 2010
- Pro Wrestling Noah
  - GHC Tag Team Championship (2 times) – with Lance Archer
- Real Canadian Wrestling
  - RCW Canadian Heavyweight Championship (1 time)
- Resistance Pro Wrestling
  - RPW Heavyweight Championship (1 time)
- Ring Ka King
  - RKK Tag Team Championship (1 time) – with Chavo Guerrero Jr.
  - RKK Tag Team Championship Tournament (2011) – with Chavo Guerrero Jr.
- Stampede Wrestling
  - Stampede North American Heavyweight Championship (1 time)
  - Stampede International Tag Team Championship (2 times) – with Apocalypse (1) and Kirk Melnick (1)
- World of Sport Wrestling
  - WOS Tag Team Championship (1 time) – with Grado
- World Wrestling Entertainment/WWE
  - World Tag Team Championship (1 time, final) – with Tyson Kidd
  - WWE Tag Team Championship (1 time) – with Tyson Kidd
  - Bragging Rights Trophy (2009) – with Team SmackDown (Chris Jericho, Kane, Matt Hardy, Finlay, R-Truth, and Tyson Kidd)

=== Submission grappling ===
- North American Grappling Association
  - West Coast (Vegas) Championship: Masters No-Gi Expert Super Heavy Weight Division (2016)

== See also ==
- Hart Dungeon
- The Hart Foundation
- The Hart Dynasty
- Natalya Neidhart
- Tyson Kidd
