= List of MLW tournaments =

Listing of tournaments held by Major League Wrestling

Major League Wrestling (MLW) has held a variety of different professional wrestling tournaments competed for by professional wrestlers that are part of their roster.

== Sporadic tournaments ==
=== MLW World Heavyweight Championship Tournament (2002) ===
The tournament to crown the inaugural MLW World Heavyweight Champion took place at Genesis on June 15, 2002.

=== MLW Global Tag Team Championship Tournament ===
A four-team tournament to determine the inaugural MLW Global Tag Team Championship took place between 2002 and 2003. The semi-final of the tournament took place at the King of Kings event on December 20, 2002 and the tournament finals took place at Revolutions on May 9, 2003.

Semifinals (King of Kings)
PJ Friedman and Steve Williams
Jimmy Yang and Mike Sanders
The Extreme Horsemen (C.W. Anderson and Simon Diamond)
Los Maximos (José Maximo and Joel Maximo)

Final (Revolutions)
PJ Friedman and Steve Williams
The Extreme Horsemen (C.W. Anderson and Simon Diamond)

=== J-Cup USA ===
J-Cup USA was a junior heavyweight single elimination tournament to determine the inaugural MLW World Junior Heavyweight Champion at WarGames on September 19, 2003.

=== GTC Carnival ===
GTC Carnival was a six-team tournament to determine the new #1 contenders for the Global Crown Tag Team Championship. The tournament that took place at MLW's Reloaded event on Night One and Night Two on January 9 and January 10, 2004. The first round took place on January 9 and the second round took place on January 10.

Qualifiers; January 9
Dark Fuego and Pete Wilson
M-Dogg 20 and Roderick Strong
The Havana Pitbulls (Ricky Reyes and Rocky Romero)
Los Maximos (José Maximo and Joel Maximo)
Stampede Bulldogs (Harry Smith and TJ Wilson)
Bobby Quance and Puma
BYE
BYE

Finalists
Dark Fuego and Pete Wilson
The Havana Pitbulls
Stampede Bulldogs
BYE

Final; January 10
Dark Fuego and Pete Wilson The Havana Pitbulls
Stampede Bulldogs

=== MLW National Openweight Championship Tournament ===
The tournament to determine the inaugural holder of the MLW National Openweight Championship took place between April 5, 2019 and June 1, 2019 at the Fury Road special, where the final took place. The semi-final matches aired on Fusion.

== Opera Cup ==
The Opera Cup tournament is a professional wrestling single-elimination tournament held by Major League Wrestling (MLW). First introduced in 2019 at the namesake event, the tournament is a revival of the Professional Wrestling Opera House Cup, which had been last won by Stu Hart in 1948. The tournament was revived by MLW in 2019 and has become an annual recurring tournament.

=== Dates and venues of finals ===
Year	Winner	Times won	Finals date	Runner-up	Venue	Location
2019	Davey Boy Smith Jr.	1	December 5, 2019	Brian Pillman Jr.	Melrose Ballroom	Queens, New York, New York
2020	Tom Lawlor	1	December 23, 2020	Low Ki	GILT Nightclub	Orlando, Florida
2021	Davey Richards	1	November 6, 2021	TJP	2300 Arena	Philadelphia, Pennsylvania
