= WarGames (2018) =

2018 Major League Wrestling supercard event

- Promotion: Major League Wrestling
- Date: September 6, 2018 (aired September 14, 2018)
- City: Fort Lauderdale, Florida
- Venue: War Memorial Auditorium
- Attendance: 1,000-1,500

Event chronology
← Previous; Battle Riot I	Next → Fury Road

WarGames chronology
← Previous; 2003	Next → Final

MLW Fusion special episodes chronology
← Previous; Battle Riot I	Next → Fusion Halloween Special

WarGames (2018) was a professional wrestling supercard event produced by Major League Wrestling (MLW), which took place on September 6, 2018 at the War Memorial Auditorium in Fort Lauderdale, Florida. The event was taped and aired as a special episode of MLW's television program, Fusion, on September 14 on beIN Sports. It was the second and final MLW WarGames event; the event would be succeeded by MLW War Chamber in 2019.

Fifteen matches were contested at the event with one match airing at the WarGames special, the namesake WarGames match, in which Team Strickland (Barrington Hughes, John Hennigan, Kotto Brazil, Shane Strickland and Tommy Dreamer) defeated The Ravagers (Abyss, Jimmy Havoc, Sami Callihan and The Death Machines (Leon Scott and Sawyer Fulton)). Twelve matches were taped for future episodes of Fusion and two non-televised matches took place.

== Production ==
=== Background ===
In July 2017, Major League Wrestling resumed promoting events for the first time since the promotion's original closure in 2004. The success of these events lead MLW to secure a television deal with beIN Sports for a new program, MLW Fusion, which debuted on April 20, 2018.

On June 20, MLW.com announced that it would be holding an event titled Fury Road on September 6. However, on July 10, MLW owner Court Bauer tweeted that he would bring back the WarGames match on September 6 at the War Memorial Auditorium in Fort Lauderdale, Florida, the same venue where MLW had previously held the WarGames match in 2003. Fury Road was postponed to take place on October 4, while WarGames was finalized as the September 6 event.

=== Storylines ===
The card consisted of matches that resulted from scripted storylines, where wrestlers portrayed villains, heroes, or less distinguishable characters in scripted events that built tension and culminated in a wrestling match or series of matches, with results predetermined by MLW's writers. Storylines were played out on MLW's television program Fusion.

On the June 22 episode of Fusion, Barrington Hughes ensured that the World Heavyweight Champion Shane Strickland would not get attacked by Sami Callihan and his Death Machines (Leon Scott and Sawyer Fulton). This led to Hughes being attacked by the Death Machines. On the July 13 episode of Fusion, Shane Strickland was mysteriously attacked, which led to him losing the World Heavyweight Championship to Low Ki. The attacker was revealed to be Strickland's former ally Sami Callihan, who said that he perpetrated the attack due to greed of money being paid to him by Ki and Salina de la Renta. Callihan would go on to defeat Strickland on the August 3 episode of Fusion. On August 7, it was announced that Strickland and Callihan would be captains for opposing teams in the WarGames match at WarGames, with Strickland's team consisting of John Hennigan, Tommy Dreamer, Barrington Hughes and Kotto Brazil and Callihan's team called the Ravagers, which would be consisting of Jimmy Havoc and the Death Machines. On August 20, Abyss was revealed as the fifth member of Ravagers.

== Event ==
The event featured the namesake WarGames match, in which Barrington Hughes, John Hennigan, Kotto Brazil, Shane Strickland and Tommy Dreamer took on The Ravagers (Abyss, Jimmy Havoc, Sami Callihan and The Death Machines (Leon Scott and Sawyer Fulton)). Near the end of the match, Havoc was about to nail an Acid Rainmaker to Dreamer but Dreamer tossed him into Callihan. An enraged Callihan hit a cutter on Havoc. Brazil then wrapped barbed wire on Hughes, who hit a big splash on Fulton and then Brazil and Hughes wrapped the barbed wire around Fulton's head, forcing him to tap out. After the match, the entire losing team attacked Havoc blaming him for the loss.

== Aftermath ==
Sami Callihan and Jimmy Havoc's brawling led to both men demanding several stipulations for a match against each other, which led MLW management to make a Spin the Wheel, Make the Deal match between the two at Fury Road.

Shane Strickland moved on to a feud with Tom Lawlor, which led to the two competing in a match to determine the ace of MLW at Fury Road.

== Results ==
No.	Results	Stipulations
1^{FT}	Ricky Martinez (with Salina de la Renta) defeated Jake St. Patrick	Singles match
2^{FT}	The Hart Foundation (Brian Pillman Jr., Davey Boy Smith Jr. and Teddy Hart) defeated The Stud Stable (Leo Brien, Michael Patrick and Parrow) (with Col. Robert Parker)	Six-man hurricane tag team match
3^{FT}	Jimmy Yuta defeated El Hijo de L.A. Park (with Salina de la Renta)	Singles match
4^{FT}	Jason Cade (with Rhett Giddins) defeated Myron Reed	Singles match
5^{FT}	Brody King versus PCO ended in a double disqualification	Singles match
6^{FT}	Aria Blake and Maxwell Jacob Friedman defeated Joey Ryan and Taya Valkyrie	Mixed tag team match
7^{FT}	Brian Pillman Jr. (with Davey Boy Smith Jr. and Teddy Hart) defeated Vandal Ortagun	Singles match
8^{FT}	LA Park defeated Pentagon Jr.	Mexican Massacre
9^{FT}	Simon Gotch (with Tom Lawlor) defeated Gangrel via disqualification	Singles match Simon Gotch Prize Fight Challenge
10^{FT}	Davey Boy Smith Jr. defeated A. C. H.	Singles match
11^{D}	Tom Lawlor defeated Joey Janela via disqualification	Singles match
12^{FT}	Teddy Hart (with Brian Pillman Jr. and Davey Boy Smith Jr.) defeated Rich Swann	Singles match
13^{D}	James Storm defeated Alan Ocean	Singles match
14^{FT}	Low Ki (with Salina de la Renta) (c) defeated Rey Fenix	Singles match for the MLW World Heavyweight Championship
15	Team Strickland (Barrington Hughes, John Hennigan, Kotto Brazil, Shane Strickland and Tommy Dreamer) defeated The Ravagers (Abyss, Jimmy Havoc, Sami Callihan and The Death Machines (Leon Scott and Sawyer Fulton))	WarGames match
(c) / – the champion(s) heading into the match; FT / – the match was taped for a future broadcast of Fusion; D / – this was a dark match
