= MLW Reload =

Reload
- Promotion: Major League Wrestling
- Date: September 26, 2002
- City: New York City, New York
- Venue: Manhattan Center
- Attendance: 500-600

Event chronology
← Previous; Genesis	Next → King of Kings

MLW Reload was a professional wrestling supercard event produced by Major League Wrestling (MLW), which took place on September 26, 2002, at the Manhattan Center in New York, New York.

Nine professional wrestling matches were taped at the event, with seven matches being featured on the Reload home video release and one match aired on Underground. The vacant MLW World Heavyweight Championship was decided in the main event between a match between Jerry Lynn and Satoshi Kojima, which Kojima won. Other prominent matches on the card featured Taiyo Kea defeating Sabu to become the #1 contender for the World Heavyweight Championship, Steve Corino defeating The Sandman and Vampiro in a Three-Way Street Fight and Terry Funk defeating Chris Candido.

The event's name was later used in 2024 for a TV special featuring matches taped at the Kings of Colosseum event, which was held on January 6 of that year.

== Event ==
The event kicked off with Joey Styles making an announcement that the MLW World Heavyweight Championship would be decided in the main event between Jerry Lynn and Satoshi Kojima while their next #1 contender would be determined in a match between Taiyo Kea and Sabu later in the night.

=== Preliminary matches ===
The opening match took place between Super Crazy and Fuego Guerrero. Crazy avoided a high-angle senton bomb by Guerrero and countered a hurricanrana by Guerrero into a spinning powerbomb for the win.

Next, PJ Friedman and Steve Williams took on Afterburn and Eric Adams in a tag team match. Friedman delivered a German suplex to Afterburn and Williams hit a backdrop driver to Adams for the win.

Next, La Parka took on Shocker. Parka hit Shocker in the groin while Shocker attempted to hit a bronco buster to Parka and Parka then grabbed Shocker by the hair and dropped him on the mat and hit a corkscrew moonsault on Shocker for the win.

Next, Christopher Daniels, Dick Togo and Ikuto Hidaka took on Quiet Storm and The S.A.T. (Joel Maximo and Jose Maximo) in a six-man tag team match. Daniels nailed a Last Rites to Storm for the win.

Next, Terry Funk took on Chris Candido. Candido countered a spinning toe hold by Funk by attempting to pin him with a roll-up but Funk rolled over for the win. Candido attacked Funk after the match by executing a piledriver.

Later, a street fight was scheduled to take place between Vampiro and Steve Corino. The Sandman interrupted the two and challenged them to a match, making it a three-way elimination. Sandman superplexed Corino off the top onto the guardrail and Vampiro pinned Sandman to eliminate him. Corino then nailed an Old School Expulsion from the middle rope to Vampiro for the win.

It was followed by the penultimate match of the event between Sabu and Taiyo Kea to determine the #1 contender for the World Heavyweight Championship. Kea nailed a Hawaiian Smasher to a diving Sabu in mid-air for a near-fall and delivered a second Hawaiian Smasher and a H5O for the win.

=== Main event match ===
The main event took place between Jerry Lynn and Satoshi Kojima, with the vacant World Heavyweight Championship on the line. Kojima nailed a back drop to Lynn and a sitout scoop slam piledriver and followed it with a lariat to win the title.

== Aftermath ==
MLW officially recognized Satoshi Kojima as their inaugural World Heavyweight Champion, thus refusing to acknowledge Shane Douglas' title win at Genesis, considering it a different belt and a different lineage. Taiyo Kea was supposed to challenge Kojima for the title at King of Kings but he suffered a knee injury which forced him to withdraw from the match and he was subsequently replaced by Vampiro as Kojima's opponent.

Although not included in the Reload home video release, the tag team match of PJ Friedman and Steve Williams would later air on the April 14, 2003 airing of MLW's television program Underground TV. Friedman and Williams would form a tag team, entering a tournament for the new Global Tag Team Championship at King of Kings.

== Results ==
No.	Results	Stipulations	Times
1	Super Crazy defeated Fuego Guerrero	Singles match	10:24
2	PJ Friedman and Steve Williams (with Joel Gertner) defeated Afterburn and Eric Adams	Tag team match (Underground TV – April 14)	—
3	La Parka defeated Shocker	Singles match	13:46
4	Christopher Daniels, Dick Togo and Ikuto Hidaka defeated Quiet Storm and Los Maximos (Joel and Jose)	Six-man tag team match	22:52
5^{D}	CW Anderson defeated Devon Storm	Singles match	—
6	Terry Funk defeated Chris Candido (with Sunny)	Singles match	17:06
7	Steve Corino defeated The Sandman and Vampiro	Three-Way Street Fight	17:02
8	Taiyo Kea defeated Sabu	Singles match to determine the #1 contender for the MLW World Heavyweight Championship	15:34
9	Satoshi Kojima defeated Jerry Lynn	Singles match for the vacant MLW World Heavyweight Championship	13:14
D / – this was a dark match
