= MLW Genesis =

2002 supercard event by Major League Wrestling

Genesis
- Promotion: Major League Wrestling
- Date: June 15, 2002
- City: Philadelphia, Pennsylvania
- Venue: Viking Hall
- Attendance: 400-600

Event chronology
← Previous; First	Next → Reload

Genesis was a professional wrestling supercard event produced by Major League Wrestling (MLW), which took place on June 15, 2002 at the Viking Hall in Philadelphia, Pennsylvania. It was the inaugural event by MLW and featured an eight-man single elimination tournament to crown the inaugural World Heavyweight Champion.

Nine professional wrestling matches were taped at the event with seven matches of the World Heavyweight Championship tournament being televised. The tournament concluded with Shane Douglas defeating Taiyo Kea and Vampiro in a three-way match in the finals of the tournament to win the title.

== Event ==
=== Quarterfinals ===
Other on-screen personnel
Role:	Name:
Commentator	Joey Styles
Referees	John Finnegan
Referees	Mike Keiner

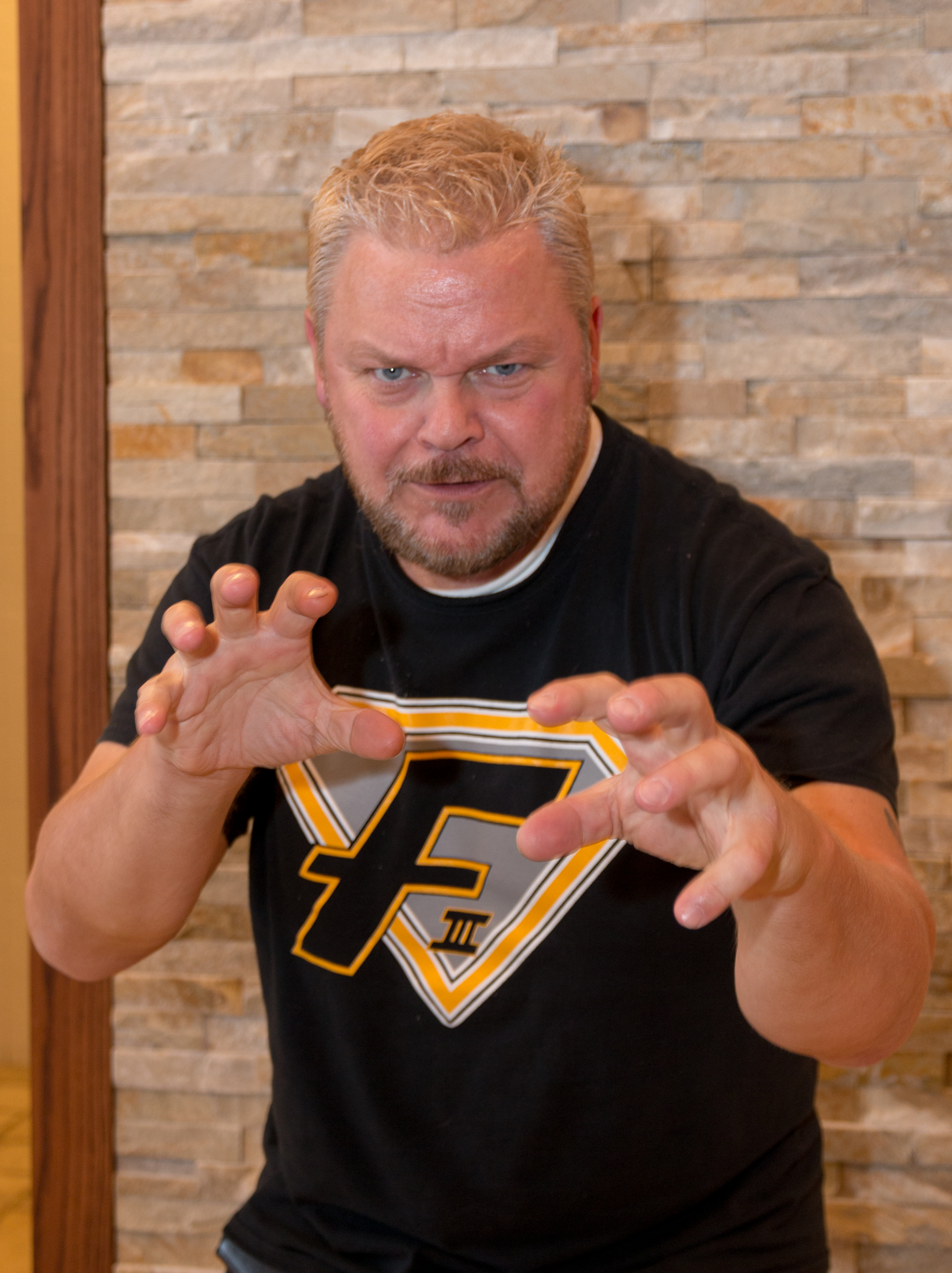
Shane Douglas won the eight-man tournament at Genesis to become the inaugural MLW World Heavyweight Champion.

The event featured a tournament to crown the new MLW World Heavyweight Champion. The opening match of the tournament took place between Jerry Lynn and La Parka. After avoiding a corkscrew moonsault by Parka, Lynn executed a tornado DDT off the ropes for the win.

In the next match, Vampiro took on Christopher Daniels. After avoiding a lariat by Daniels, Vampiro hit a lifting side slam to Daniels for the win.

Next, Taiyo Kea was scheduled to take on Bam Bam Bigelow but Bigelow did not show up and was subsequently replaced by The Wall. Kea countered a powerbomb by Wall into a hurricanrana and executed a bridging Northern Lights suplex on Wall for the win.

It was followed by the last quarterfinal match between Shane Douglas and Steve Corino. Corino attempted to deliver an Old School Expulsion to Douglas but Douglas reversed it into a belly to belly suplex for the win.

=== Semifinals ===
The first semifinal match in the tournament took place between Jerry Lynn and Shane Douglas. Douglas countered a cradle piledriver by Lynn and nailed a Pittsburgh Plunge to Lynn for the win.

The second semifinal took place between Taiyo Kea and Vampiro. Near the end of the match, Kea nailed a Hawaiian Smasher to Vampiro but the 17-minute time limit expired and the match ended in a time limit draw. Vampiro demanded five more minutes but Shane Douglas showed up to begin a three-way dance against both Vampiro and Kea.

=== Final ===
The tournament final three-way dance took place between Shane Douglas, Taiyo Kea and Vampiro. Kea and Vampiro quickly took down Douglas and then Vampiro attempted to hit a spin kick to Douglas but Douglas countered it and Vampiro accidentally hit Kea which allowed Douglas to hit a belly to belly suplex to Vampiro to win the World Heavyweight Championship. Douglas then insulted the MLW title belt by spitting on it and throwing it down in a repetition of him throwing down the NWA World Heavyweight Championship on August 27, 1994. Referee John Finnegan threatened to suspend Douglas if he did not defend the title.

== Aftermath ==
In light of Shane Douglas' controversial actions, he was stripped off the World Heavyweight Championship on September 13. A match was set up between Jerry Lynn and Satoshi Kojima to determine a new champion at Reload, which Kojima won. MLW later refused to acknowledge Douglas' reign as champion and officially recognized Kojima as the first-ever MLW World Heavyweight Champion.

== Results ==
No.	Results	Stipulations	Times
1	Jerry Lynn defeated La Parka	MLW World Heavyweight Championship tournament quarter-final match	7:04
2	Vampiro defeated Christopher Daniels	MLW World Heavyweight Championship tournament quarter-final match	13:56
3	Taiyo Kea defeated The Wall	MLW World Heavyweight Championship tournament quarter-final match	6:43
4	Shane Douglas defeated Steve Corino	MLW World Heavyweight Championship tournament quarter-final match	9:40
5^{D}	Prince Nana, Super Hentai and Ultra Taro Jr. defeated Abunai, Devon Storm and Rising Son	Six-man tag team match	26:39
6^{D}	PJ Friedman defeated Shirley Doe	Singles match	—
7	Shane Douglas defeated Jerry Lynn	MLW World Heavyweight Championship tournament semi-final match	7:32
8	Taiyo Kea vs. Vampiro ended in a time limit draw	MLW World Heavyweight Championship tournament semi-final match	17:00
9	Shane Douglas defeated Taiyo Kea and Vampiro	Three-way dance for the MLW World Heavyweight Championship	1:15
D / – this was a dark match

=== Tournament brackets ===
Quarterfinals
Jerry Lynn	Pin
La Parka	7:04
Shane Douglas	Pin
Steve Corino	9:40
Taiyo Kea	Pin
The Wall	6:43
Vampiro	Pin
Christopher Daniels	13:56

Semifinals
Jerry Lynn	Pin
Shane Douglas	7:32
Taiyo Kea	Bye
Vampiro	17:00

Final
Shane Douglas	Pin
Taiyo Kea Vampiro	1:15
