= MLW WarGames =

WarGames
- Promotions: Major League Wrestling
- First event: WarGames (2003)
- Last event: WarGames (2018)
- Signature matches: WarGames match

WarGames was a reoccurring professional wrestling supercard event produced by Major League Wrestling (MLW) named after the WarGames match, which headlined each event.

Both events have been held during September. The inaugural event in 2003 was a supercard, while the other was a television taping for MLW Fusion in 2018. The 2018 WarGames match aired on the September 14, 2018 episode of Fusion on beIN Sports.

The event was replaced by War Chamber in 2019, after WWE acquired the rights from MLW.

== Dates and venues ==
#	Event	Date	City	Venue	Main event
1	WarGames (2003)	September 19, 2003	Fort Lauderdale, Florida	War Memorial Auditorium	The Funkin' Army (Bill Alfonso, Sabu, Steve Williams, Terry Funk and The Sandman) vs. The Extreme Horsemen (Barry Windham, CW Anderson, PJ Walker, Simon Diamond and Steve Corino) in a WarGames match
2	WarGames (2018)	September 6, 2018	Fort Lauderdale, Florida	War Memorial Auditorium	Barrington Hughes, John Hennigan, Kotto Brazil, Shane Strickland and Tommy Dreamer vs. Abyss, Jimmy Havoc, Sami Callihan and The Death Machines (Leon Scott and Sawyer Fulton) in a WarGames match
