= WarGames (2003) =

2003 Major League Wrestling supercard event

- Promotion: Major League Wrestling
- Date: September 19, 2003
- City: Fort Lauderdale, Florida
- Venue: War Memorial Auditorium
- Attendance: 1,074

Event chronology
← Previous; Summer Apocalypse	Next → Reloaded

WarGames chronology
← Previous; First	Next → 2018

WarGames (2003) was a professional wrestling supercard event produced by Major League Wrestling (MLW), which took place on September 19, 2003, at the War Memorial Auditorium in Fort Lauderdale, Florida. The event was a television taping for MLW Underground TV. It was the first MLW WarGames event.

Fourteen matches were contested at the event. The main event was the namesake WarGames match, in which The Funkin' Army (Bill Alfonso, Sabu, Steve Williams, Terry Funk and The Sandman) defeated The Extreme Horsemen (Barry Windham, CW Anderson, PJ Walker, Simon Diamond and Steve Corino). Aside from the WarGames match, the event also featured an eight-man J-Cup USA Tournament to crown the inaugural World Junior Heavyweight Champion.

== Event ==
=== Preliminary matches ===
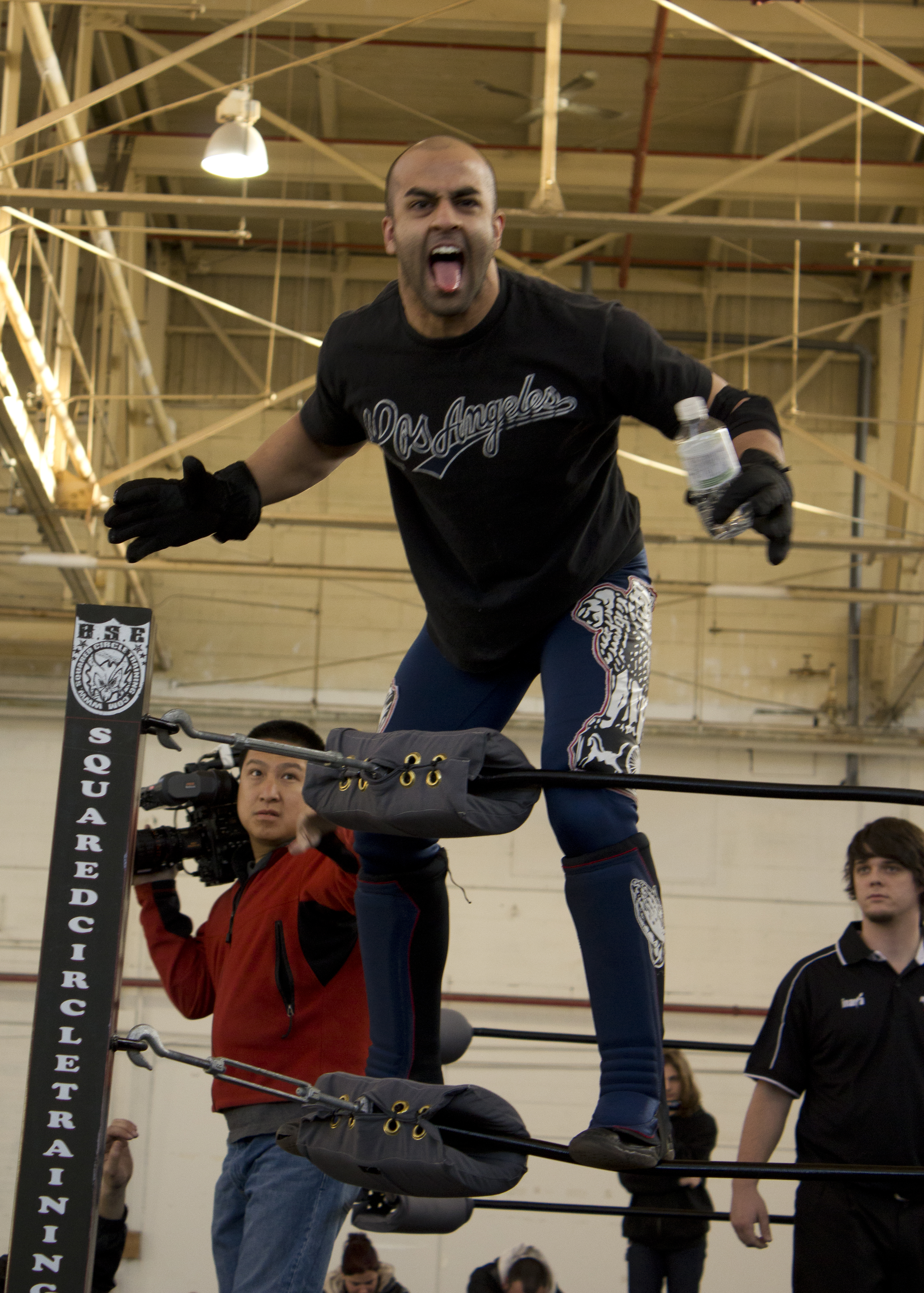
Sonjay Dutt won the J-Cup USA tournament to become the inaugural MLW World Junior Heavyweight Champion.

The event opened with a tag team match pitting Los Maximos (Joel Maximo and Jose Maximo) against the team of Juventud Guerrera and Super Dragon. After a series of roll-up attempts and counters between the two, Jose pinned Dragon for the win.

Next, the first match of the J-Cup USA Tournament took place to crown the inaugural World Junior Heavyweight Champion, in which Sonjay Dutt took on Tony Mamaluke. Dutt nailed a Hindu Press on Mamaluke for the win.

Next, Eddie Colon took on Jerry Lynn in the J-Cup USA tournament. Colon hit a corkscrew diving splash on Lynn for the win.

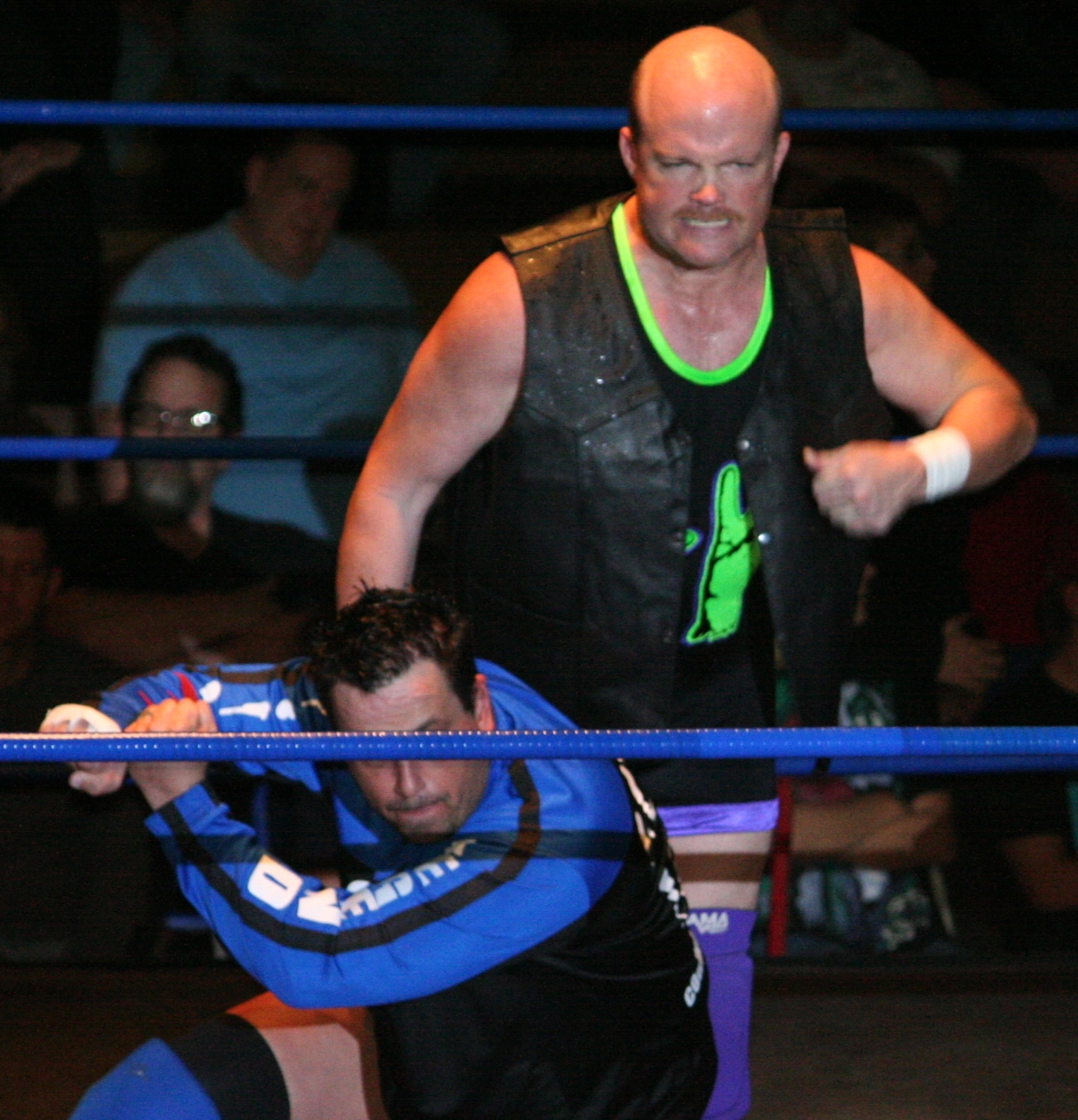
Steve Corino and CW Anderson represented Extreme Horsemen in the main event WarGames match.

Next, Juventud Guerrera took on Jimmy Yang in the third J-Cup USA tournament match. Yang hit a Yang Time on Guerrera for the win.

It was followed by the final match in the J-Cup USA tournament first round where Super Dragon took on Christopher Daniels. Daniels low blowed Dragon and nailed a Last Rites for the win.

Next, Norman Smiley took on Mikey Whipwreck. Whipwreck nailed a Whippersnapper on Smiley from the top rope for the win.

Next, The Samoan Island Tribe (Ekmo, Mana and Samu) took on the team of Matt Rite, Monsta Mack and Richard J. Criado in a Falls Count Anywhere match. Rite was set up on a table in the crowd and Ekmo nailed a diving splash on Rite by diving over the ring post through the table for the win.

Next, Mike Awesome took on Joe Seanoa. Near the end of the match, Awesome hit Joe with a chair and nailed an Awesome Bomb and then placed a chair on top of Joe and nailed an Awesome Splash to Joe for the win.

This was followed by the first semi-final in the J-Cup USA pitting Sonjay Dutt against Eddie Colon. Dutt countered a springboard sunset flip by Colon by hitting a spinebuster and pinned Colon with a roll-up for the win.

The second semi-final of the J-Cup USA pitted Jimmy Yang against Christopher Daniels. Mikey Whipwreck interfered in the match on Daniels' behalf as he crotched Yang on the top rope as Yang attempted to hit a Yang Time, allowing Daniels to hit a Last Rites on Yang for the win.

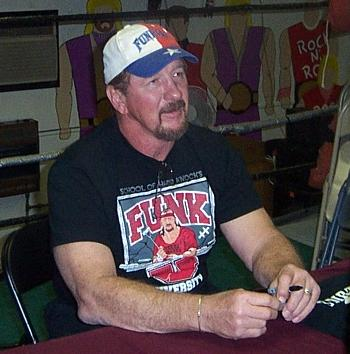
Terry Funk led the Funkin' Army to victory against Extreme Horsemen in the WarGames match in the main event.

Next, Raven took on Nosawa. CM Punk interfered in the match as he held Raven and Nosawa hit a superkick but Raven ducked and Punk was hit instead. The distraction allowed Raven to hit Nosawa with a Raven Effect for the win.

Later, Vampiro took on CM Punk. Vampiro countered a hurricanrana by Punk into a roll-up for the win.

This was followed by the final round match of the J-Cup USA tournament between Sonjay Dutt and Christopher Daniels. Near the end of the match, Mikey Whipwreck interfered in the match to distract the referee. Dutt dived onto Whipwreck to take him out and then nailed a Hindu Press to Daniels to win the tournament and become the inaugural World Junior Heavyweight Champion.

=== Main event match ===
The main event was the WarGames match between The Funkin' Army (Sabu, Steve Williams, Terry Funk and The Sandman) and The Extreme Horsemen (Barry Windham, CW Anderson, PJ Walker, Simon Diamond and Steve Corino). Funkin' Army were outnumbered by Extreme Horsemen with a disadvantage of 4–5, which led to Bill Alfonso joining the match as the fifth member of Funkin' Army. Funk hit Corino with a branding iron and a fireball into Corino's face and made him submit to the spinning toe hold for the win.

== Results ==
No.	Results	Stipulations
1	Los Maximos (Joel Maximo and Jose Maximo) defeated Juventud Guerrera and Super Dragon	Tag team match
2	Sonjay Dutt defeated Tony Mamaluke	Singles match MLW World Junior Heavyweight Championship J-Cup USA tournament quarter-final
3	Eddie Colon defeated Jerry Lynn	Singles match MLW World Junior Heavyweight Championship J-Cup USA tournament quarter-final
4	Jimmy Yang defeated Juventud Guerrera	Singles match MLW World Junior Heavyweight Championship J-Cup USA tournament quarter-final
5	Christopher Daniels defeated Super Dragon	Singles match MLW World Junior Heavyweight Championship J-Cup USA tournament quarter-final
6	Mikey Whipwreck defeated Norman Smiley	Singles match
7	The Samoan Island Tribe (Ekmo, Mana and Samu) defeated Matt Rite, Monsta Mack and Richard J. Criado	Falls Count Anywhere match
8	Mike Awesome defeated Joe Seanoa	Singles match
9	Sonjay Dutt defeated Eddie Colon	Singles match MLW World Junior Heavyweight Championship J-Cup USA tournament semi-final
10	Christopher Daniels defeated Jimmy Yang	Singles match MLW World Junior Heavyweight Championship J-Cup USA tournament semi-final
11	Raven defeated Nosawa	Singles match
12	Vampiro defeated CM Punk	Singles match
13	Sonjay Dutt defeated Christopher Daniels	Singles match MLW World Junior Heavyweight Championship J-Cup USA tournament final
14	The Funkin' Army (Bill Alfonso, Sabu, Steve Williams, Terry Funk and The Sandman) defeated The Extreme Horsemen (Barry Windham, CW Anderson, PJ Walker, Simon Diamond and Steve Corino)	WarGames match

=== J-Cup USA tournament brackets ===
Quarterfinals
Sonjay Dutt
Tony Mamaluke
Eddie Colón
Jerry Lynn
Jimmy Yang
Juventud Guerrera
Christopher Daniels
Super Dragon

Semifinals
Sonjay Dutt
Eddie Colón
Jimmy Yang
Christopher Daniels

Final
Sonjay Dutt
Christopher Daniels
