= MLW King of Kings =

Professional wrestling event in 2002

King of Kings
- Promotion: Major League Wrestling
- Date: December 20, 2002
- City: Fort Lauderdale, Florida
- Venue: War Memorial Auditorium
- Attendance: 350

Event chronology
| ← Previous; Reload | Next → Revolutions |

King of Kings was a professional wrestling supercard event produced by Major League Wrestling (MLW), which took place on December 20, 2002 at the War Memorial Auditorium in Fort Lauderdale, Florida.

Nine professional wrestling matches were contested at the event. In the main event, Satoshi Kojima retained the MLW World Heavyweight Championship against Vampiro. In other prominent matches on the card, Sabu defeated La Parka and Mike Awesome defeated Jerry Lynn and the Global Tag Team Championship was introduced as the semi-final round of the tournament for the tag team titles took place at the event.

== Results ==
| No. | Results | Stipulations | Times |
|---|---|---|---|
| 1^{D} | Hack Meyers vs. Norman Smiley ended in a no contest | Singles match | — |
| 2 | E. Z. Money and Julio Dinero defeated Masada and Nosawa | Tag team match | 9:22 |
| 3 | Fuego Guerrero defeated Christopher Daniels and Super Crazy | Three Way Dance | 14:47 |
| 4 | PJ Friedman and Steve Williams defeated Jimmy Yang and Mike Sanders | Tag team match MLW Global Tag Team Championship tournament semi-final match | 9:57 |
| 5 | CW Anderson and Simon Diamond defeated Los Maximos (Joel and Jose) | Tag team match MLW Global Tag Team Championship tournament semi-final match | 13:05 |
| 6 | Sabu (with Bill Alfonso) defeated La Parka | Singles match | 19:37 |
| 7 | Mike Awesome defeated Jerry Lynn | Singles match to determine the #1 contender for the MLW World Heavyweight Championship | 8:20 |
| 8 | Steve Corino defeated Dusty Rhodes and Terry Funk | Three Way Dance | 9:30 |
| 9 | Satoshi Kojima (c) defeated Vampiro | Singles match for the MLW World Heavyweight Championship | 18:04 |
(c) / – the champion(s) heading into the match; D / – this was a dark match

=== Tournament brackets ===
Semifinals (King of Kings)
PJ Friedman and Steve Williams
Jimmy Yang and Mike Sanders
The Extreme Horsemen (C.W. Anderson and Simon Diamond)
Los Maximos (José Maximo and Joel Maximo)

Final (Revolutions)
PJ Friedman and Steve Williams
The Extreme Horsemen (C.W. Anderson and Simon Diamond)
