= WarGames match =

Professional wrestling match type

WarGames is a specialized steel cage match in professional wrestling. The match usually involves two teams of four or more wrestlers locked inside a steel cage that encompasses two rings placed side by side. The cage may or may not have a roof, depending on which professional wrestling promotion the match is held in.

Created by Dusty Rhodes in 1987, the WarGames match was originally used in Jim Crockett Promotions (JCP) of the National Wrestling Alliance, and later, held annually in World Championship Wrestling (WCW), usually at the Fall Brawl pay-per-view event. These original WarGames matches had a roof on the cage with no pinfalls as a win situation, although later WCW versions allowed pinfalls to win.

Since 2017, WWE, which purchased the assets of WCW in 2001, has held annual WarGames matches at WarGames branded events, first at NXT WarGames from 2017 to 2021 and currently at Survivor Series (branded as Survivor Series: WarGames) since 2022. WWE's WarGames matches do not have a roof on the cage and also allow pinfalls as a win situation.

Over the years, other promotions have held their own versions of WarGames matches under different names: All Elite Wrestling (AEW) established its own version called "Blood and Guts" for an eponymous annual special in 2021, which is based largely on the original JCP/WCW rules.

== History ==
The WarGames match was created when Dusty Rhodes was inspired by a viewing of Mad Max Beyond Thunderdome. It was originally used as a specialty match for the Four Horsemen. The first WarGames match took place at The Omni in Atlanta, Georgia during National Wrestling Alliance (NWA) member Jim Crockett Promotions' (JCP) Great American Bash '87 tour, where it was known as War Games: The Match Beyond. It would be held at three house shows later that year, once at the Miami Orange Bowl, once in Chicago at the UIC Pavilion, and the other at the NWA's debut at the Nassau Coliseum on Long Island. In 1988, JCP was sold to Turner Broadcasting and rebranded as World Championship Wrestling (WCW), although with WCW still under the NWA. That year, WarGames would be held during the Great American Bash Tour in 1988 at 11 house shows (one was released on the WWE Horsemen DVD). The final War Games matches under the NWA/WCW banner were at The Great American Bash in 1989 and a house show rematch at The Omni in Atlanta. WCW, no longer under the NWA, then first used the match in 1991 at WrestleWar and at five house shows during the 1991 Great American Bash tour and in 1992 at WrestleWar, before it became a traditional Fall Brawl event from 1993 to 1998.

After the World Wrestling Federation (WWF, renamed to WWE in 2002) purchased WCW in 2001, it discontinued the concept until 2017, when the promotion revived the match to be held for their developmental brand NXT at an event titled NXT TakeOver: WarGames. This would become an annual NXT TakeOver event for WWE until 2021. That year, the TakeOver series was discontinued, but a WarGames event was still held for NXT in December. The following year, WWE rebranded its annual Survivor Series pay-per-view for the main roster brands, Raw and SmackDown, as Survivor Series: WarGames, marking WWE's first main roster event to feature the match.

=== Format ===
The WarGames match consists of two or three teams, with between three and six participants facing off with each other in staggered entry format.

The setup of the cage consists of two rings side by side with a ring-encompassing rectangular cage that covered both rings, but not the ringside area. Doors are placed at far corners of the cage, near where the opposing teams wait to enter, so the teams do not contact each other before they enter the match. Exceptions to this format were in the match held at Fall Brawl 1996, where tension between Team WCW and the New World Order led to the teams staying backstage and making their entrances from there, and again for both the men and women's matches held at Survivor Series 2025, where participants were held backstage and released in surprise order.

The match begins with one member of each team entering the cage. After five minutes, a member from one of the teams (usually determined by a coin toss, but, in the 2025 AEW version, determined by a best-of-three singles matches by members of each team the previous week; traditionally, the "heel" team gets the advantage in order to provide heat. Before 2025 Survivor Series: WarGames, the team advantage is determined by preliminary matches) enters the cage, giving his team the temporary 2-on-1 handicap advantage. After the next two or three minutes, a member from the other team enters to even the odds. Entrants alternate between teams every two or three minutes, giving the team with the advantage the temporary advantage in terms of numbers, before giving the other team the advantage with the freshest man and even odds.

Teams continue to alternate during the remaining periods until all participants are in the ring. Once all participants enter the cage, what is referred to as "The Match Beyond" begins. Both teams wrestle each other in the cage until any participant either submits, surrenders, or is knocked unconscious. There originally were no pinfalls, no count-outs, and no disqualifications. However, later WCW versions, along with WWE and Major League Wrestling, allow pinfalls.

In WWE and Major League Wrestling's variations, the cage is roofless. In WWE's variation, however, if one member of a team escapes the cage, their whole team is disqualified. In a 2022 interview with The Ringer, Triple H explained the removal of the cage's roof:

When we first started redoing [the match], people were upset that we didn't have a top on the cage. And I was like, "Well, we already have one with the top on Hell in a Cell." And the other thing is, it used to drive me nuts when I was a kid that the cage was too short. You'd see like what happened with Brian Pillman, where he got put up for a powerbomb and it wasn't enough space. [Taking the top off the cage] allows you to do so much more stuff. Look, in the old generation, no one was about to jump off the top of that cage. The times have changed, the business has evolved, and the cage that WarGames is held in needed to evolve, too.

On the October 31, 2019, episode of WWE NXT, the first-ever women's WarGames match was announced for that year's NXT TakeOver: WarGames event. Women Superstars Uncensored and Pro-Wrestling: EVE have previously held variations of the WarGames match, but this would be the first official match to follow the WarGames format.

== WWE/NWA/WCW matches ==
NXT-branded event
NWA-branded event
WCW-branded event
Raw/SmackDown-branded event

#	Match	Event	Venue	Location	Date
1	Road Warriors (Road Warrior Hawk and Road Warrior Animal), Nikita Koloff, Dusty Rhodes, and Paul Ellering vs. The Four Horsemen (Ric Flair, Arn Anderson, Lex Luger, Tully Blanchard, and J. J. Dillon)	The Great American Bash Tour 1987	Omni Coliseum	Atlanta, Georgia	July 4, 1987
2	Road Warriors (Road Warrior Hawk and Road Warrior Animal), Nikita Koloff, Dusty Rhodes, and Paul Ellering vs. The Four Horsemen (Ric Flair, Arn Anderson, Lex Luger, and Tully Blanchard), and The War Machine	The Great American Bash Tour 1987	Miami Orange Bowl	Miami, Florida	July 31, 1987
3	Road Warriors (Road Warrior Hawk and Road Warrior Animal), Ron Garvin, Dusty Rhodes, and Nikita Koloff vs. The Four Horsemen (Ric Flair, Arn Anderson, Lex Luger, Tully Blanchard, and J. J. Dillon)	House show	UIC Pavilion	Chicago, Illinois	August 16, 1987
4	Ron Garvin, Dusty Rhodes, Barry Windham, and Rock 'n' Roll Express (Ricky Morton and Robert Gibson) vs. Midnight Express (Bobby Eaton and Stan Lane), Big Bubba Rogers, Arn Anderson, and Tully Blanchard	House show	Nassau Coliseum	Uniondale, New York	November 25, 1987
5	Road Warriors (Road Warrior Hawk and Road Warrior Animal), Dusty Rhodes, Lex Luger, and Paul Ellering vs. The Four Horsemen (Ric Flair, Arn Anderson, Tully Blanchard, Barry Windham, and J. J. Dillon)	The Great American Bash Tour 1988	Orange County Convention Center	Orlando, Florida	June 26, 1988
6	Dusty Rhodes, Sting, Lex Luger, Nikita Koloff, and Paul Ellering vs. The Four Horsemen (Ric Flair, Arn Anderson, Tully Blanchard, Barry Windham, and J. J. Dillon)	The Great American Bash Tour 1988	Charlotte Memorial Stadium	Charlotte, North Carolina	July 2, 1988
7	Nikita Koloff, Sting, Lex Luger, and Road Warriors (Road Warrior Hawk and Road Warrior Animal) vs. The Four Horsemen (Ric Flair, Arn Anderson, Tully Blanchard, Barry Windham, and J. J. Dillon)	The Great American Bash Tour 1988	Von Braun Civic Center	Huntsville, Alabama	July 12, 1988
8	Road Warriors (Road Warrior Hawk and Road Warrior Animal), Sting, Lex Luger, and Steve Williams vs. The Four Horsemen (Ric Flair, Arn Anderson, Tully Blanchard, Barry Windham, and J. J. Dillon)	The Great American Bash Tour 1988	UTC Arena	Chattanooga, Tennessee	July 14, 1988
9	Road Warriors (Road Warrior Hawk and Road Warrior Animal), Sting, Lex Luger, and Nikita Koloff vs. The Four Horsemen (Ric Flair, Arn Anderson, Tully Blanchard, Barry Windham, and J. J. Dillon)	The Great American Bash Tour 1988	Richmond Coliseum	Richmond, Virginia	July 15, 1988
10	Dusty Rhodes, Nikita Koloff, Lex Luger, Steve Williams, and Paul Ellering vs. The Four Horsemen (Ric Flair, Arn Anderson, Tully Blanchard, Barry Windham, and J. J. Dillon)	The Great American Bash Tour 1988	World War Memorial Stadium	Greensboro, North Carolina	July 16, 1988
11	Dusty Rhodes, Sting, Lex Luger, and Nikita Koloff vs. The Four Horsemen (Ric Flair, Arn Anderson, Tully Blanchard, Barry Windham, and J. J. Dillon)	The Great American Bash Tour 1988	Cincinnati Gardens	Cincinnati, Ohio	July 21, 1988
12	Dusty Rhodes, Road Warriors (Road Warrior Hawk and Road Warrior Animal), Lex Luger, and Nikita Koloff defeated The Four Horsemen (Ric Flair, Arn Anderson, Tully Blanchard, Barry Windham, and J. J. Dillon)	The Great American Bash Tour 1988	Philadelphia Civic Center	Philadelphia, Pennsylvania	July 23, 1988
13	The Fantastics (Bobby Fulton & Tommy Rogers) vs. Jim Cornette and The Midnight Express (Bobby Eaton and Stan Lane) in a Three on Two Handicap Bunkhouse Match	The Great American Bash Tour 1988	Roanoke Civic Center	Roanoke, Virginia	July 24, 1988
14	Dusty Rhodes, Road Warriors (Road Warrior Hawk and Road Warrior Animal), Sting, and Nikita Koloff vs. The Four Horsemen (Ric Flair, Arn Anderson, Tully Blanchard, Barry Windham, and J. J. Dillon)	The Great American Bash Tour 1988	Ocean Center	Daytona Beach, Florida	July 28, 1988
15	Dusty Rhodes, Road Warriors (Road Warrior Hawk and Road Warrior Animal), Lex Luger, and Paul Ellering defeated The Four Horsemen (Ric Flair, Arn Anderson, Tully Blanchard, Barry Windham, and J. J. Dillon)	The Great American Bash Tour 1988	Kaiser Convention Center	Oakland, California	August 6, 1988
16	Road Warriors (Road Warrior Hawk and Road Warrior Animal), The Midnight Express (Bobby Eaton and Stan Lane), and Steve Williams vs. Fabulous Freebirds (Jimmy Garvin, Michael Hayes, and Terry Gordy) and Samoan SWAT Team (Fatu and Samu)	The Great American Bash 1989	Baltimore Arena	Baltimore, Maryland	July 23, 1989
17	Road Warriors (Road Warrior Hawk and Road Warrior Animal), The Midnight Express (Bobby Eaton and Stan Lane), and Steve Williams vs. Fabulous Freebirds (Jimmy Garvin, Michael Hayes, and Terry Gordy) and Samoan SWAT Team (Fatu and Samu)	The Great American Bash Tour 1989	Omni Coliseum	Atlanta, Georgia	August 6, 1989
18	The Four Horsemen (Ric Flair, Barry Windham, Sid Vicious, and Larry Zbyszko) vs. Sting, Brian Pillman, and Steiner Brothers (Rick Steiner and Scott Steiner)	WrestleWar '91	Arizona Veterans Memorial Coliseum	Phoenix, Arizona	February 24, 1991
19	Sting, Lex Luger, The Yellow Dog, and El Gigante vs. Barry Windham, Nikita Koloff, Kevin Sullivan, and One Man Gang	The Great American Bash Tour 1991	Brendan Byrne Arena	East Rutherford, New Jersey	July 3, 1991
20	Sting, Lex Luger, The Yellow Dog, and El Gigante vs. Barry Windham, Nikita Koloff, Kevin Sullivan, and One Man Gang	The Great American Bash Tour 1991	Norfolk Scope	Norfolk, Virginia	July 6, 1991
21	Sting, Lex Luger, The Yellow Dog, and El Gigante vs. Barry Windham, Nikita Koloff, Kevin Sullivan, and One Man Gang	The Great American Bash Tour 1991	Richmond Coliseum	Richmond, Virginia	July 7, 1991
22	Sting, Ron Simmons, Tom Zenk, and Robert Gibson vs. Nikita Koloff, One Man Gang, The Diamond Studd, and Richard Morton	Great American Bash Tour 1991	Greensboro Coliseum	Greensboro, North Carolina	August 10, 1991
24	Sting's Squadron (Sting, Nikita Koloff, Dustin Rhodes, Ricky Steamboat, and Barry Windham) vs. Dangerous Alliance (Arn Anderson, Bobby Eaton, Steve Austin, Larry Zbyszko, and Rick Rude)	WrestleWar '92	Jacksonville Memorial Coliseum	Jacksonville, Florida	May 17, 1992
25	Sting, Davey Boy Smith, Dustin Rhodes, and The Shockmaster vs. Sid Vicious, Vader, and Harlem Heat (Kane and Kole)	Fall Brawl '93	Astro Arena	Houston, Texas	September 19, 1993
26	Dusty Rhodes, Dustin Rhodes, and The Nasty Boys (Brian Knobs and Jerry Sags) vs. Terry Funk, Arn Anderson, Bunkhouse Buck, and Robert Parker	Fall Brawl '94	Roanoke Civic Center	Roanoke, Virginia	September 18, 1994
27	The Hulkamaniacs (Hulk Hogan, Randy Savage, Lex Luger, and Sting) vs. The Dungeon of Doom (Kamala the Ugandan Giant, The Zodiac, The Shark, and Meng)	Fall Brawl '95	Asheville Civic Center	Asheville, North Carolina	September 17, 1995
28	The nWo (Hollywood Hogan, Scott Hall, Kevin Nash, and nWo Sting) vs. Lex Luger, Ric Flair, Arn Anderson, and Sting	Fall Brawl '96	Lawrence Joel Veterans Memorial Coliseum	Winston-Salem, North Carolina	September 15, 1996
29	The nWo (Buff Bagwell, Kevin Nash, Syxx, and Konnan) vs. The Four Horsemen (Chris Benoit, Steve McMichael, Ric Flair, and Curt Hennig)	Fall Brawl '97	Lawrence Joel Veterans Memorial Coliseum	Winston-Salem, North Carolina	September 14, 1997
30	Team WCW (Diamond Dallas Page, Roddy Piper, and The Warrior) vs. nWo Hollywood (Hollywood Hogan, Bret Hart, and Stevie Ray) vs. nWo Wolfpac (Kevin Nash, Sting, and Lex Luger)	Fall Brawl 1998	Lawrence Joel Veterans Memorial Coliseum	Winston-Salem, North Carolina	September 13, 1998
31	Kevin Nash (c), Jeff Jarrett, Scott Steiner, and Vince Russo vs. Booker T, Goldberg, KroniK (Brian Adams and Bryan Clark), and Sting for the WCW World Heavyweight Championship	WCW Monday Nitro	Reunion Arena	Dallas, Texas	September 4, 2000
32	The Undisputed Era (Adam Cole, Bobby Fish, and Kyle O'Reilly) vs. Sanity (Alexander Wolfe, Eric Young, and Killian Dain) vs. Authors of Pain (Akam and Rezar) and Roderick Strong	NXT TakeOver: WarGames 2017	Toyota Center	Houston, Texas	November 18, 2017
33	Pete Dunne, Ricochet, and War Raiders (Hanson and Rowe) vs. The Undisputed Era (Adam Cole, Bobby Fish, Kyle O'Reilly, and Roderick Strong)	NXT TakeOver: WarGames 2018	Staples Center	Los Angeles, California	November 17, 2018
34	Team Ripley (Rhea Ripley, Candice LeRae, Tegan Nox, and Dakota Kai) vs. Team Baszler (Shayna Baszler, Io Shirai, Bianca Belair, and Kay Lee Ray)	NXT TakeOver: WarGames 2019	Allstate Arena	Rosemont, Illinois	November 23, 2019
35	Team Ciampa (Tommaso Ciampa, Keith Lee, Dominik Dijakovic, and Kevin Owens) vs. The Undisputed Era (Adam Cole, Bobby Fish, Kyle O'Reilly, and Roderick Strong)	NXT TakeOver: WarGames 2019	Allstate Arena	Rosemont, Illinois	November 23, 2019
36	Team Candice (Candice LeRae, Dakota Kai, Raquel González, and Toni Storm) vs. Team Shotzi (Shotzi Blackheart, Ember Moon, Rhea Ripley, and Io Shirai)	NXT TakeOver: WarGames 2020	WWE Performance Center	Orlando, Florida	December 6, 2020
37	The Undisputed Era (Adam Cole, Kyle O'Reilly, Roderick Strong, and Bobby Fish) vs. Team McAfee (Pat McAfee, Pete Dunne, Danny Burch, and Oney Lorcan)	NXT TakeOver: WarGames 2020	WWE Performance Center	Orlando, Florida	December 6, 2020
38	Io Shirai, Kay Lee Ray, Raquel González, and Cora Jade vs. Toxic Attraction (Mandy Rose, Gigi Dolin, and Jacy Jayne) and Dakota Kai	NXT WarGames	WWE Performance Center	Orlando, Florida	December 5, 2021
39	Team 2.0 (Bron Breakker, Carmelo Hayes, Tony D'Angelo, and Grayson Waller) vs. Team Black & Gold (Tommaso Ciampa, Johnny Gargano, Pete Dunne, and LA Knight)	NXT WarGames	WWE Performance Center	Orlando, Florida	December 5, 2021
40	Bianca Belair, Alexa Bliss, Asuka, Mia Yim, and Becky Lynch vs. Damage CTRL (Bayley, Iyo Sky, and Dakota Kai), Nikki Cross, and Rhea Ripley	Survivor Series: WarGames 2022	TD Garden	Boston, Massachusetts	November 26, 2022
41	The Bloodline (Roman Reigns, Jey Uso, Jimmy Uso, Solo Sikoa, and Sami Zayn) vs. The Brawling Brutes (Sheamus, Butch, and Ridge Holland), Drew McIntyre, and Kevin Owens	Survivor Series: WarGames 2022	TD Garden	Boston, Massachusetts	November 26, 2022
42	Bianca Belair, Charlotte Flair, Shotzi, and Becky Lynch vs. Damage CTRL (Bayley, Asuka, Iyo Sky, and Kairi Sane)	Survivor Series: WarGames 2023	Allstate Arena	Rosemont, Illinois	November 25, 2023
43	Cody Rhodes, Seth "Freakin" Rollins, Jey Uso, Randy Orton, and Sami Zayn vs. The Judgment Day (Damian Priest, Finn Bálor, "Dirty" Dominik Mysterio, and JD McDonagh) and Drew McIntyre	Survivor Series: WarGames 2023	Allstate Arena	Rosemont, Illinois	November 25, 2023
44	Bianca Belair, Bayley, Naomi, Rhea Ripley, and Iyo Sky vs. The Judgment Day (Liv Morgan and Raquel Rodriguez), Nia Jax, Tiffany Stratton, and Candice LeRae	Survivor Series: WarGames 2024	Rogers Arena	Vancouver, British Columbia, Canada	November 30, 2024
45	Roman Reigns, The Usos (Jey Uso and Jimmy Uso), Sami Zayn, and CM Punk vs. The Bloodline (Solo Sikoa, Jacob Fatu, Tama Tonga, and Tonga Loa) and Bronson Reed	Survivor Series: WarGames 2024	Rogers Arena	Vancouver, British Columbia, Canada	November 30, 2024
46	Rhea Ripley, Iyo Sky, Alexa Bliss, Charlotte Flair, and AJ Lee vs. Nia Jax, Lash Legend, The Kabuki Warriors (Asuka and Kairi Sane), and Becky Lynch	Survivor Series: WarGames 2025	Petco Park	San Diego, California	November 29, 2025
47	The Vision (Bron Breakker and Bronson Reed), Logan Paul, Drew McIntyre, and Brock Lesnar vs. CM Punk, Cody Rhodes, The Usos (Jey Uso and Jimmy Uso), and Roman Reigns	Survivor Series: WarGames 2025	Petco Park	San Diego, California	November 29, 2025
48	The Bloodline (Roman Reigns, Jey Uso, Jimmy Uso, Solo Sikoa, and Jacob Fatu) vs. The 946 (Royce Keys, Lucien Price, Bronco Nima, Carmelo Hayes, and Cruz Montana)	Survivor Series: WarGames 2026	Daikin Park	Houston, Texas	November 28, 2026
49	Charlotte Flair, Stephanie Vaquer, Alexa Bliss, Tatum Paxley, and Bayley vs. Fatal Influence (Jacy Jayne, Fallon Henley, and Lainey Reid), Jade Cargill, and Michin	Survivor Series: WarGames 2026	Daikin Park	Houston, Texas	November 28, 2026

=== Participant list ===
WWE

==== Men ====
Wrestler	Victories	Appearances
Jey Uso	3	5
Sami Zayn	3	3
Adam Cole	2	4
Bobby Fish	2	4
Kyle O’Reilly	2	4
Jimmy Uso	2	4
Roman Reigns	2	4
Bron Breakker	2	2
Solo Sikoa	1	3
Bronson Reed	1	2
Carmelo Hayes	1	2
CM Punk	1	2
Cody Rhodes	1	2
Kevin Owens	1	2
Pete Dunne/Butch	1	4
Roderick Strong	1	4
Drew McIntyre	1	3
Tommaso Ciampa	1	2
Brock Lesnar	1	1
Dominik Dijakovic	1	1
Grayson Waller	1	1
Hanson	1	1
Keith Lee	1	1
Logan Paul	1	1
Randy Orton	1	1
Ricochet	1	1
Rowe	1	1
Seth "Freakin" Rollins	1	1
Tony D’Angelo	1	1
Jacob Fatu	0	2
Akam	0	1
Alexander Wolfe	0	1
Bronco Nima	0	1
Cruz Montana	0	1
Damian Priest	0	1
Danny Burch	0	1
"Dirty" Dominik Mysterio	0	1
Eric Young	0	1
Finn Bálor	0	1
JD McDonagh	0	1
Johnny Gargano	0	1
LA Knight	0	1
Lucien Price	0	1
Killian Dain	0	1
Oney Lorcan	0	1
Pat McAfee	0	1
Rezar	0	1
Ridge Holland	0	1
Royce Keys	0	1
Sheamus	0	1
Tama Tonga	0	1
Tonga Loa	0	1

==== Women ====
Wrestler	Victories	Appearances
Io Shirai/Iyo Sky	3	7
Rhea Ripley	3	5
Bianca Belair	3	4
Dakota Kai	2	4
Alexa Bliss	2	3
Charlotte Flair	2	3
Becky Lynch	2	3
Candice LeRae	2	3
Raquel González/Raquel Rodriquez	2	3
Bayley	1	4
Asuka	1	3
Kay Lee Ray	1	2
Mia Yim/Michin	1	2
Shotzi Blackheart	1	2
AJ Lee	1	1
Cora Jade	1	1
Naomi	1	1
Tegan Nox	1	1
Toni Storm	1	1
Jacy Jayne	0	2
Kairi Sane	0	2
Nia Jax	0	2
Ember Moon	0	1
Fallon Henley	0	1
Gigi Dolin	0	1
Jade Cargill	0	1
Lainey Reid	0	1
Lash Legend	0	1
Liv Morgan	0	1
Mandy Rose	0	1
Nikki Cross	0	1
Shayna Baszler	0	1
Stephanie Vaquer	0	1
Tatum Paxley	0	1
Tiffany Stratton	0	1

NWA

Wrestler	Victories	Appearances
Road Warrior Animal	13	13
Road Warrior Hawk	13	13
Dusty Rhodes	11	11
Nikita Koloff	11	11
Lex Luger	10	13
Sting	7	7
Paul Ellering	6	6
Steve Williams	4	4
Bobby Eaton	2	3
Stan Lane	2	3
Ron Garvin	2	2
Barry Windham	1	12
Ricky Morton	1	1
Robert Gibson	1	1
Arn Anderson	0	15
Tully Blanchard	0	15
Ric Flair	0	14
J.J. Dillon	0	13
Fatu	0	2
Jimmy Garvin	0	2
Michael Hayes	0	2
Samu	0	2
Terry Gordy	0	2
Big Bubba Rogers	0	1
The War Machine	0	1

WCW

Wrestler	Victories	Appearances
Sting	8	12
Lex Luger	4	6
El Gigante	4	4
The Yellow Dog	4	4
Kevin Nash	3	4
Barry Windham	3	6
Dustin Rhodes	3	3
Hollywood Hogan/Hulk Hogan	2	3
Nikita Koloff	1	5
Ric Flair	1	3
Scott Hall	1	2
Larry Zbyszko	1	2
Scott Steiner	1	2
Sid Vicious	1	2
Brian Knobs	1	1
Buff Bagwell	1	1
Davey Boy Smith	1	1
Diamond Dallas Page	1	1
Don Harris	1	1
Dusty Rhodes	1	1
Jeff Jarrett	1	1
Jerry Sags	1	1
Konnan	1	1
nWo Sting	1	1
Randy Savage	1	1
Ricky Steamboat	1	1
Robert Gibson	1	1
Roddy Piper	1	1
Ron Harris	1	1
Ron Simmons	1	1
The Shockmaster	1	1
The Warrior	1	1
Syxx	1	1
Tom Zenk	1	1
One Man Gang	0	5
Arn Anderson	0	4
Kevin Sullivan	0	4
Booker T/Kole	0	2
Kane/Stevie Ray	0	2
Bobby Eaton	0	1
Bret Hart	0	1
Brian Adams	0	1
Brian Pillman	0	1
Bryan Clark	0	1
Bunkhouse Buck	0	1
Cactus Jack	0	1
Chris Benoit	0	1
Curt Hennig	0	1
Goldberg	0	1
Kamala The Ugandan Giant	0	1
Meng	0	1
Richard Morton	0	1
Rick Rude	0	1
Rick Steiner	0	1
Robert Parker	0	1
Steve Austin	0	1
Steve McMichael	0	1
The Shark	0	1
The Zodiac	0	1
Terry Funk	0	1
Vader	0	1

== AEW version ==
All Elite Wrestling (AEW) announced during Revolution that it would debut their version of WarGames—dubbed "Blood and Guts"—on March 25, 2020, during a special episode of its weekly series Dynamite. Blood and Guts is based largely on the original Crockett-era WarGames rules, with a win condition of submission or surrender (no pinfalls, countouts, or escaping the cage). Unlike the classic format, there is no win condition when a wrestler is knocked unconscious; however, AEW concussion protocol goes into effect in that instance where the referee uses two-way radio communication to stop a match if a wrestler is unconscious or is knocked out by a concussion, and the doctor removes the concussed wrestlers if necessary. The inaugural match was announced to be The Elite (Adam Page, Cody Rhodes, Kenny Omega, Matt Jackson, and Nick Jackson) vs. The Inner Circle (Chris Jericho, Jake Hager, Sammy Guevara, Santana, and Ortiz). Nick Jackson was attacked by The Inner Circle, leaving him out indefinitely. The Inner Circle (Hager, Santana, and Ortiz) defeated The Elite (Page, Cody, and Matt Jackson) on the March 18 episode of Dynamite, giving them the entry advantage. After the match with The Elite seemingly expected to be outnumbered 5-on-4 going into the event, Matt Jackson revealed the debuting Matt Hardy as their fifth member. However, due to the COVID-19 pandemic, the event was cancelled.

The concept was reintroduced in April 2021, when Jericho announced that The Inner Circle would participate in the inaugural Blood and Guts match against The Pinnacle (MJF, Wardlow, Shawn Spears, Cash Wheeler, and Dax Harwood) at the Blood & Guts special episode of Dynamite on May 5, 2021. Blood & Guts would then become an annual tradition in AEW, with the event taking place as a special episode of Dynamite. The first ever women's Blood & Guts was on November 12, 2025, emanating from the First Horizon Coliseum in Greensboro, North Carolina.

=== Blood & Guts matches ===
#	Match	Event	Date	Venue	Location	Notes	Ref
1	The Pinnacle (MJF, Wardlow, Shawn Spears, Cash Wheeler, and Dax Harwood) defeated The Inner Circle (Chris Jericho, Jake Hager, Sammy Guevara, Santana, and Ortiz) by surrender (Note: Guevara surrendered on Jericho's behalf)	Blood & Guts 2021	May 5, 2021	Daily's Place	Jacksonville, Florida		
2	Eddie Kingston, Santana, Ortiz, and Blackpool Combat Club (Jon Moxley, Claudio Castagnoli, and Wheeler Yuta) defeated The Jericho Appreciation Society (Chris Jericho, Jake Hager, Sammy Guevara, Daniel Garcia, Matt Menard, and Angelo Parker) by submission	Blood & Guts 2022	June 29, 2022	Little Caesars Arena	Detroit, Michigan		
3	The Golden Elite (Kenny Omega, Matt Jackson, Nick Jackson, "Hangman" Adam Page, and Kota Ibushi) defeated Blackpool Combat Club (Jon Moxley, Claudio Castagnoli, and Wheeler Yuta), Konosuke Takeshita, and Pac by submission	Blood & Guts 2023	July 19, 2023	TD Garden	Boston, Massachusetts		
4	Team AEW (Swerve Strickland, Mark Briscoe, Darby Allin, Max Caster, and Anthony Bowens) defeated Team Elite (Matthew Jackson, Nicholas Jackson, Kazuchika Okada, Jack Perry, and "Hangman" Adam Page) by surrender (Note: Matthew Jackson surrendered on Perry's behalf)	Blood & Guts 2024	July 24, 2024	Bridgestone Arena	Nashville, Tennessee		
5	Triangle of Madness (Julia Hart, Skye Blue, and Thekla), Megan Bayne, Marina Shafir, and Mercedes Moné defeated Jamie Hayter, Willow Nightingale, Harley Cameron, Kris Statlander, and Timeless Love Bombs (Toni Storm and Mina Shirakawa) by surrender (Note: Storm surrendered on Shirakawa's behalf)	Blood & Guts 2025	November 12, 2025	First Horizon Coliseum	Greensboro, North Carolina		
6	The Conglomeration (Orange Cassidy, Kyle O'Reilly, Mark Briscoe), Roderick Strong, and Darby Allin defeated Death Riders (Jon Moxley, Claudio Castagnoli, Wheeler Yuta, Daniel Garcia, and Pac) by submission	Blood & Guts 2025	November 12, 2025	First Horizon Coliseum	Greensboro, North Carolina		
7	The Brawling Birds (Jamie Hayter and Alex Windsor), Wrathlander (Harley Cameron and Kris Statlander), Willow Nightingale, and Queen Aminata defeated Triangle of Madness (Thekla, Julia Hart, and Skye Blue), Divine Dominion (Lena Kross and Megan Bayne), and Persephone by submission	Blood & Guts 2026	November 4, 2026	VyStar Veterans Memorial Arena	Jacksonville, Florida		
8	The Don Callis Family (Kazuchika Okada, Kyle Fletcher, Wardlow, Kevin Knight, Mark Davis, and Jake Doyle) (with Don Callis) defeated Will Ospreay, Adam Copeland, Darby Allin, Steven Borden, and The Young Bucks (Matt Jackson and Nick Jackson) by surrender (Note: Copeland surrendered on his team's behalf.)	Blood & Guts 2026	November 4, 2026	VyStar Veterans Memorial Arena	Jacksonville, Florida		

== WCW variations ==
=== 1998 ===
In 1998, WCW decided to try something different and converted WarGames into a 3-team, 9-man competition (with the same cage and entry format, but they allowed pinfalls) for the #1 Contendership to the WCW World Heavyweight Title.

- Team WCW consisted of: Diamond Dallas Page, Roddy Piper, The Warrior
- Team Hollywood consisted of: Hollywood Hogan, Stevie Ray, Bret Hart
- Team Wolfpac consisted of: Kevin Nash, Sting, Lex Luger

Hogan entered the cage early, by force, so he and Stevie Ray could take out all the other participants, including their teammate Bret Hart. When Hogan went to pin Kevin Nash, smoke engulfed the ring and it appeared that The Warrior had magically entered the cage. Hogan and Stevie Ray beat him down, but more smoke appeared, and when it cleared away The Warrior was gone leaving Hogan holding his coat. The real Warrior then ran out from the back to enter the match. Hogan would eventually force his way out of the cage door, with Warrior following suit by climbing up the cage wall and kicking it in.

Davey Boy Smith suffered a near career ending back injury earlier that night after he fell on the trap door WCW used for this stunt. He became dependent on painkillers during his rehabilitation from this injury which would ultimately contribute to his early death. Perry Saturn was also injured from the trap door, but not as severely.

Page won the match by scoring the Diamond Cutter on Stevie Ray for the pinfall victory. He went on to Halloween Havoc to face Goldberg for the title, only to lose after being hit with a spear and Jackhammer.

=== 2000 ===
After the WarGames match was not held in 1999, Vince Russo brought back WarGames in a new format he called "WarGames 2000", with the tagline "Russo's Revenge". It was held on the September 4, 2000 episode of WCW Nitro. The match consisted of two teams vying for the WCW World Heavyweight Championship in a three-tiered cage first seen in the climax of the Warner Bros. Pictures (like WCW, a division of Time Warner, Inc.) film Ready to Rumble and later used at Slamboree in May 2000. The rules combined the traditional WarGames entry formats with the rules of the Triple Cage match at Slamboree, which required the competitors to scale the cages in order to retrieve the belt. There were two differences between the matches, however. Instead of the belt hanging above the roof of the third cage, it was instead placed inside said cage. Second, in order to win the match, someone had to escape from the bottom cage with the belt; this meant that a wrestler had to climb up through both cages, open the third cage to get the belt, and then climb back down and leave the cage all while avoiding the other participants who could steal the belt from him and take it for themselves without ever having to leave the bottom cage.

The match pitted Sting, Booker T, Goldberg, and KroniK (Brian Adams and Bryan Clark) against Russo's hand-picked team: WCW World Champion Kevin Nash, Jeff Jarrett, Scott Steiner, and himself.

The match had been scheduled as a four-on-four match, with Sting, Booker T, Goldberg and Ernest Miller against Nash, Jarrett, Steiner and Russo. Earlier in the night, each man from the first team was forced to wrestle a qualifying match to compete: Sting beat both Vampiro and The Great Muta in a handicap match, Goldberg defeated Shane Douglas, and Booker T had to defeat his brother Stevie Ray. However, Miller lost to KroniK in a handicap match, making it five-on-four. Thus, when it was his turn to enter, Russo came out with the Harris Brothers and had them interfere, making it 6 on 5.

During the match, Nash teased a betrayal: when he entered the first cage, he chokeslammed Sting then grabbed Steiner, Jarrett and Russo by the throats. However, as Russo was later walking to the door, Nash grabbed and hugged him.

The Harris Brothers and KroniK drove each other out of the arena. Booker T retrieved the belt from the top, but Russo interfered on behalf of his team. Ernest Miller ran interference kicking Russo but was Jackknife Powerbombed by Nash. Steiner and Jarrett handcuffed Sting and Booker to the walls of the second cage. Goldberg broke free of the handcuffs which held him to the turnbuckle of the ring and attempted to leave the cage with the belt, but was cut off by Bret Hart, who slammed the cage door in his face. Nash then retrieved the title belt and walked out the cage door, retaining the title.

== Other promotions ==
=== Combat Zone Wrestling ===
Combat Zone Wrestling has used WarGames stipulations the some of their Cage of Death events, the most recent being in Cage of Death XXI (2019). For Cage of Death 5, in that there were two rings; one of them was surrounded by the cage, and the other was filled with "one million" thumbtacks (the actual amount has never been verified). Above the two rings was scaffolding walkway on which the wrestlers could walk on at any time. The match started with two members of each team, and every 90 seconds a wrestler, from either team, entered the match according to the number they drew before the match started. These eliminations which will occurred in that would happen when a wrestler would hit the arena floor; however, Cage of Death 5 also had rules that the wrestlers who were not tossed out of or off the cage, that they could travel a scaffold hanging above another ring filled with thumbtacks to safety, scoring points for the team. For Cage of Death 6 there were eliminations that would happen when a wrestler would hit the arena floor much like Cage of Death 5 the year before, the difference being that the tag team titles were hanging on a scaffold stretched across the length of the top of the cage overlooking the two rings, plus all weapons littered around double caged ring.

Cage of Death 7 just had standard pinfall and submissions after all combatants entered the cage. For 2005's Cage of Death, the large eight-sided cage that surrounds the entire ringside area with a barbwire spidernet setup on one side and glass setup on another side with tables underneath and two scaffold platforms across the ring from each other. All different Hardcore and deathmatch wrestling weapons such as thumbtack turnbuckles, barbed wire bats, staple guns, light tubes, barbed wire, baseball bats, thumbtacks, panes of glass, and all others littered around it for wrestlers to use. The WarGames rules returned with pinfalls and submissions that could be done throughout the match after all combatants of either team entered the cage.

=== Extreme Championship Wrestling ===
Extreme Championship Wrestling (ECW) held a hardcore version of WarGames known as the "Ultimate Jeopardy steel cage match" at Ultimate Jeopardy 1994, between Shane Douglas, Mr. Hughes and The Public Enemy, and a team of Terry Funk, Road Warrior Hawk, Kevin Sullivan and The Tazmaniac; Its version allowed a victory by submission, pinfall, knockout, or surrender. Weapons were provided, and each participant carried a penalty stipulation that would take effect if they were the one defeated to win the match. Douglas would score a pinfall on Funk to win the match for his team and, per Funk's Ultimate Jeopardy stipulation, become the new ECW World Heavyweight Champion.

=== IWA Mid-South ===
Independent Wrestling Association Mid-South presented "No Blood, No Guts, No Glory 2005" at the National Guard Armory in Valparaiso, Indiana on Saturday night, July 2, 2005. The match pitted "Team Ian" Ian Rotten, Axl Rotten, Chris Hero, Corporal Robinson and Bull Pain against "Team Fannin" B. J. Whitmer, Eddie Kingston, Mark Wolf, J. C. Bailey, and Steve Stone and "Team NWA" Eric Priest, Chandler McClure, Tank and Sal and Vito Thomaselli in a double-ring, double-cage, three-team War Games match, with the winning team taking full control of the IWA-MS. The match was won when JC Bailey caused his own team to be outnumbered, allowing Ian Rotten's Team IWA to capitalize and win the match.

=== Major League Wrestling ===
Two WarGames matches would be promoted by Major League Wrestling (MLW), who owned the trademark for "WarGames" between 2007 and 2017.

On September 19, 2003, the WarGames TV Taping was held at the Fort Lauderdale, FL War Memorial Auditorium. The Funkin' Army (Terry Funk, The Sandman, Steve Williams, Sabu, and Bill Alfonso) defeated The Extreme Horsemen (Steve Corino, Simon Diamond, C. W. Anderson, PJ Walker, and Barry Windham) when Funk made Corino submit following a fireball to Corino's face.

In 2018, MLW would return to Fort Lauderdale for a second WarGames event, which was a TV taping for MLW Fusion on BeIN Sports. It would be MLW's last WarGames event after WWE acquired the rights and trademarks.

Since 2019, MLW has promoted the similarly-styled War Chamber matches, which took place in a singular, steel-caged ring. The 2024 edition will see two matches take place inside a two-ring steel cage.

=== New Japan Pro-Wrestling ===
At The New Beginning in Osaka on February 11, 2024, New Japan Pro-Wrestling held a ten-man no-DQ "Dog Pound" match between the Bullet Club War Dogs (David Finlay, Gabe Kidd, Alex Coughlin, Clark Connors and Drilla Moloney) and United Empire (Will Ospreay, Jeff Cobb, Henare, Francesco Akira and TJP). The steel cage was essentially a fence situated around the ring. The first period between Ospreay and Finlay was supposedly scheduled for two minutes, but pre-match negotiations between the two wrestlers resulted in a five minute period; the remaining wrestlers entered the match at two-minute intervals (United Empire allowed the War Dogs members to enter first). A recap of the match written for New Japan's English-language web site stated that it was "arguably the most violent... in NJPW's history", as weapons were liberally employed. The match ended when Finlay pinned Ospreay after he was hit by Finlay's Overkill finishing move. This match is also notable for being Coughlin's final match before his retirement on March 23rd.

=== Pro Wrestling Unplugged ===
Pro Wrestling Unplugged (PWU) had held a match called "Cuffed and Caged" match on January 20, 2007. It is somewhat similar to a Lethal Lockdown match in TNA, but with a few small differences.

Two teams of five wrestlers take part in this match. Starts with one member of each team, with one new member added to the match at certain time intervals until all ten are in.

The main differences between this match and a Lethal Lockdown and WarGames match, is that in this match wrestlers are eliminated by pin or submit in the cage or getting handcuffed to the outside of the cage. The winner is the one man or team left standing after all members of opposing team are eliminated.

=== Pro-Wrestling:EVE ===
Pro-Wrestling: EVE presented the second ever all female War Games match. It had a steel cage surrounding only the one ring, but all other rules were the same as the original concept. It was the opening contest as part of the first WrestleQueendom event in the iconic York Hall, in Bethnal Green, London on Saturday 5 May 2018. The teams of "Squad Goals" consisting of Rhia O’Reily, Laura Di Matteo, Addy Starr and Emi Sakura and "The Deserving" made up of Jamie Hayter, Charli Evans, Jayla Dark and Blue Nikita competed in the bout. Highlights include a brawl outside the cage before the match started, O'Reilly entering the cage last and diving onto all the competitors and Squad Goals locking in a submission on each member of The Deserving to win the match.

=== Ring of Honor ===
In December 2005, Ring of Honor held the first Steel Cage Warfare match. It was used to settle the year-long feud between Generation Next and their former leader Alex Shelley, who was now with The Embassy. The match consisted of only one ring but followed the War Games match in that two wrestlers from each team started the match, and after five minutes another wrestler would enter, then every two minutes after another wrestler would enter. The main difference, however, is that the match was an elimination match contested by teams of three, four, or more. Wrestlers can be eliminated at any point by either pin fall or submission.

In July 2006, Ring of Honor held another War Games style match to settle their feud with Combat Zone Wrestling. ROH challenged them to a Steel Cage Warfare match, but CZW said they would only compete if it were their Cage of Death match. This match that could be contested under WarGames rules so the match can only end when all members of both teams have entered the cage. The cage itself is a yellow-steel wired and eight-sided, and surrounds the entire ringside area. All sorts of weapons surround between the ring and the cage walls. The match starts 2 men for 5 minutes, then having a coin flip to see what team would have the advantage with a new man entering every two minutes.

In September 2008, Ring of Honor held a three 'team' Steel Cage Warfare match. This pitted the team of The Briscoe Brothers and Austin Aries, against the team of The Age of the Fall represented by Delirious, Jimmy Jacobs and Tyler Black, against Necro Butcher who fought alone with no partners. The match was held under the same rules, stating Butcher although alone could be drawn and enter the match at any time regardless of a man advantage held by the other teams.

In June 2013, another Steel Cage Warfare match was held, pitting an ROH team of B. J. Whitmer, Michael Elgin, Jay Lethal and Kevin Steen against the S.C.U.M. team of Jimmy Jacobs, Rhino, Cliff Compton and Rhett Titus, where if the ROH team wins, S.C.U.M. must disband, but if the S.C.U.M. team wins, Steve Corino replaces Nigel McGuinness as match maker. Team ROH won the match on a taped episode of Ring of Honor Wrestling television.

=== Tennessee ===
==== Smoky Mountain Wrestling (Knoxville) ====
The Knoxville, Tennessee-based Smoky Mountain Wrestling (SMW) had their own variation of the WarGames match, called Rage in a Cage. In Rage in a Cage, the ring was surrounded by a cage made of the wooden frameworks and regular fence wires. The match began with one member of each team entering the cage. After five minutes, a member from one of the teams (usually determined by a coin toss) would enter the cage, giving his team the temporary handicap advantage. After two minutes, a member from the other team would enter to even the odds. Once all eight or ten men (depending on team size) had entered the cage, the match begins. The object of the match was to eliminate one-by-one by submitting or handcuffing all members of the opposing team to and in the cage. The first Rage in a Cage match was held at the Civic Coliseum in Knoxville on May 9, 1993, with the Rock 'n' Roll Express (Ricky Morton and Robert Gibson), The Stud Stable (Robert Fuller and Jimmy Golden), and Brian Lee defeating The Heavenly Bodies (Tom Prichard and Stan Lane), Killer Kyle, Kevin Sullivan, and The Tazmaniac.

==== United States Wrestling Association (Memphis) ====
In the summer of 1995, an inter-promotional feud between Smoky Mountain Wrestling and the Memphis, Tennessee-based United States Wrestling Association saw the match move across the state. On August 7, 1995, the Rage in a Cage match was held at the Mid-South Coliseum in Memphis, which saw Team USWA (Bill Dundee, Billy Jack Haynes, Tommy Rich, Doug Gilbert, Brian Lee, Steven Dunn, & PG-13 (J. C. Ice and Wolfie D)) defeat Team SMW (Tracy Smothers, Robert Gibson, Brad Armstrong, Buddy Landell, The Heavenly Bodies (Tom Prichard and Jimmy Del Ray), Terry Gordy, Pat Tanaka & D-Lo Brown).

=== TNA Wrestling ===
Total Nonstop Action Wrestling (TNA) first introduced their own variation of the WarGames match with the "Wednesday Bloody Wednesday" steel cage match on September 3, 2003. While it only used a single ring surrounded by a steel cage, poles attached to the ring posts above the turnbuckles had chains running to various points in the ring with many weapons hanging from the chains. Similarly to a War Games match, two wrestlers from both teams started the match, and after ninety seconds another wrestler would enter. The only way to win was by pinfall or submission.

Later, TNA introduced the Lethal Lockdown match for their annual Lockdown pay-per-view. Although again featuring only one ring enclosed by a steel cage, the match otherwise followed the format of the original War Games match, with two teams and a staggered entry system. Like the original NWA/WCW version, when all competitors have entered the ring, a roof is lowered onto the top of the cage, with the addition of various weapons hanging from it. Victory can be attained only by pinfall or submission. As TNA used a six-sided ring from June 2004 to January 2010, and again from June 2014 to January 2018, the cage used for the Lethal Lockdown matches during those periods was also six-sided, branded as the "Six Sides of Steel". The last Lethal Lockdown match was in 2016, as plans to revive it in 2020 were scuttled by the COVID-19 pandemic. A similar match was done in 2025 at Sacrifice without the weapons roof. A five-on-five "TNA vs NXT" cage match took place in a single caged ring on the December 18, 2025 episode of TNA Impact!. Though it was called simply a "steel cage match," the bout had the same stipulations as a WarGames match like in Sacrifice.

=== United Wrestling Federation ===
On September 21, 2007, United Wrestling Federation held a WarGames match in Richmond, Virginia. Team Sgt. Slaughter (Rick and Scott Steiner; Dustin Rhodes and Kirby and TJ Mack) defeated Team JBL (Homicide and Hernandez; Steve Corino; CW Anderson and Elix Skipper) in a double ring double cage WarGames match, dubbed as and titled "Uncivil War", when Scott Steiner submitted Corino with the Steiner Recliner as Slaughter simultaneously submitted JBL with the cobra clutch.

=== Women Superstars Uncensored ===
Women Superstars Uncensored presented the first ever War Games match with female wrestlers on November 19, 2011, as part of their Breaking Barriers II iPPV. The match featured two trios - Team WSU of Mercedes Martinez, Alicia and Brittney Savage, and the Midwest Militia of Jessicka Havok, Allysin Kay and Sassy Stephie. The match was contested in a steel cage surrounding only one ring, but all other rules were the same as the original concept. The Midwest Militia won the match when Havok threatened to murder an injured Martinez with a machete, and Savage surrendered on Martinez's behalf.

=== World Wrestling Entertainment/WWE ===
In June 2013, WWE released a DVD anthology set, War Games: WCW's Most Notorious Matches.

During the November 2017 tapings for WWE NXT, it was announced that at NXT TakeOver: Houston, the main event would be a WarGames match. The event was subsequently renamed to NXT TakeOver: WarGames. This would be the first official WarGames match in nearly 20 years. The match was quite different from standard WarGames- including the cage having no roof (although escaping the cage forfeited the match for that person's team), pinfalls being allowed, and all remaining members of a team entering at the same time. The match involved three teams, with The Undisputed Era defeating Sanity and Roderick Strong/The Authors of Pain.

NXT TakeOver events preceding WWE's Survivor Series pay-per-view have since continued to be headlined by WarGames, with NXT TakeOver: WarGames (2019) featuring two WarGames matches, one of which was WWE's first-ever women's WarGames match.

In 2022, WWE moved the WarGames from NXT onto their main roster with both Men's & Women's matches taking place at Survivor Series (2022). The Women's match featured Team Belair (Bianca Belair, Alexa Bliss, Asuka, Mia Yim, and Becky Lynch) defeating Team Bayley (Damage CTRL (Bayley, Dakota Kai, and Iyo Sky), Nikki Cross, and Rhea Ripley). The main event consisted of The Bloodline (Roman Reigns, Sami Zayn, Solo Sikoa, and The Usos (Jey Uso and Jimmy Uso)) (with Paul Heyman) defeating The Brawling Brutes (Sheamus, Ridge Holland, and Butch), Drew McIntyre, and Kevin Owens.

=== Xtreme Pro Wrestling ===
Rob Black's Xtreme Pro Wrestling promotion also capitalized on the popularity of the WarGames match by holding one of their own, called "Genocide", with the same rules. However, in the XPW version of the WarGames match, an 18-feet-high steel cage that encompassed two rings with weapons are in two rings but the three-sided cage top that covers over, around and on the top of only one of the two rings, which surrounded by large steel cage, permitting wrestlers to (hypothetically) brawl each other at a top the cage and do table spots off the top of the cage, plus all weapons permitted and provided; the cage, however, was extremely poorly constructed, and started to fall apart during the match, preventing most of the promised action.
