= War Chamber =

- Promotions: Major League Wrestling
- First event: War Chamber (2019)

MLW War Chamber is a professional wrestling supercard event produced by Major League Wrestling (MLW) that was first held on September 7, 2019. The event serves as a successor and replacement for MLW WarGames, after WWE acquired the rights to the trademarks of the namesake WarGames match in 2019.

The first event served as a television taping for MLW Fusion, while the second event was taped for the MLW Fusion: Alpha miniseries, and the third event was taped for MLW Underground Wrestling.

== Dates and venues ==
Aired Live

#	Event	Date	City	Venue	Main Event	Notes	Ref
1	War Chamber (2019)	September 7, 2019	North Richland Hills, Texas	NYTEX Sports Centre	Team Von Erichs (Marshall Von Erich, Ross Von Erich, Low Ki, and Tom Lawlor) (with Kevin Von Erich) vs. Contra Unit (Ikuro Kwon, Jacob Fatu, Josef Samael, and Simon Gotch) in a War Chamber match	The main event aired on September 14, 2019	
2	War Chamber (2021)	November 6, 2021	Philadelphia, Pennsylvania	2300 Arena	Contra Unit (Ikuro Kwon, Jacob Fatu, Mads Krügger, Sentai Death Squad Soldier #1, and Sentai Death Squad Soldier #1) vs. The Hammerheads (Alexander Hammerstone, EJ Nduka, Richard Holliday, Matanza Duran, and Savio Vega) in a War Chamber match	The main event aired on November 17, 2021.	
3	War Chamber (2023)	April 6, 2023	Queens, New York	Melrose Ballroom	Alexander Hammerstone and The Second Gear Crew (Mance Warner, Matthew Justice, and 1 Called Manders) vs. The Calling (Rickey Shane Page, Delirious, Akira, and Dr. Cornwallus) in a War Chamber match	The main event aired on April 18, 2023.	
4	War Chamber (2024)	March 29, 2024	St. Petersburg, Florida	The Coliseum	Team MLW (CozyMax (Satoshi Kojima and Shigeo Okumura) and The Second Gear Crew (Matthew Justice and 1 Called Manders)) vs. World Titan Federation (Tom Lawlor, Davey Boy Smith Jr., Richard Holliday, and Josh Bishop) (with Mister Saint Laurent) in a War Chamber match		
5	War Chamber (2025)	May 10, 2025	Cicero, Illinois	Cicero Stadium	The Bomaye Fight Club (Alex Kane and Mr. Thomas), Matthew Justice, and Paul London vs. The Rogue Horsemen (Bobby Fish, Brett Ryan Gosselin, Brock Anderson, and C. W. Anderson) in a War Chamber match	Aired June 7, 2025	
