= Sonjay Dutt =

American professional wrestler (born 1982)

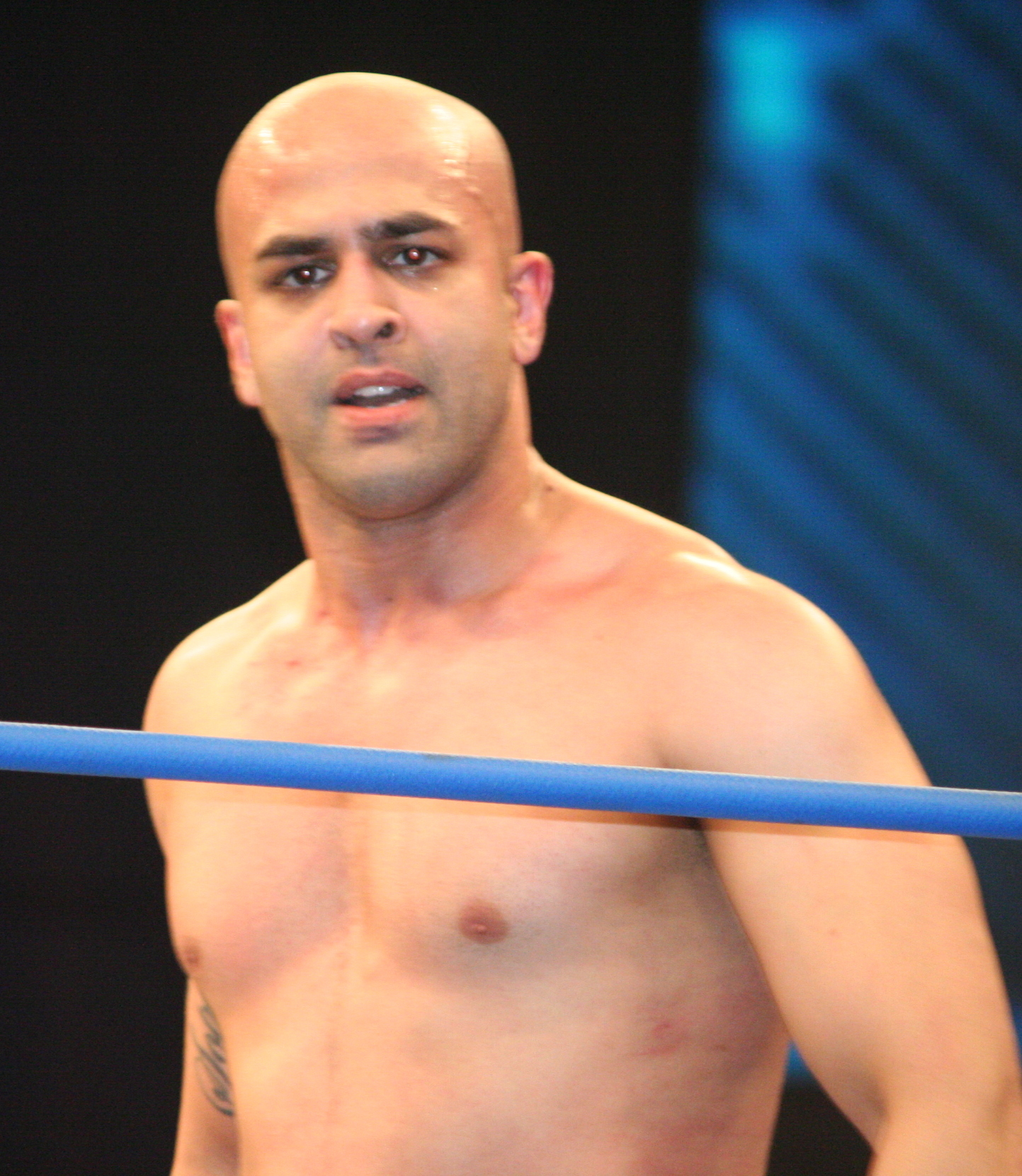
- Dutt in 2017

Personal information
- Born: Retesh Bhalla; April 7, 1982 (age 44) Washington, D.C., U.S.

Professional wrestling career
- Ring name(s): Monster J Schwagg Dutt; Sonjay Dutt
- Billed height: 5 ft 6 in (168 cm)
- Billed weight: 186 lb (84 kg)
- Billed from: Mumbai, India; Bollywood, India
- Trained by: Jimmy Z
- Debut: September 2000

Retesh Bhalla (born April 7, 1982) is an American professional wrestler best known under the ring name Sonjay Dutt. He is currently signed to All Elite Wrestling (AEW), where he works as a producer and manager. He is best known for his time with Total Nonstop Action / Impact Wrestling, where he is a former TNA X Division Champion, and has also worked for WWE as a producer from 2019 to 2021.

Bhalla has also competed for Jeff Jarrett's Global Force Wrestling, where he was a former GFW NEX*GEN Champion. Dutt also wrestled for the independent promotion Combat Zone Wrestling during his early years, where he captured the CZW World Junior Heavyweight Championship and won the Best of the Best tournament in 2004. Due to his contributions, he was inducted into the CZW Hall of Fame in 2019.

== Professional wrestling career ==
=== Early life and career (2000–2004) ===
Bhalla was born and raised in Washington D.C. He is of Punjabi descent, as his parents had migrated from Punjab, India to the United States before he was born, though most of his extended family still lives in New Delhi.

Bhalla performed for KYDA Pro wrestling for the first two years of his professional career. He got his first break wrestling in Major League Wrestling (MLW) in 2003, where he debuted the ring name Sonjay Dutt (modeled after that of Bollywood actor Sanjay Dutt) and debuted the Dragon Rana on Jimmy Yang at the promotion's August 3 event, Summer Apocalypse. Dutt would go on to win an international tournament, hosted by MLW in September 2003 to win the company's Junior Heavyweight Championship, defeating Tony Mamaluke, Eddie Colón, and Christopher Daniels. In an early 2004 MLW Junior Heavyweight Title match Dutt pinned Jack Evans to retain the title at MLW Reloaded.

=== NWA Total Nonstop Action (2003–2009) ===
Dutt made his debut for NWA Total Nonstop Action (TNA) on October 15, 2003, when he teamed with Eric Young to defeat Jerrelle Clark and El Fuego in a tag team match. He began working regularly for the promotion the following year. In May 2004, Dutt began a Best of Three Series with Amazing Red to determine the number one contender to the TNA X Division Championship, which Red won. Throughout the summer of 2004 Dutt participated in the America's X-Cup as a part of Team USA along with Jerry Lynn, Chris Sabin, and Elix Skipper against Team AAA (Héctor Garza, Mr. Águila, Juventud Guerrera, and Abismo Negro). After several months, Dutt became the onscreen protégé of Sabu, with Raven using him to vicariously assault Sabu. In addition, Dutt acted as a mouthpiece for the perpetually mute Sabu. This angle was postponed and then dropped after Sabu was sidelined with various health problems, and in the interim Dutt made appearances with World Wrestling Entertainment, provoking rumors of an imminent contract offer.

Dutt's presence in TNA was reduced in late-2004 and early-2005 during the tenure of Dusty Rhodes as booker, but his role within the promotion was once again expanded after Rhodes resigned. Dutt won a four-way X Division match at No Surrender on July 17, 2005, to qualify for the 2005 Super X Cup. He lost to Samoa Joe, however, in the first round of the tournament.

In September 2005, Dutt, Shark Boy, and Simon Diamond spent two weeks in India, where they visited several cities, promoting the debut of Impact! on ESPN Star Sports. On September 28 in Bhopal, a riot broke out when 1000 fans were excluded from an event after attendance exceeded expectations. None of the three TNA wrestlers were injured.

At Bound for Glory on October 23, Dutt defeated Austin Aries, Roderick Strong, and Alex Shelley in a four way X Division match on the pre-show. In 2006, Dutt earned a spot on Team USA in the 2006 World X Cup.

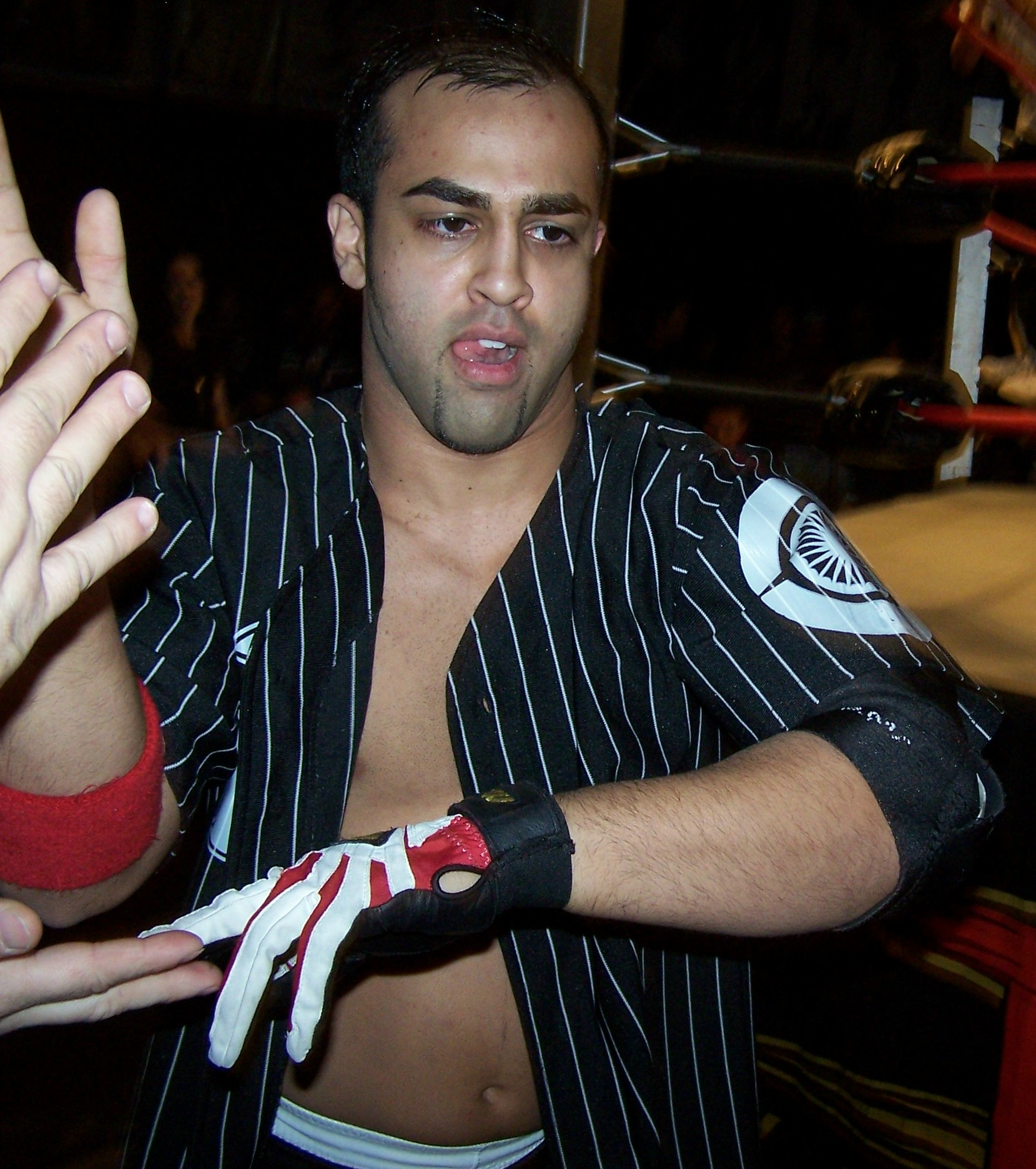
Dutt in 2006

Throughout late 2006 and early 2007, Dutt was involved in the Paparazzi Championship Series, led by Kevin Nash, who insinuated throughout the PCS Challenge that Dutt was taking steroids, as a running joke, which would usually lead to the hotheaded Dutt comically losing his temper. Although he did not win the series, it put him over with the fans. After PCS ended, Nash took Dutt and his newfound tag team partner Jay Lethal under his wing and promised to give them an extreme makeover. After Lethal got a new character mimicking the "Macho Man" Randy Savage, Nash attempted to get Dutt a new character as well. All of these attempts were Kevin Nash's past gimmicks, including Oz, Vinnie Vegas, and Diesel, all of which Dutt despised.

On the April 26 episode of Impact!, Dutt and Lethal won a shot at the X Division Championship held by Chris Sabin at Sacrifice. Dutt was unhappy at Lethal getting the pinfall, however, Dutt and Lethal started fighting with each other. Kevin Nash came out and separated the two, but Dutt kicked him and left the ring. On a later episode of Impact!, Dutt apologized to Nash and claimed "it was the heat of the moment". Nash forgave Dutt but warned him not to do it again.

On June 7, Dutt introduced a new gimmick reminiscent of a New Age guru in which he called himself "The Guru" Sonjay Dutt. As part of the gimmick, he began dressing all in white, and apologized to Nash and Lethal for his behavior. At Victory Road, Dutt competed in the 10 man Ultimate X match in an attempt to become the number one contender for the X Division Championship, but was eliminated in the Gauntlet portion of the match.

Dutt and Lethal began to have some problems when Dutt began showing interest in Lethal's on-screen girlfriend SoCal Val. Dutt participated in the Xscape match at Lockdown where he was the first participant eliminated. At Slammiversary, Dutt ruined Lethal and SoCal Val's wedding, when he begged Val to marry him instead. Dutt attacked Lethal, and began a villainous turn, which led to Dutt and Lethal facing off in matches at Victory Road and Hard Justice, splitting the victories. At No Surrender, Val turned on Lethal and assisted Dutt in winning a "Ladder of Love" ladder match. On February 20, 2009, Dutt left TNA after his contract expired due to him and TNA management being unable to come to terms on a new deal.

=== Independent circuit (2009–2019) ===
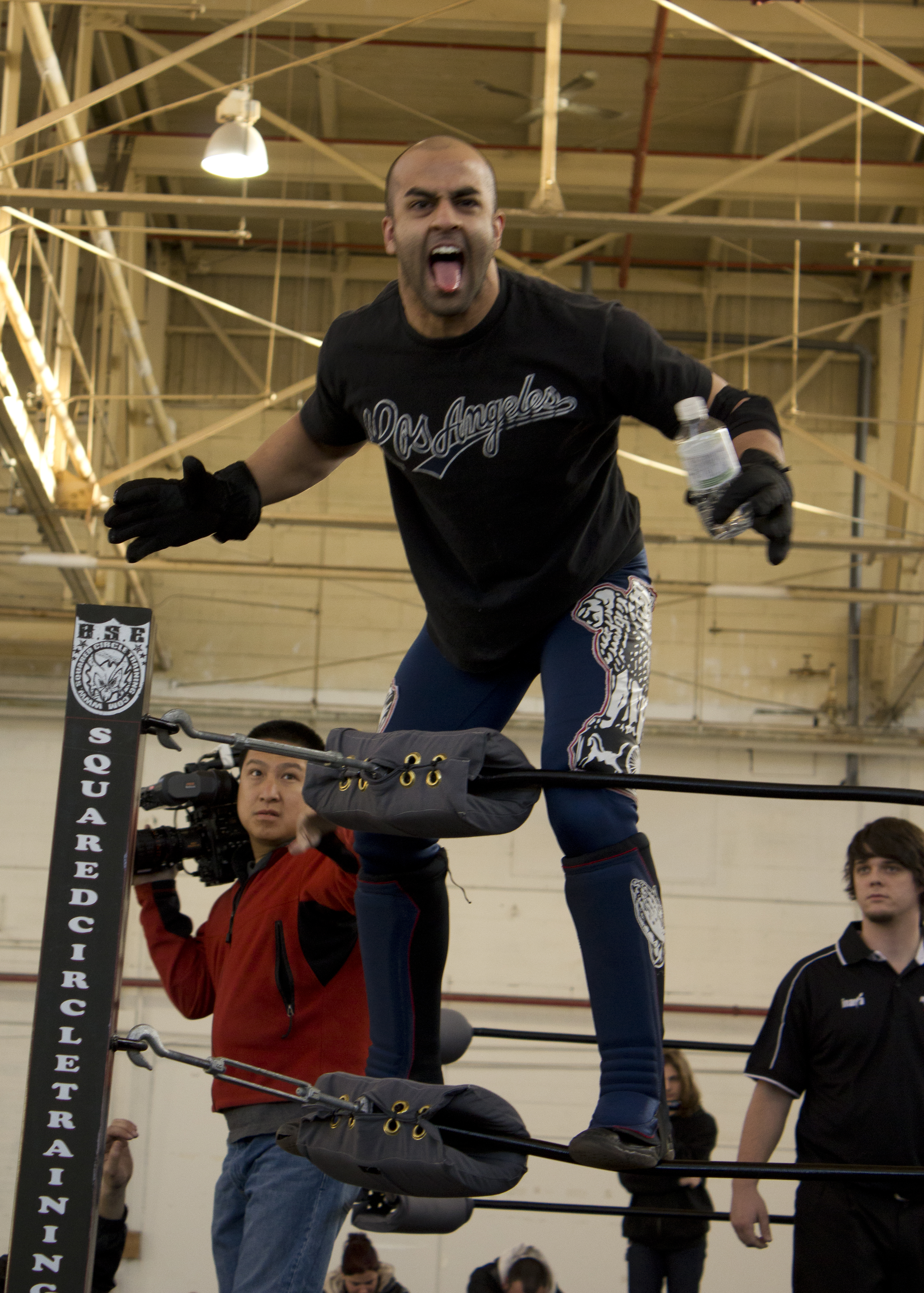
Dutt in January 2011

Since making his TNA debut, he has worked for independent promotions such as Ring of Honor, UWA, Combat Zone Wrestling, MXW Pro Wrestling, VCW and NWA Virginia and has toured Japan with Pro Wrestling Zero1. He also has wrestled for HUSTLE in Japan as a member of the stable Takada Monster Army under the ring name "Monster J". On July 28, 2006, Dutt lost to Último Dragón in UWA. In November 2006, Sonjay returned to UWA and won the 2006 Grand Prix Tournament Championship.

On May 9, 2008, Dutt was announced as the eighth and final participant in the Chikara 2008 Rey de Voladores tournament, having previously competed in the 2007 King of Trios alongside The Motor City Machine Guns (Alex Shelley and Chris Sabin) as Team TNA. On June 21, 2008, he appeared at a Combat Zone Wrestling show, where he was defeated by Pinkie Sanchez. He appeared on the July 12, 2008 show to team with Chuck Taylor in a losing effort against Pinkie Sanchez and Ruckus. On September 19, 2008, he teamed up with Shelley and Sabin to challenge Último Guerrero, Atlantis, and Negro Casas for the CMLL World Trios Championship at the company's 75th Anniversary Show, but were unable to defeat the reigning champions.

After leaving TNA, Dutt returned to Japan to compete for Pro Wrestling Zero1, after a four-year hiatus, and on March 15, 2009, defeated Ikuto Hidaka to win the Zero1 International Junior Heavyweight Championship. Dutt vacated the title on November 29, 2009, for the Tenka-Ichi 2009 tournament. He attempted to regain the title, but was eliminated from the tournament in the semifinals by Prince Devitt.

Dutt made his Pro Wrestling Guerrilla debut on April 11, 2009, at Ninety-Nine, where he defeated Roderick Strong in a singles match. The following day at One Hundred, the promotion's 100th show, he was defeated by El Generico. Since leaving TNA, Dutt has also begun making appearances for Ring of Honor. He made his return to the company on May 8, 2009, in Boston, Massachusetts, wrestling in a 3-way dance with Eddie Edwards and Bryan Danielson, who ended up winning the match. On August 31 Dutt made his Ring of Honor Wrestling debut in a losing effort against Delirious, with whom he would feud for the rest of the year.

After an eleven-month break from Ring of Honor, Dutt returned to the promotion on December 17, 2010, replacing an injured Kenny Omega and facing ROH World Champion Roderick Strong in a losing effort in a non–title match. At the following day's Final Battle 2010 pay-per-view Dutt again replaced Omega and faced Eddie Edwards in another losing effort.

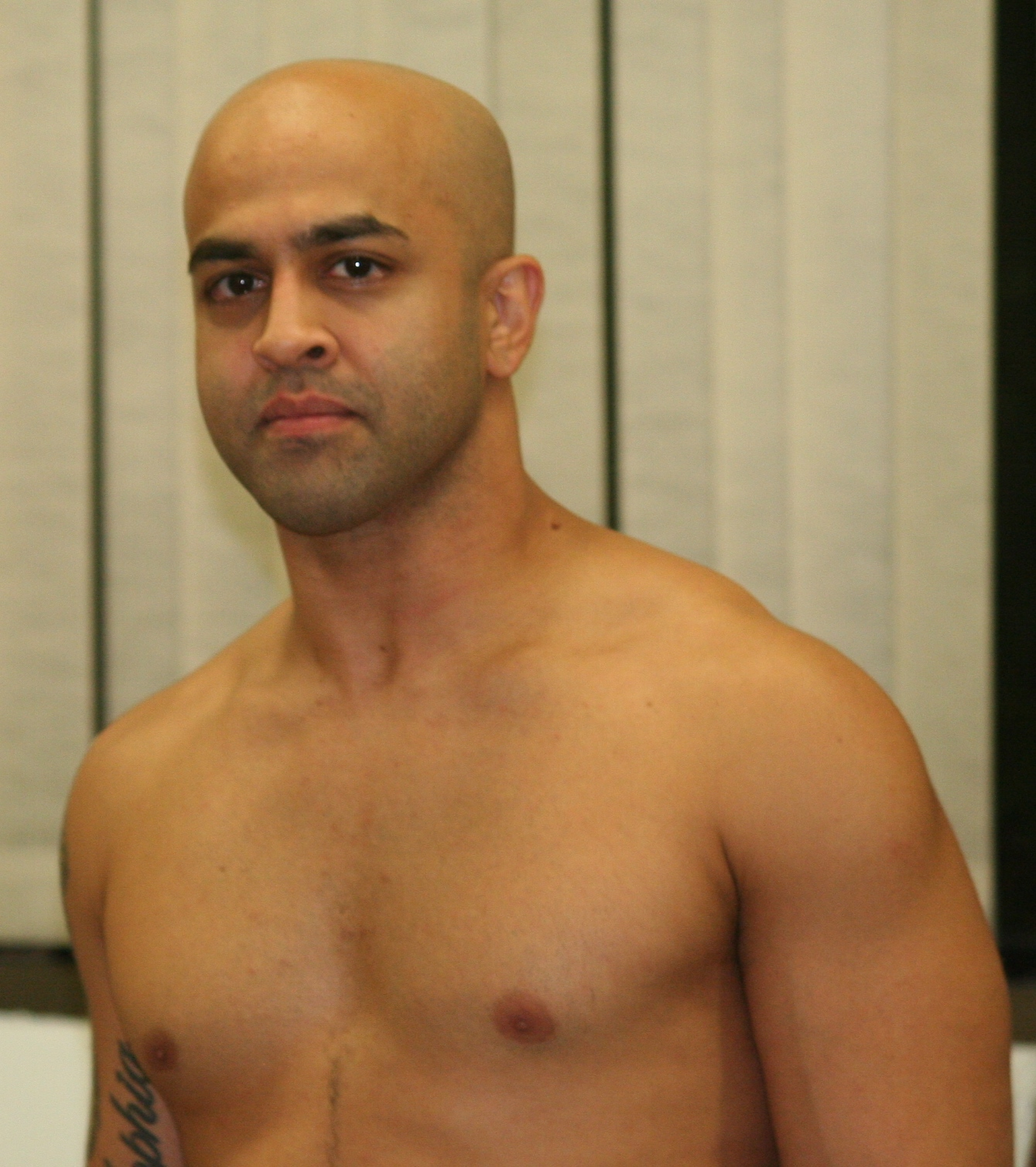
Dutt in November 2015

In 2011, it was revealed that Dutt would take part in a new hiphop/pro wrestling collaboration, the Urban Wrestling Federation, with taping of the first event "First Blood" taking place on June 3. On June 19 Dutt, working under the ring name Schwagg Dutt, was announced as being a part of the roster of All Wheels Wrestling. At the pilot tapings on June 29, Dutt was first defeated in a five-minute Iron Man match by Aaron Aguilera, before defeating him, Dubai and RPM (Jay Lethal) in an Ultimate X match. In December 2011, Dutt took part in TNA's India project, Ring Ka King. On July 27, 2013, Dutt was defeated by Jay Lethal in the first round for the vacant ROH World Championship. On November 9, 2013, Dutt defeated Ben Ortiz at House of Hardcore 3. Sonjay, along with Zema Ion appeared on Singapore Pro Wrestling's Collision on January 11, 2014. He faced Russian wrestler Serg White. On March 12, 2014, Sonjay dutt was defeated by El Ligero In a Revolution Pro event. On May 5, 2014, At Continental Wrestling Federation Dutt defeated John Morrison to Capture the CWF United States Championship. Dutt defeated Eita Kobayashi In a Wrestling City Asia event.

On October 12, 2016, Dutt competed in a four-way match against Fenix el Rey, Jonathan Gresham, and Jeff Cobb at a Lucha Ilimitado card in Yakima, Washington with Fenix winning (to be crowned the first Corazon de Oro champion).

On March 4, 2017, at ROH Manhattan Mayhem 2017 Dutt was unsuccessful at winning the ROH World Television Championship against Marty Scurll.

=== Return to TNA (2012–2013) ===
On June 28, 2012, Dutt returned to TNA, defeating Rubix to qualify for a tournament for the TNA X Division Championship. On July 8 at Destination X, Dutt defeated Rashad Cameron to qualify for the finals of the tournament. Later that same event, Dutt was defeated by Zema Ion in the final Ultimate X match, which also included Kenny King and Mason Andrews. During the match, Dutt legitimately separated his shoulder and had to leave the match momentarily to get it popped back into place. Dutt returned on the July 26 episode of Impact Wrestling as one of four men vying for a shot at the X Division Championship, however, TNA World Heavyweight Champion Austin Aries opted not to grant him the shot due to his injured shoulder, instead naming Kenny King the number one contender. Dutt returned to TNA during the August 31 and September 1 house shows, working against Zema Ion. On September 5, Dutt was named the number one contender to Ion's X Division Championship at No Surrender. Four days later, Dutt was defeated in his pay-per-view title match. On the September 13 episode of Impact Wrestling, Dutt again unsuccessfully challenged Ion for the X Division Championship. On January 12, 2013, Dutt returned to TNA to take part in TNA X-Travaganza, teaming with Petey Williams in a tag team match, where they were defeated by Christopher Daniels and Kazarian. Dutt returned to Impact Wrestling on March 21, unsuccessfully challenging Kenny King for the X Division Championship in a three-way match, also involving Zema Ion. On July 18, Dutt won a 3-way match against Homicide and Petey Williams to get a shot at the X-Division Title on July 25. On July 25, Dutt was defeated by Manik in the Ultimate X for the TNA X Division Championship, which also included Greg Marasciulo. On August 21, Dutt returned to Impact Wrestling where he wrestled against TNA X Division Champion Manik in a losing effort. On December 30, 2013, Dutt was part of TNA #Old School wrestled against Chris Sabin and Austin Aries in a three-way dance, where Aries emerged victorious.

=== Global Force Wrestling (2015–2016) ===
On May 13, 2015, Global Force Wrestling (GFW) announced Dutt as part of their roster. On June 12, 2015, Dutt made his GFW debut defeating Jamin Olivencia during a GFW Grand Slam Tour event in Jackson, Tennessee, which was the promotions inaugural event. The following night, Dutt teamed with Chase Owens defeating the team of Jason Kincaid and Jamin Olivencia.

On July 10, 2015, during a GFW Grand Slam Tour event in Erie, Pennsylvania, Dutt teamed with Moose defeating Olivencia and Jon Bolen. On July 24, 2015, during the first ever TV Tapings for GFW Amped, Dutt was defeated by Jigsaw in the first round of the GFW NEX*GEN Championship tournament. On November 27, 2015, Dutt defeated P. J. Black for the GFW NEX*GEN Championship.

Dutt retained in his first international title defense on March 2, 2016, retaining over Marty Scurll in Exeter, UK. On May 13, 2016, Dutt defeated DJ Z and Lio Rush in a triple threat match at a GFW/MCW joint event to retain the GFW NEX*GEN Championship. On November 25, 2016, Dutt lost the GFW NEX*GEN Championship to Cody Rhodes.

=== Second return to Impact Wrestling (2017–2019) ===
In April 2017, it was announced that Dutt would be working as a producer for TNA, now Impact Wrestling. On the April 20 episode of Impact, Dutt surprised everyone by making his in-ring return in a six-way X Division title match. However, during the match he sustained a serious eye injury which effectively ruled him out of the contest. After its conclusion Dutt was treated backstage by the Impact Wrestling medical team. At the Impact Wrestling taping in Mumbai, India, on May 30, 2017, Dutt challenged and defeated then X Division Champion Low-Ki to win his first ever Impact Wrestling championship. After his victory he was emotional and celebrated with fellow wrestlers including Mahabali Shera, Eddie Edwards, Swoggle, Braxton Sutter and Matt Sydal, and also celebrated with the fans in the audience including Mohin Khan. At Slammiversary XV he retained his X Division Championship against Low Ki in a two out of three falls match. At Destination X, he defeated Trevor Lee in a Ladder Match to retain X Division Championship. On the September 14 episode of Impact, Dutt lost the title to Lee, ending his reign at 81 days. At Bound for Glory, Dutt competed in a Six-way match for the Impact X Division Championship which was won by Trevor Lee. on the November 9 episode of Impact, Dutt lost to Matt Sydal. On the November 16 episode of Impact, Dutt, Dezmond Xavier and Garza Jr. defeated Andrew Everett, Taiji Ishimori and Trevor Lee. On the January 11, 2018 episode of Impact, Dutt, Dezmond Xavier and Garza Jr. defeated Caleb Konley, Hakim Zane and Trevor Lee.

On January 6, 2018, Dutt announced he would undergo surgery to fix a torn right Achilles. On the February 8, 2018, episode of Impact Wrestling, Dutt returned as he and Josh Mathews became the new commentary team and remained on commentary until April 19, 2018. On January 23, 2019, it was reported that Dutt had been granted his release from Impact Wrestling.

=== WWE (2019–2021) ===
On January 23, 2019, Dutt signed with WWE as a producer. On June 29, 2021, it was reported that Dutt had departed from WWE.

=== All Elite Wrestling (2021–present) ===
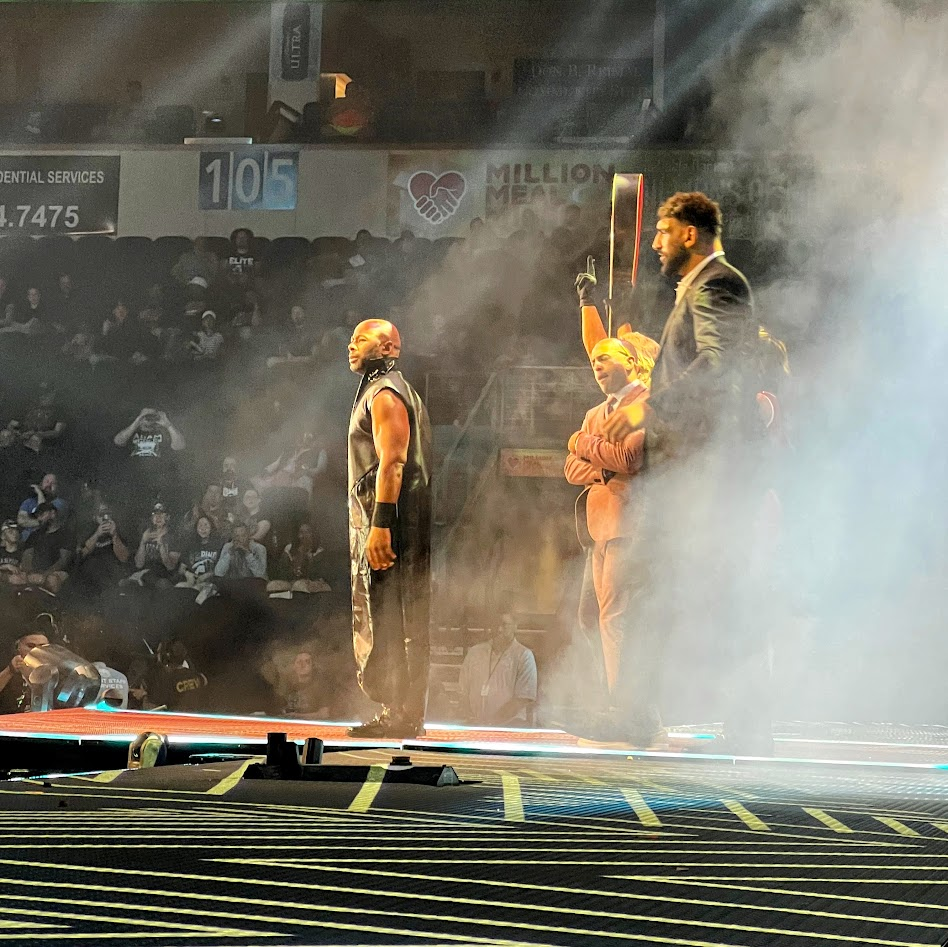
Dutt [center] alongside Jay Lethal and Satnam Singh

On June 30, 2021, it was reported that Dutt had signed with AEW as a producer. However, he later would also become a wrestling manager. On April 6, 2022, episode of AEW Dynamite, which took place five days after Dutt reunited with Jay Lethal at Ring of Honor's Supercard of Honor XV, Dutt would make his debut on AEW television, where he and Lethal appeared on-screen and promised Samoa Joe a present. The next week, Satnam Singh would attack Joe and align with Dutt and Lethal.

=== Ring of Honor (2021) ===
On April 1, 2022, Dutt appeared at Ring of Honor's Supercard of Honor XV, where he restrained Jay Lethal after Lethal attacked Matt Sydal. Dutt would turn heel later in the night, aligning with Lethal, and would afterwards begin a feud with Samoa Joe after Joe won the ROH Television Championship.

== Other media ==
Dutt was featured in the 2004 video game Backyard Wrestling 2: There Goes the Neighborhood and the 2008 video game TNA Impact!. He also did some of the motion capturing for Saints Row: The Third and WWE 2K18.

== Championships and accomplishments ==
- American Pro Wrestling Alliance
  - APWA World Junior Heavyweight Championship (1 time)
- Atomic Wrestling Entertainment
  - AWE Cruiserweight Championship (1 time)
- Combat Zone Wrestling
  - CZW World Junior Heavyweight Championship (2 times)
  - Best of the Best 4
  - CZW Hall of Fame (2019)
- Continental Wrestling Federation
  - CWF United States Championship (1 time)
- CyberSpace Wrestling Federation
  - CSWF Cruiser X Championship (1 time)
  - CSWF Tag Team Championship (2 times) – with Ruckus (1) and Prince Nana (1)
- Danger Zone Wrestling
  - DZW Tag Team Championship (1 time) – with Sean Lei
- GeneraXion Lucha Libre
  - GLL Hatun Auqui Championship (1 time)
- Global Force Wrestling
  - GFW NEX*GEN Championship (1 time)
- Global Wrestling Alliance
  - GWA Tag Team Championship (1 time) – with Sean Lei
- Ground Xero Wrestling
  - GXW Respect Championship (1 time)
- Independent Wrestling Association Mid-South
  - IWA Mid-South Light Heavyweight Championship (1 time)
- KYDA Pro Wrestling
  - KYDA Pro Mid-Atlantic Championship (2 time)
- Major League Wrestling
  - MLW Junior Heavyweight Championship (1 time, inaugural, final)
  - J-Cup USA (2003)
- NWA Impact
  - NWA Impact Junior Heavyweight Championship (1 time)
- Plymouth Championship Wrestling
  - PCW Heavyweight Championship (1 time)
- Primal Conflict Wrestling
  - PCW Tag Team Championship (1 time) - with Dirty Money
- Pro Wrestling Illustrated
  - Ranked No. 81 of the top 500 singles wrestlers in the PWI 500 in 2008
- Pro Wrestling Zero1
  - Zero1 International Junior Heavyweight Championship (1 time)
- Renegade Wrestling Alliance
  - RWA Cruiserweight Championship (2 times)
- Ring Ka King
  - World Cup of Ring Ka King (2012) – with Scott Steiner, Abyss, Deadly Danda, and Sir Brutus Magnus
- Total Nonstop Action Wrestling / Impact Wrestling
  - Impact X Division Championship (1 time)^{1}
  - World X Cup (2006) – with Alex Shelley, Chris Sabin, and Jay Lethal
  - Global Impact Tournament (2015) – with Team International (The Great Sanada, Drew Galloway, The Great Muta, Tigre Uno, Bram, Rockstar Spud, Khoya, Magnus and Angelina Love)
- UWA Hardcore Wrestling
  - Grand Prix Tournament (2006)
- Wrestling Observer Newsletter
  - Worst Worked Match of the Year (2006) TNA Reverse Battle Royal at TNA Impact!

^{1}During Dutt's Reign as champion the title was renamed the GFW X Division Championship.
