= MLW World Junior Heavyweight Championship =

Professional wrestling championship

Details
- Promotion: Major League Wrestling (MLW)
- Date established: September 19, 2003
- Date retired: February 10, 2004
Statistics
- First champion(s): Sonjay Dutt
- Final champion(s): Sonjay Dutt
- Most reigns: All titleholders (1)

The MLW World Junior Heavyweight Championship was a professional wrestling junior heavyweight championship owned by the Major League Wrestling (MLW) promotion. Only wrestlers under the junior heavyweight weight-limit may hold the championship. The weight-limit for the tag team title is 205 lb (93 kg); it is assumed that this title has the same weight-limit. It was proposed as part of a tournament called the J-Cup USA and Sonjay Dutt won the tournament and also was the last champion. Only one reign was crowned over its one-year existence.

== History ==
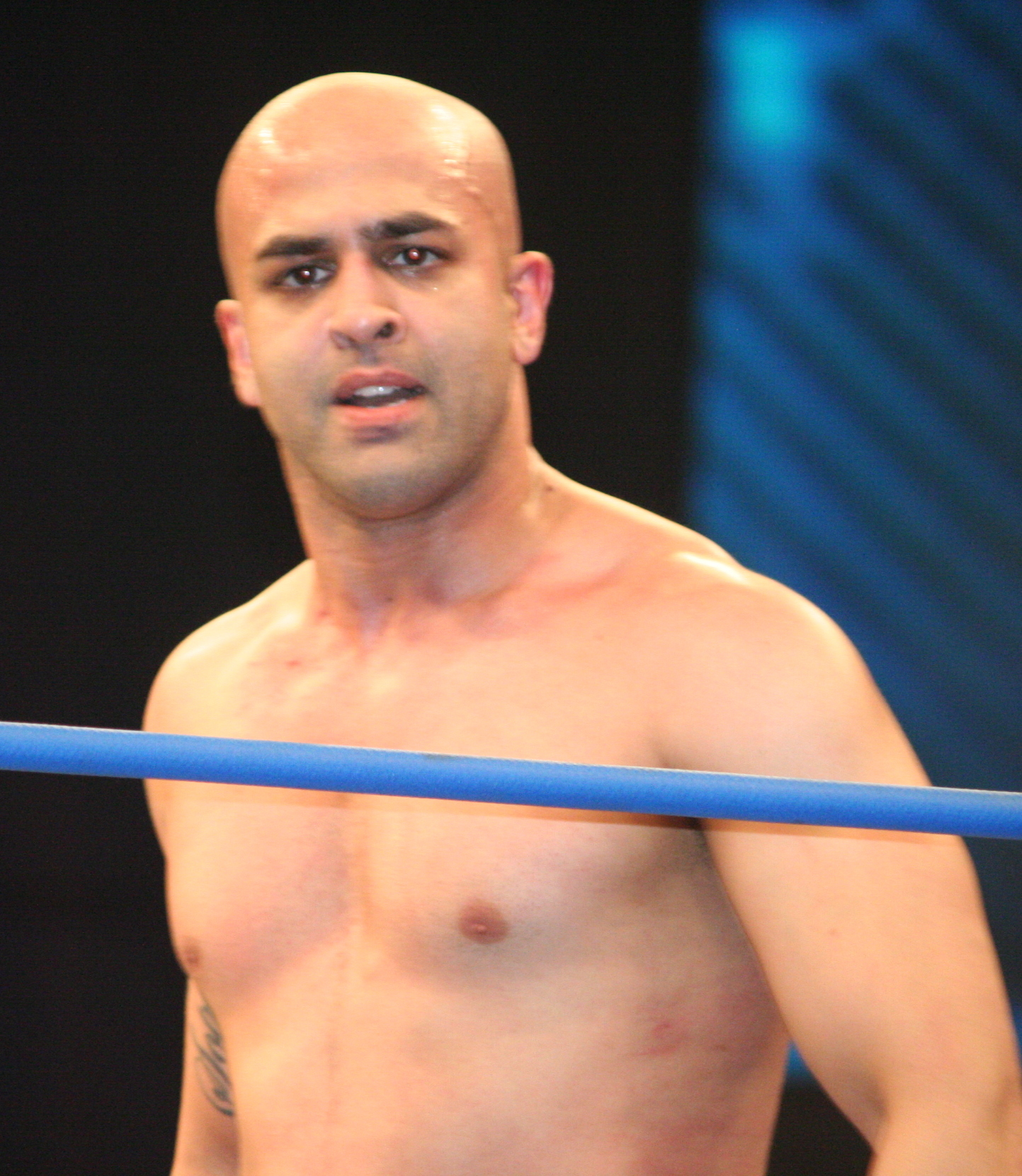
The Inaugural and Final champion Sonjay Dutt

The title was unveiled at WarGames on September 19, 2003, Major League Wrestling would start an eight-man single-elimination tournament named the J-Cup USA to crown the first champion. Sonjay Dutt, Eddie Colón, Jimmy Yang and Christopher Daniels would advance to the semifinals. Dutt and Daniels would defeat Cólon and Yang, respectively to advance to the finals. Dutt then defeated Daniels to win the J-Cup USA and become the inaugural champion. The matches of the tournament aired later on Underground TV tapings between September 29 and October 27.

=== Inaugural Championship tournament ===
Quarterfinals
Sonjay Dutt
Tony Mamaluke
Eddie Colón
Jerry Lynn
Jimmy Yang
Juventud Guerrera
Christopher Daniels
Super Dragon

Semifinals
Sonjay Dutt
Eddie Colón
Jimmy Yang
Christopher Daniels

Final
Sonjay Dutt
Christopher Daniels

== Reigns ==
Key
No.	Overall reign number
Reign	Reign number for the specific champion
Days	Number of days held

No.	Champion	Championship change			Reign statistics		Notes	Ref.
No.	Champion	Date	Event	Location	Reign	Days	Notes	Ref.
Major League Wrestling (MLW)
1	Sonjay Dutt	September 19, 2003	WarGames	Fort Lauderdale, FL	1	144	Defeated Christopher Daniels in a tournament final to become the inaugural champion.	
—	Deactivated	February 10, 2004	—	—	—	—	Sonjay Dutt was no longer listed as the MLW World Junior Heavyweight Champion after the company stopped hosting events.	
