= FTL War Memorial =

Multi-purpose indoor venue in Fort Lauderdale, Florida

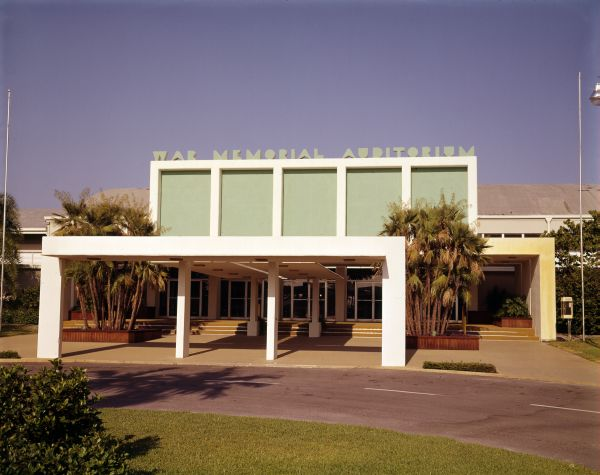
- Interactive map of FTL War Memorial
- Full name: FTL War Memorial
- Former names: War Memorial Auditorium (1950–2024)
- Address: 800 NE 8th Street; Fort Laudedale, FL
- Location: Fort Lauderdale, Florida, U.S.
- Coordinates: 26°8′0.7454″N 80°8′2.4875″W
- Capacity: 3,400
- Type: Multi-purpose arena Convention center
- Events: Concerts; Sporting events Ice Hockey; Ice Skating

Construction
- Opened: 1950
- Renovated: 1983, 2006, 2024
- Expanded: 2024

Tenant
- Florida Panthers (2024–present)

Website
- ftlwarmemorial.com

FTL War Memorial is a 3,400-seat multi-purpose arena, convention center, and ice hockey and skating complex in Fort Lauderdale, Florida, U.S.

The venue hosted professional wrestling cards from the Championship Wrestling from Florida promotion between 1951 and 1987. It was later home to television tapings for Ladies Major League Wrestling in 1990 and UWF Fury Hour in 1991.

It was also host to ECW Hardcore Heaven in 1997, MLW WarGames in 2003, ROH Showdown in the Sun in 2012, MLW WarGames in 2018, and NXT No Mercy in 2025.

The venue has hosted professional boxing cards since 1950, including the professional debut of Mickey Rourke in 1991.

== Baptist Health IcePlex ==
The Florida Panthers, who play at Amerant Bank Arena in nearby Sunrise, Florida, began leasing the venue in 2019 with plans to renovate it for community use. The renovation will be completed in two stages. Stage One was completed in early 2024 in which the Baptist Health IcePlex opened to the team and to the public. Stage Two will be completed in late 2024/early 2025 in which the concert venue will re-open.

=== Features ===
FTL War Memorial is now home to the Florida Panthers practice facility, known as the Baptist Health IcePlex.

- Two sheets of ice
  - Seat Geek Rink
  - Baptist Health Rink
- Locker Rooms and Skate Rentals
- The Federal
  - Full service restaurant and bar
- Pantherland powered by FLA Team Shop
  - Panthers team store and hockey pro shop
- Grab and Go concessions
- Florida Panther team offices, dressing rooms, rehabilitation facilities, and trailing rooms

=== Community Events ===
- Watch parties for Panthers playoff games
- Panthers Open Practices
- Open Public Skating
- Hockey Programs
- Learn to Skate Programs
- Figure Skating Programs
- Curling
- Corporate Events and Birthday Parties
