= Hart Still Beating =

- Poster for the film
- Hart Still Beating: Pro Wrestling Saved My Life - A Hart Family Documentary
- Directed by: Frederick Kroetsch and Kurt Spenrath
- Written by: Kurt Spenrath
- Screenplay by: Kurt Spenrath
- Story by: Documentary
- Based on: Hart family
- Produced by: Malcolm Oliver; Frederick Kroetsch; Kurt Spenrath
- Starring: Matthew Herweg; Smith Hart; Teddy Hart; Diana Smith-Hart; Harry Smith II; Ross Hart
- Narrated by: Matt Hart
- Cinematography: Frederick Kroetsch
- Edited by: Dean Davey
- Music by: Ian Armstrong
- Production companies: Telus Optik; Open Sky Pictures
- Distributed by: Telus
- Release dates: 31 August 2016 (Telus); 6 September 2016 (Web)
- Running time: 14 min
- Country: Canada
- Language: Canadian English

Hart Still Beating: Pro Wrestling Saved My Life - A Hart Family Documentary (often simply known as Hart Still Beating) is a 2016 Canadian short documentary directed by Kurt Spenrath and Frederick Kroetsch for Telus about professional wrestlers Matt and Smith Hart, father and son from the Hart family. The film concerns Matt's childhood from that of the death of his mother as well as Smith's terminal cancer diagnosis which leads to them growing closer to each other through professional wrestling after being near estranged for many years.

== Production and marketing ==
Director Kurt Spenrath had long been a fan of the Harts as a child since he grew up in Alberta where the family is near universally known. He began interacting with them after doing a project about Teddy Hart (Smith's nephew) that was put on hiatus for legal reasons which were later settled. Spenrath has explained that he spent a lot of time coming up with different "heart" related puns for the project but settled on "still beating" for fitting the theme that Matt Hart is continuing on with his life after the misfortune that befell on him. The film was intended by the filmmakers to follow in the footsteps of Hitman Hart: Wrestling with Shadows, the first documentary about Bret Hart (Smith's younger brother) which is one of the most acclaimed works about professional wrestling ever made. Much of the film was shot at Ranchman's Cookhouse and Dancehall in Calgary, where Matt wrestled regularly. Matt's stepmother, wrestling promoter Stacey Olaszak asked to not be mentioned in the film as she wished for it to focus only on Smith and Matt, despite this she did participate in the making of the film and received a special thanks in the credits. Spenrath has stated that he loved working on the story and that he hoped that it would be successful enough to get him the opportunity to make more similar films about the Canadian wrestling scene, he also expressed gratitude to Olaszak for lending her crew to welcome and help during the making of the film. Upon the films completion Spenrath promoted the film in various ways, including appearing on the Pro Wrestling Torch radio show. The film was announced to the public with an accompanying content summary in early August 2016 and the trailer was released shortly after. Promotional material for the film noted its focus on Matt and Smiths relationship as well as Smith's cancer diagnosis.

== Summary ==
The film begins with Matthew declaring his love of professional wrestling. It is followed by a montage of Matt wrestling in different matches while his father looks on, as Matt continues to explain his family's history in the industry, how it has shaped them and made them a unit. He concludes his monologue with stating that professional wrestling has saved his life. Matt explains further in the next scene that wrestling is an outlet for him that keeps him in the right state and helps him after his traumatic background. He and his cousin Harry Smith spend the scene demonstrating wrestling moves to young children and training them how to perform, Matt likes his situation to some of the children who come from less prosperous conditions and says that he hopes he can help them use wrestling to channel their feelings as well. Matt's aunt Diana narrates the next scene, continuing where Matt left of previously and expands on their family history, from her father Stu to her brothers Bret and Owen and to Matt generation. There is more footage of Matt, this time being trained himself by his father as his Smith explains more elements of the industry. As Matt and Smith continue to train there are spliced in interview segments of them discussing their relationship. This is followed by an interview with Teddy Hart (Edward Annis), Matt's oldest cousin in the wrestling business who says he finds it heartening to see his uncle train his own son as the other third generation members of the family were taught by their uncles. After some more conversations with various family members it is revealed that Smith has been diagnosed with cancer. Smith's brother Ross and their nephew Harry both express their hopes that Smith can recover in time. Matt also expresses this, going on to explain that his mother is already gone, so he does not know how to deal with both his parents potentially being dead soon. The film shows a flashback with a young actor portraying a 13 year old Matt finding his mother dead on her bed. He speaks about how it was his 13th birthday and he and his mother had planned to spend the day together having fun but that when he arrived to the house she had passed out and been found by another person already dead. Diana explains that this led to Matt being placed in foster care as the authorities did not deem his father a stable enough security to the boy at that time. Matt explains how he was separated from his family and his only way to keep contact with his past was watching wrestling videos on YouTube at a friends house, wishing that he would find his way back and reclaim his dream of stepping into the ring himself. He talks about addiction and how he exchanged harmful addictions to constructive ones, such as training and performing wrestling. He says that it's those things that keeps one alive in his situation. The film continues on showing more family interactions, most with Matts older half-sister Tania and their father. The next scene shows Matt suiting up in his wrestling gear to have a match for his family's promotion while Teddy talks about how proud he thinks Smith must be to see his son continue on the family tradition. Both Teddy and another family member Bronwyne Billington express how they wish they could have had their fathers (B. J. Annis and Dynamite Kid respectively) be there for their first matches, like Matt has. The film ends with everyone expressing their happiness for professional wrestling helping to bring their family back together again.

== Release and reception ==
The film aired on August 31, 2016, and was released on video on demand in September. The VOD debut was followed by an issued press release about the film. Andre Corbeil of The Brand stated that even big Hart family fans would learn something from the documentary. Former WWE producer and wrestling reporter Randy Helms expressed that the documentary was very good in his opinion and that it gave him a newfound understanding of what some of the Harts have gone through in their lives, inside and outside of the wrestling business. Nick Hausman of WrestleZone said that it was good but very short. He likened the story of Matt being taken away from his father to that of Harry Potter, where a young boy with special talents is bereaved of the opportunity to use them until he is reunited with the world he lost, but instead of a world with literal magic it's the fantastical heightened world of professional wrestling. Isabel Rodriguez of SocialSuplex enjoyed the film feeling that its focus on the younger Hart over anything else was a good choice as it was the most engaging subject. Rodriguez did feel the film was short as well as lacking in some context in parts and she wondered if there was some material cut. She concluded that it was "a very enjoyable film that leaves the viewers with a greater understanding of the wrestler known as Matt Hart".

== See also ==
- Bret "Hit Man" Hart: The Best There Is, the Best There Was, the Best There Ever Will Be
- Bret Hart: Survival of the Hitman
