= Kurt Spenrath =

Canadian filmmaker

- Born: Edmonton, Alberta, Canada
- Occupation: Filmmaker
- Employer: Open Sky Pictures
- Known for: Documentary films

Kurt Spenrath is a Canadian award-winning filmmaker from Edmonton, Alberta. He is best known for his work on documentaries, as both a producer and director.

== Career ==
Spenrath and his frequent collaborator Frederick Kroetsch have together created the company Open Sky Pictures which produces documentaries. Spenrath has pursued several projects about controversial professional wrestler Teddy Hart of the Hart family, he at first filmed a reality television series about Hart named Hart Attack which never ended up airing due to complications regarding Hart. Later he has attempted to film a documentary named Hart of Darkness which also ended up in limbo due to Hart's legal troubles in 2014. As of the 2018 the film is in post production. While the projects have not come to full fruition Spenrath did gain many connects in the professional wrestling industry due to his work on them, which lead him to making the documentaries The Match about the Prairie Wrestling Alliance and Hart Still Beating which is about Teddy Hart's cousin Matt.

Spenrath has also produced plays.

== Personal life ==
Spenrath is a cat lover.

== Awards and nominations ==
Year	Association	Category	Nominated work	Result	Ref.
2014	Alberta Film and Television Awards	Best Documentary Under 30 Minutes	Hart Attack (television pilot)	Nominated	
2014	Edmonton International Film Festival	Alberta Short Film Award (Documentary)	Through Ice and Time	Won	
2015	Hot Docs Canadian International Documentary Festival	Prizes for Best Pitch	Hart of Darkness	Won (Note: Bronze)	
2015	Alberta Film and Television Awards	Best Documentary Series	Invincible	Nominated	
2015	Yorkton Film Festival	Emerging Filmmaker	The Match	Won	
2015	Alberta Film and Television Awards	Best Director (Non-Fiction Under 30 Minutes)	The Match	Nominated	
2017	Alberta Film and Television Awards	Best Documentary Under 30 Minutes	Beneath the Surface	Nominated	
2018	Alberta Film and Television Awards	Best Production Reflecting Cultural Diversity	Last of the Fur Traders	Won	
