= Mike Ross (announcer) =

Canadian announcer, actor and broadcaster (born 1973)

- Born: September 8, 1973 (age 52); Ottawa, Ontario, Canada
- Occupations: Broadcaster, arena announcer, actor
- Known for: Toronto Maple Leafs PA announcer (2016–present), NHL Network Radio morning host (2009–2015)

Mike Ross (born September 8, 1973) is a Canadian announcer, broadcaster and actor. He has been the PA announcer for the Toronto Maple Leafs since 2016 and is also a presenter on AMI-audio.

== Education and starting in radio ==
Ross graduated from the École secondaire publique De La Salle in Ottawa and went on to study at Carleton University and volunteered at CKCU, Carleton's campus radio station, where he first did sports on the radio.

Soon after, he began working in the promotions department at Rawlco's Energy 1200 and Majic 100 in Ottawa.

== Sports radio career ==
In 1998, 1200 AM went all sports and Ross became the morning show producer and co-host on OSR 1200.

In 1999, when CHUM Limited bought Rawlco's Ottawa stations, he was moved to the afternoon drive show with Duke and the Dandyman.

In 2001, CHUM launched a national sports radio network, The Team and hired him to produce the afternoon drive show from Toronto as well as serve as a general sports reporter covering the NHL, CFL, NBA and Major League Baseball.

In 2002, when CHUM pulled out of the national sports radio project, Ross moved over to television as an associate producer for Rogers Sportsnet.

Ross joined XM Canada's "Home Ice" hockey channel when it launched in 2005 (renamed Sirius XM NHL Network Radio in 2013), as the producer of the midday show with Jim Tatti and Gary Green. Soon thereafter, Ross became the show's back-up host and co-host who filled in for Tatti or Green.

In 2008, Ross became co-host of the main afternoon show, In the Slot with Phil Esposito.

From 2009 until 2015, Ross hosted Hockey This Morning along with Peter Berce and Shawn Lavigne. The show was heard weekdays from 7am to 11am.

As part of a restructuring of SiriusXM Satellite Radio's NHL Network Radio channel lineup, Ross was let go on October 5, 2015 and replaced by Stellick & Simmer hosted by Gord Stellick and Rob Simpson.

== Public Address announcer ==
In February 2010, Ross was the guest PA announcer for the Ottawa Senators. Earlier in his career, he was also the stadium announcer for the Ottawa Lynx and the arena announcer for the Ottawa 67's. He was also the PA announcer for the 2015 World Junior Hockey Championships at the Air Canada Centre.

In 2017, Ross was a public address announcer at the Invictus Games in Toronto.

Ross became the fourth public address announcer in the history of the Toronto Maple Leafs, beginning with the 2016-2017 season.

== AMI ==
From February 2016 until late 2019 Ross hosted Live From Studio 5, a current affairs morning show on AMI-audio, the audio channel of Accessible Media Inc. (AMI). The show was simulcast on AMI-tv beginning in the fall of 2018. Ross moved behind the scenes to become AMI's news director in December 2019. He continued to host as anchor of The Gazette, a daily news show and reading service for blind and vision impaired listeners on AMI-audio, until August 2021. From September 2021 to August 2024 he was co-host of AMI-audio's The Globe and Mail Today. He presented The Washington Post This Week, reading articles from the newspaper from 2024 to 2025. For the 2025-26 broadcast season, Ross presented The Guardian Daily.

== Acting and voice over work ==
Since 2021, Ross has landed roles on television and feature film and some voice acting roles as well. He has appeared on shows like Hotel Paranormal (2021), See No Evil (2021) and A Time To Kill (2021), along with the Gail Maurice-directed feature film Rosie (2022) and the award-winning web-series Creepy Bits (2021), for which he was nominated for two best actor awards at web festivals in New Zealand and Baltimore. He has also had voice over roles in the virtual experience "Spacewalk", along with commercials for Tim Hortons and Clearscore.ca.
