= Frederick Kroetsch =

Canadian director, cinematographer

- Education: Mel Hoppenheim School of Cinema, Concordia University
- Known for: Filmmaker

Frederick Kroetsch is a Canadian director, producer and cinematographer. He is known for Dangerous Breed: Crime. Cons. Cats. which premiered on Peacock in November 2022.

== Biography and work ==
Kroetsch graduated with a film production degree from the Mel Hoppenheim School of Cinema at Concordia University. He is based in Edmonton.

Kroetsch has worked with broadcasters including: Peacock, CBC, AMI-tv, APTN, Bravo, and Cottage Life as a TV Producer/Host for ShawTV, HelpTV, and CTV 2 for ten years. He has directed 2 seasons of Dr. Savanna: Wild Rose Vet, and ran a unit on History's The Curse of Oak Island.

Kroetsch created and directed Queen of the Oil Patch, a documentary series about two-spirited singer Massey Whiteknife. He also created the web-series Happy Town about his Cousin Jay, who builds things that nobody wants.

Kroetsch was cinematographer on the inaugural season of Anaana's Tent, filmed in Iqaluit. He is also cinematographer and Executive Producer on Wochiigii lo: End of the Peace, which premiered at the Toronto International Film Festival.

Kroetsch is also the cinematographer and Executive Producer on The Secret Society, a feature-length documentary about the world of egg donation, directed by his wife Rebecca Campbell.

In November 2022, Kroetsch created a three-part true crime docuseries Dangerous Breed: Crime. Cons. Cats. about wrestler Teddy Hart, It was produced by Blumhouse Productions and premiered on Peacock.

== Selected filmography ==
- Queen of the Oil Patch (2018)
- Blind Ambition: The Wop May Story (2021)
- Dangerous Breed: Crime. Cons. Cats (2022), produced by Blumhouse Productions
- Dr. Savanna: Wild Rose Vet

== Awards and nominations ==
Year	Association	Category	Nominated work	Result	Ref.
2022	Alberta Film and Television Awards	Best Screenwriter (Non-Fiction Under 30 Minutes)	Dr. Savannah: Wild Rose Vet	Won	
2022	Alberta Film and Television Awards	Best Cinematography (Non-Fiction Over 30 Minutes)	Wochiigii lo: End of the Peace	Nominated	
2022	Edmonton Short Film Festival	Best Canadian	Blind Ambition: The Wop May Story	Won	
2022	FAVA Fest	Outstanding Short Documentary	Blind Ambition: The Wop May Story	Won	
2022	Central Alberta Film Festival	Best Short Documentary	Blind Ambition: The Wop May Story	Won	
2021	Alberta Film and Television Awards	Best Screenwriter (Unscripted Under 30 Minutes)	Queen of the Oil Patch	Won	
2021	Alberta Film and Television Awards	Best Cinematography (Unscripted Under 30 Minutes)	The Secret Society	Nominated	
2021	Edmonton International Film Festival	Best Short Documentary	Blind Ambition: The Wop May Story	Won	
2021	Edmonton International Film Festival	Audience Choice	Blind Ambition: The Wop May Story	Won	
2021	Edmonton Artists' Trust Fund Awards	Edmonton Artists' Trust Annual Winner		Won	
2019	Alberta Film and Television Awards	Best Screenwriter (Non-Fiction Under 30 Minutes)	Queen of the Oil Patch	Won	
2019	Alberta Film and Television Awards	Best Director (Non Fiction Under 30)	Queen of the Oil Patch	Nominated	
2019	Alberta Film and Television Awards	Best Children's Program or Series	The Girl Who Talks to the Moon	Nominated	
2018	Alberta Film and Television Awards	Best Production Reflecting Cultural Diversity	Last of the Fur Traders	Won	
2016	Bucharest ShortCut Cinefest	Best Documentary	Beneath the Surface	Won	
2015	Plymouth Film Festival, UK	Best Documentary	The Match	Won	
2015	Avenue Magazine	Top 40 Under 40		Won	
