= École secondaire publique De La Salle =

Location
- 501 Old St-Patrick Street; Ottawa, Ontario, K1N 8R3; Canada; 45.434887°N 75.684847°W

Information
- School type: Public
- Founded: 1971
- School board: CÉPEO
- School number: 907430
- Principal: Carole Myre
- Grades: 7–12
- Language: French
- Area: Downtown Ottawa/Lowertown
- Colours: Burgundy and Silver
- Mascot: Cavalier
- Team name: Les Cavaliers
- Website: www.de-la-salle.cepeo.on.ca

École secondaire publique De La Salle is a French public junior high and high school in Lowertown Ottawa, Ontario under the CÉPEO (Conseil des Écoles Publiques de l'Est de l'Ontario). It is recognized mainly for its artistic excellence program: the Centre d'Excellence Artistique de l'Ontario (CEAO).

== History ==
École secondaire publique De La Salle opened in the fall of 1971 with students from Mont St-Joseph convent, Rideau Street convent and Académie De La Salle. Just like Académie De La Salle, École secondaire publique De La Salle was named after Saint Jean-Baptiste de la Salle.

In 1982, a study committee recommended the creation of an enrichment centre in Ottawa for gifted students. The committee also recommended that this centre be created and integrated at École secondaire publique De La Salle.

In 1983, De La Salle opened le Centre de Douance (a program for gifted students) and le Centre d'Excellence Artistique de l'Ontario (an arts specialization program). De La Salle became the first school in Ontario to offer those programs in French.

In 2003, De La Salle opened its doors to Grades 7–8. Most of the second floor of the school is exclusively for Grades 7–8, except for one hallway which is reserved for the music concentration and the auditorium, whose main access point is on the second floor.

In 2021, De La Salle invested in a new wing with 8 new classrooms, 2 dance studios a gym, and a weightlifting room. Construction was completed in 2022.

== Centre d'excellence artistique de l'Ontario ==
The Centre d'excellence artistique de l'Ontario (CEAO) includes 8 arts concentrations from Grade 8 to Grade 12, and a pre-concentration program in Grade 7 to prepare students for the arts concentrations. With rigorous training to become professional artists, the school was ranked 138th in Ontario in 2023 by the Fraser Institute. These concentrations make the school a magnet arts school similar to Canterbury, with the exception of offering French as their main language. The concentrations offered are:

- Media & Visual Arts
- Dance (Ballet & Contemporary)
- Writing & Literature
- Theatre
- Music – Wind & Percussion
- Music – Strings
- Music – Vocal
- Cinema & Television

The Centre d'excellence artistique's concentration programs have received numerous awards and won many competitions. Every year the vocal ensemble Harmonie De La Salle participates in the Kiwanis Music Festival where it won gold every year since 2009. Most recently, the Senior Vocal Music class won first place at the 16th National Vocal Music Contest hosted by the CBC/Radio-Canada.

== Notable students ==
- Dan Boyle – defenceman for the New York Rangers NHL hockey team (2008–2016)
- Steffi DiDomenicantonio – Canadian Idol participant, season 2006
- Nicolas Dromard – Singer/dancer/actor who's performed in Toronto, at the Stratford festival of Canada, in national US tours and on Broadway.
- Denis Forest – Film and TV actor
- Mike Ross – Public Address Announcer – Toronto Maple Leafs – actor TV, film, voice – host – AMI-audio, former host and producer NHL Home Ice, XM Satellite Radio
- Patrick Leonard – Olympic Athlete – Ice Dancing (Socci 2014) – Former dancer at Russia's National Ballet

== See also ==
- Education in Ontario
- List of secondary schools in Ontario
