= Voiceprint =

Voiceprint can refer to the spectrogram of a voice. More specific uses include:

- VoicePrint, as of March 2012 now AMI-audio, Canada's broadcast reading service
- Voiceprint Records, an English record label
- The stored template used to identify a person via their voice in speaker recognition
