= Voice print =

Voice print may refer to:

- VoicePrint, a Canadian audio-only TV network
- Spectrogram, an image representing the sounds in a voice
- Voice print, a verification method of speaker recognition
- Voiceprint Records, an English record label
