= Trent Beretta =

American professional wrestler (born 1987)

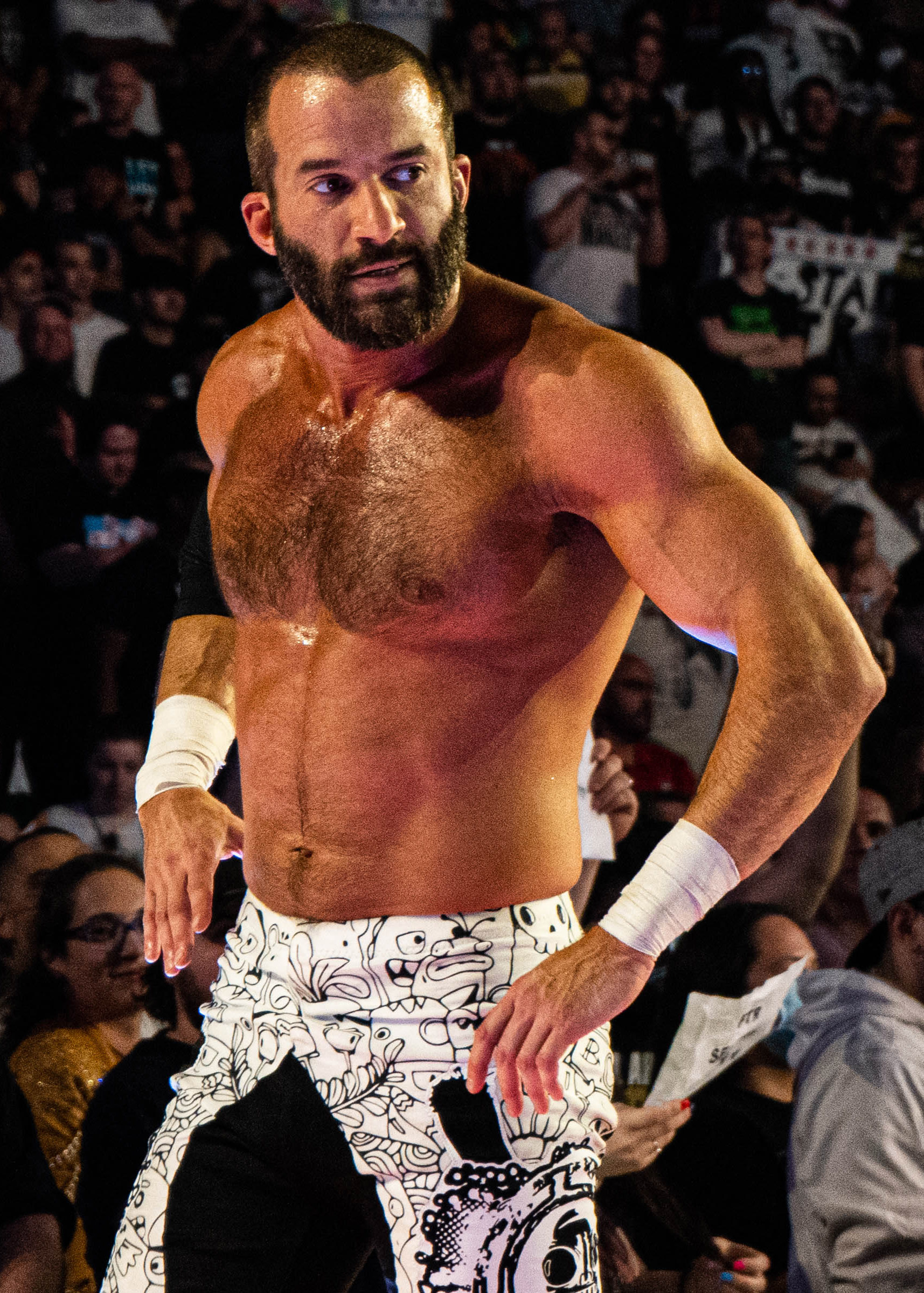
- Beretta in 2022

Personal information
- Born: Gregory Marasciulo; March 30, 1987 (age 39) Mount Sinai, New York, U.S.

Professional wrestling career
- Ring name(s): Ace Vedder; Beretta; The Girl from Mexico; Greg Cardona; Greg Jackson; Greg Marasciulo plaZma; Trent; Trent? Trent Barreta; Trent Beretta; Trent? Beretta
- Billed height: 6 ft 0 in (183 cm)
- Billed weight: 215 lb (98 kg)
- Billed from: Long Island, New York
- Trained by: Florida Championship Wrestling; Mikey Whipwreck; New York Wrestling Connection
- Debut: July 10, 2004

Gregory Marasciulo (born March 30, 1987), better known by the ring name Trent Beretta, is an American professional wrestler. He is signed to All Elite Wrestling (AEW), where he is a member of the Don Callis Family and one-half of RPG Vice with Rocky Romero. He is also known for his tenures in WWE, New Japan Pro-Wrestling (NJPW) and Ring of Honor (ROH). As part of Roppongi Vice, Beretta is a former four-time IWGP Junior Heavyweight Tag Team Champion.

Marasciulo began his professional wrestling career at New York Wrestling Connection in 2004 before signing to World Wrestling Entertainment (WWE). He worked in WWE's developmental territory Florida Championship Wrestling before debuting on WWE's main roster in 2009. Marasciulo wrestled as one half of the Dude Busters with Caylen Croft before he began wrestling as a lower-card singles competitor and was released from his WWE contract in 2013. After his release from WWE, Marasciulo started wrestling in promotions including Total Nonstop Action Wrestling, Pro Wrestling Guerilla, and Ring of Honor.

== Professional wrestling career ==
=== New York Wrestling Connection (2004–2007, 2017) ===
Marasciulo made his professional debut for New York Wrestling Connection on July 10, 2004, under the ring name Plazma in a losing effort to Dan Barry. After wrestling primarily in singles and tag team matches, Plazma defeated Matt Maverick on January 28, 2006, to become the promotion's first ever Hi-Fi Champion, which was also the first championship of his career. On February 25, Plazma retained the title against Maverick in his first title defense. On March 18, Plazma lost the title to Mike Spinelli. Plazma would defeat Spinelli in a rematch for the title on May 20. After successfully retaining the title against the likes of Jamie Van Lemer, Spyder, Javi-Air, and Jerry Lynn throughout the next few months, Plazma lost the Hi-Fi Championship to Dickie Rodz on October 21. After two unsuccessful attempts to regain the title in February and March 2007, respectively, Plazma teamed with Maverick to defeat The Angus Brothers (Danny and Billy) and Dan Dynasty and Jamie Van Lemer in a three-way match to win the Tag Team Championship. The team would retain the title on several occasions before losing them to MEGA and Prince Nana on December 15. That same night, Plazma defeated Quiet Storm to win the NYWC Heavyweight Championship, although the title was vacated shortly afterwards due to Marasciulo announcing his signing to World Wrestling Entertainment (WWE).

On May 20, 2017, Marasciulo was inducted into the NYWC Hall of Fame as Trent Barreta and competed in an eight-man tag team match at Master of the Mat.

=== World Wrestling Entertainment / WWE (2007-2013) ===
==== Florida Championship Wrestling (2007–2009) ====
Between August 2007 and January 2008, Marasciulo had several tryout matches for WWE, using the ring name Greg Cardona. He was signed to a WWE contract and began wrestling in Florida Championship Wrestling (FCW) under the ring name Greg Jackson. His name was later changed to Trent Barreta, then tweaked to Trent Beretta. He also competed under a mask as The Girl From Mexico in an attempt to become the first Queen of FCW, but was eliminated in the second round by Angela Fong. Beretta would soon form a tag team with Caylen Croft called the "Dude Busters". Together, they would defeat Tyler Reks on May 30, 2009, to win the FCW Florida Tag Team Championship after Reks' tag team partner, Johnny Curtis, failed to appear. On July 23, Barreta and Croft lost the title to Justin Angel and Kris Logan. The Dude Busters reclaimed the title when Croft and Curt Hawkins, their new ally, defeated the Rotundos (Bo and Duke) on November 19. Barreta was officially recognized as a champion alongside Croft and Hawkins, and was allowed to defend the title alongside either Croft or Hawkins via the Freebird Rule. On January 14, 2010, at an FCW television taping, the Dude Busters lost the Florida Tag Team Championship to The Fortunate Sons (Brett DiBiase and Joe Hennig).

==== Dude Busters (2009–2010) ====
On the December 1, 2009, episode of ECW on Syfy, Marasciulo, under the respelled name of Trent Barreta, and Caylen Croft debuted as villains, squashing a tag team. The duo would then feud with Goldust and Yoshi Tatsu, which culminated in a loss to Goldust and Tatsu in a match to determine the number one contenders to the Unified WWE Tag Team Championship on the February 9, 2010, episode of ECW. When the ECW brand ended in February 2010, its roster became free agents. Barreta and Croft signed with SmackDown, making their debut for the brand on February 19 in a losing effort against Cryme Tyme. Barreta and Croft would then feud with The Hart Dynasty, but could never manage a win against them. In April, they began using their Dude Busters name again, which they had seemingly dropped since debuting in ECW. The Dude Busters then turned into fan favorites when they entered into a feud with the Gatecrashers (Curt Hawkins and Vance Archer) in August. The Dude Busters then earned their first tag team victory since joining the SmackDown roster when they defeated the Gatecrashers on the August 26 episode of Superstars.

==== SmackDown; NXT (2010–2013) ====
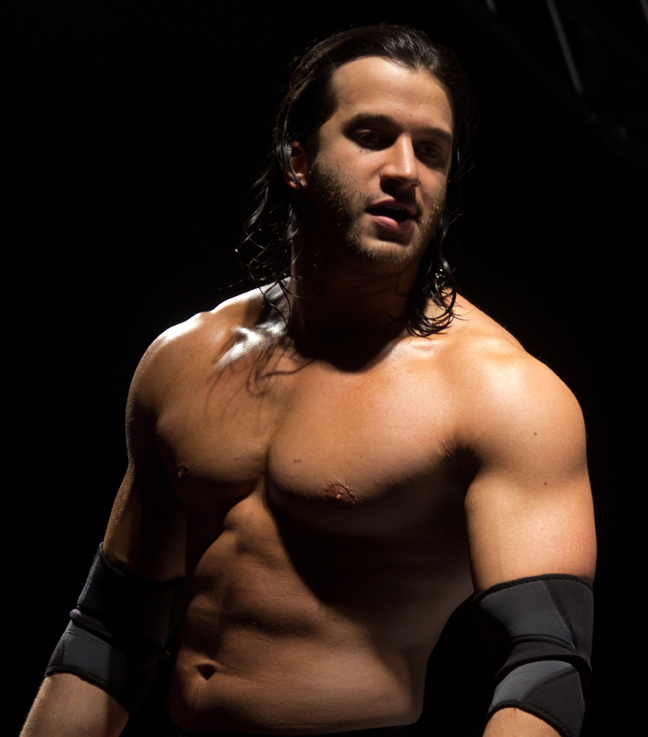
Barreta in 2012

On November 19, 2010, Caylen Croft was released from his contract, effectively ending the Dude Busters and turning Barreta into a singles competitor. After becoming a singles competitor, Barreta would largely be involved in lower-card feuds. During this period, a majority of his matches would be on Superstars, and when he appeared on SmackDown, he would almost always lose, only garnering a single win when appearing on SmackDown during his tenure in WWE. Barreta would continue to feud with Hawkins, whose partner Archer had also been released together with Croft. Both wrestlers would exchange wins in various matches on Superstars. Barreta would then feud with Drew McIntyre, even managing to earn an upset victory over McIntyre on the January 14, 2011, episode of SmackDown, his first singles win on the SmackDown brand since the breakup of the Dude Busters.

In 2011, Barreta would largely be used as enhancement talent, mostly competing on Superstars and losing to various wrestlers such as Cody Rhodes, Jack Swagger, Tyler Reks, Ted DiBiase, Wade Barrett, Heath Slater, and Jinder Mahal. From April, Barreta would enter into a long rivalry with Tyson Kidd, but he found himself on the losing end in five singles matches against Kidd. However, Barreta managed a win over Kidd when he teamed with The Usos to beat Kidd, Justin Gabriel, and Heath Slater on the June 30, 2011, episode of Superstars. Barreta finally defeated Kidd in a singles match on the August 23 episode of NXT, his first match on NXT.

In 2012, Barreta would exclusively wrestle on NXT, failing to wrestle on Raw or SmackDown. On NXT, Barreta formed an alliance with Yoshi Tatsu from December 2011, they feuded with Curt Hawkins and Tyler Reks; both teams managed to score one win apiece during the feud. Both teams would play pranks on each other, with Tatsu being locked in a closet and Reks' hands being superglued onto a video game controller. During this feud, Barreta would score rare singles wins over both Hawkins and Reks on consecutive episodes of NXT in January 2012. The feud ended when Hawkins and Reks defeated Barreta and Tatsu on the January 18 episode of NXT. Barreta disappeared from television after February 2012 due to a torn triceps, instead being confined to the "Where's Trent?" segments within the Z! True Long Island Story YouTube show. A video package on the September 12 episode of NXT acknowledged Barreta's six-month absence and the "Where's Trent" segments, scheduling his return on the September 19 episode of NXT, where he defeated Johnny Curtis. After trading wins with Kassius Ohno, Barreta was injured by Leo Kruger before the third match in the series. On January 11, 2013, Marasciulo was released from his WWE contract; with his last televised match for WWE being a disqualification win over Kruger due to Ohno's interference on the January 16, 2013, episode of NXT, which was taped before his release.

=== Independent circuit (2013–2019) ===
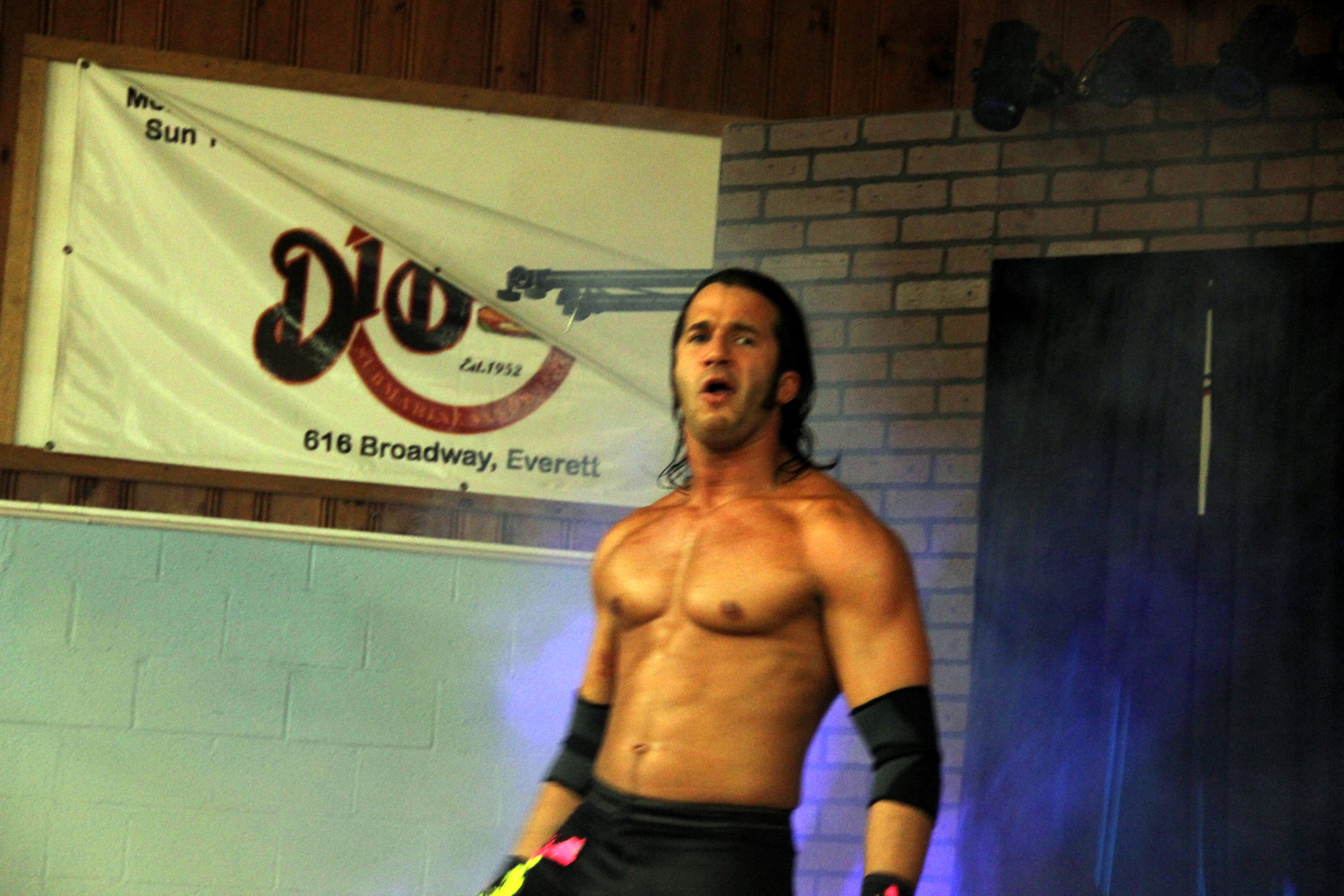
Barreta in 2013

On January 18, 2013, Marasciulo made his first independent appearance since his WWE release, when he worked for the Hart Legacy Wrestling promotion in Calgary, Alberta, Canada. In the opening four-way elimination tag team match, Marasciulo, still working as Trent Barreta, teamed with Brian Cage, with the two being eliminated by El Generico and Samuray del Sol. Later in the main event of the evening, Barreta teamed with Davey Boy Smith Jr., El Generico, Jack Evans and Samuray del Sol in a ten-man tag team match, where they were defeated by Teddy Hart, Brian Cage, Cam!kaze, Flip Kendrick and Pete Wilson. On April 6, 2013, Trent? made his debut for Dragon Gate USA, defeating Jon Davis via disqualification. On April 26, Barreta made his debut for Full Impact Pro, defeating A. R. Fox. On July 5, 2013, Barreta made his return for Full Impact Pro (FIP) at Declaration of Independence, where he defeated the FIP World Heavyweight Champion Jon Davis by disqualification. On August 9, Barreta defeated Davis in a rematch to become the new FIP World Heavyweight Champion.

On October 12, 2013, Trent made his debut in Family Wrestling Entertainment (FWE) with Bandido Jr. in a match for the FWE Tag Team Championship. However, the champions retained. On December 6, Barreta successfully defended the FIP World Heavyweight Championship against Lince Dorado.

On February 22, Barreta unsuccessfully challenged Johnny Gargano for the Open the Freedom Gate Championship. In March 2014, Trent? took part in German promotion Westside Xtreme Wrestling's 16 Carat Gold weekend. During the second day on March 15, he and Matt Striker defeated Hot & Spicy (Axel Dieter Jr. and Da Mack) to win the wXw World Tag Team Championship. They, however, lost the title back to Hot & Spicy the next day.

On November 14, 2014, during WWNLive's tour of China, Barreta lost the FIP World Heavyweight Championship to Rich Swann.

On May 13, 2015, Global Force Wrestling (GFW) announced Barreta as part of their roster. He made his debut for the promotion at GFW's first-ever event on June 12, where he and Chuck Taylor were defeated by the Tate twins (Brandon and Brent).

On June 24, 2017, Beretta and Rocky Romero, as Roppongi Vice, defeated Guerrillas of Destiny (Tama Tonga and Tanga Loa) at WrestleCircus' Dive Hard with a Vengeance to win the WrestleCircus Big Top Tag Team Championship.

=== New Japan Pro-Wrestling (2013) ===
On May 3, 2013, New Japan Pro-Wrestling (NJPW) announced Marasciulo, working simply as Beretta, as a participant in the 2013 Best of the Super Juniors tournament. Beretta made his debut for the promotion on May 22, teaming with Titán in a tag team match, where they defeated Bushi and Hiromu Takahashi. In the round-robin portion of the tournament itself, which ran from May 24 to June 6, Beretta won three of his eight matches, finishing seventh out of the nine wrestlers in his block.

On October 15, NJPW announced that Beretta, now representing the Chaos stable, would return to the promotion on October 25, teaming with Brian Kendrick in the 2013 Super Jr. Tag Tournament. Beretta and Kendrick were eliminated from the tournament in the first round by The Young Bucks, following a pre-match assault by Bullet Club. Beretta teamed with various Chaos stablemates in midcard six-man and eight-man tag team matches for the rest of the tour, which lasted until November 6.

=== Pro Wrestling Guerrilla (2013–2019) ===
Marasciulo, working under the ring name Trent?, made his PWG debut at All Star Weekend 9, losing to Roderick Strong. He then made his return to PWG in the 2013 Battle of Los Angeles, losing in the first round to Kyle O'Reilly. On the second night of BOLA, he picked up his first win with Chuck Taylor and Joey Ryan as the "Best Friends", defeating Willie Mack, B-Boy and Tommaso Ciampa in a six-man tag team match. On January 31, Trent? and Taylor defeated three other teams, including the Inner City Machine Guns (Rich Swann and Ricochet) in the finals, to win PWG's 2014 Dynamite Duumvirate Tag Team Title Tournament (DDT4). As a result of winning the 2014 DDT4, Trent? and Chuck Taylor received a shot at the PWG World Tag Team Championship on March 28, but were defeated by the defending champions, The Young Bucks (Matt and Nick Jackson). In March 2016 during PWG's All Star Weekend 12, Trent? picked up his first singles win against Drew Galloway, then he defeated Adam Cole the following night. At PWG Thirteen, Barreta was defeated by his tag team partner Chuck Taylor. On Mystery Vortex IV, Barreta defeated Candice LeRae. In 2016 at Only Kings Understand Each Other, Barreta defeated Fenix. At Nice Boys (Don't Play Rock N Roll), Best Friends defeated Leaders Of The New School(Marty Scurll and Zack Sabre Jr.) when Barreta pinned PWG World Champion Sabre Jr., who along with Scurll attacked them after the match. This led to a championship match at Head Like A Cole where Barreta was unsuccessful. At Man On The Silver Mountain, Barreta was defeated by Jeff Cobb. At Mystery Vortex V, Barreta defeated Marty Scurll. At Neon Knights, Barreta challenge his tag team partner Chuck Taylor for the PWG World Championship, during the match Taylor hit Barreta with the championship and low blowed him while the referee had not seen him to win the match.

=== Total Nonstop Action Wrestling (2013, 2014) ===
On July 18, Marasciulo, working under his real name, made his debut for Total Nonstop Action Wrestling (TNA), when he took part in the Destination X episode of Impact Wrestling. Entering a tournament to determine the new X Division Champion, he defeated Rockstar Spud and Rubix in his first round three-way match to advance to the tournament finals. On the July 25 episode of Impact Wrestling, he was defeated by Manik in an Ultimate X match that also included Sonjay Dutt for the X Division Championship. On April 12, 2014, Marasciulo returned to TNA under the ring name Ace Vedder at TNA One Night Only's event X-Travaganza 2 defeating Manik in a singles match to qualify for the Ultimate X match later that night. In the main event Low Ki defeated Rashad Cameron, Kenny King, Ace Vedder, Sonjay Dutt and Tigre Uno in the Ultimate X match for a future shot at the TNA X Division Championship.

=== New Japan Pro-Wrestling (2015-2017) ===
==== Roppongi Vice (2015–2017) ====
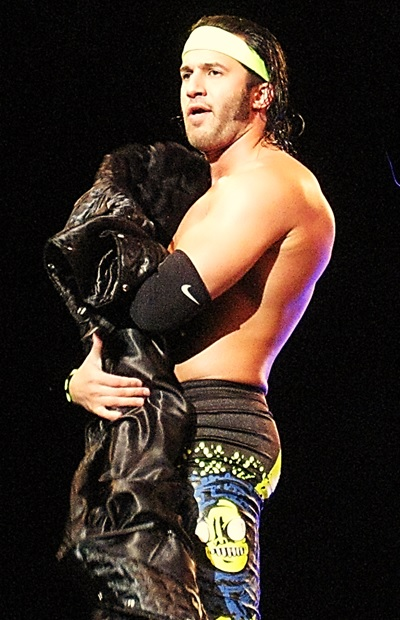
Beretta in a New Japan Pro-Wrestling ring in March 2015

On March 16, 2015, NJPW announced that Beretta would be returning to the promotion later that month as part of the Roppongi Vice tag team with Rocky Romero. His return match took place on March 22, when he teamed with Romero and Chaos stablemate Gedo to defeat Bullet Club (Kenny Omega, Matt Jackson and Nick Jackson) in a six-man tag team match. On April 5 at Invasion Attack 2015, Roppongi Vice defeated The Young Bucks to win the IWGP Junior Heavyweight Tag Team Championship. They lost the title back to The Young Bucks on May 3 at Wrestling Dontaku 2015. Later that month, Beretta entered the 2015 Best of the Super Juniors, where he finished with a record of four wins and three losses, failing to advance to the finals of the tournament. Following the tournament, Roppongi Vice received a rematch for the IWGP Junior Heavyweight Tag Team Championship in a three-way match, also involving reDRagon, but were again defeated by The Young Bucks on July 5 at Dominion 7.5 in Osaka-jo Hall.

On April 10, 2016, at Invasion Attack 2016, Roppongi Vice defeated Matt Sydal and Ricochet to win the IWGP Junior Heavyweight Tag Team Championship for the second time. They lost the title back to Sydal and Ricochet on May 3 at Wrestling Dontaku 2016. On November 5 at Power Struggle, Roppongi Vice defeated A. C. H. and Taiji Ishimori in the finals to win the 2016 Super Jr. Tag Tournament. On January 4, 2017, at Wrestle Kingdom 11 in Tokyo Dome, Roppongi Vice defeated The Young Bucks to win the IWGP Junior Heavyweight Tag Team Championship for the third time. They lost the title to Suzuki-gun (Taichi and Yoshinobu Kanemaru) at NJPW's 45th anniversary show on March 6, before regaining it on April 27. They lost the title to The Young Bucks on June 11 at Dominion 6.11 in Osaka-jo Hall. On July 2 at G1 Special in USA, Roppongi Vice unsuccessfully challenged The Young Bucks for the title in a rematch. Afterwards, Romero brought up a five-year plan he and Beretta had made three years earlier, which included them winning the IWGP Junior Heavyweight Tag Team Championship and the Super Jr. Tag Tournament, both of which they had already done, as well as Beretta's eventual transition into the heavyweight division. Having failed to regain the IWGP Junior Heavyweight Tag Team Championship, Romero gave Beretta his blessing to move to the heavyweight division, effectively disbanding Roppongi Vice. Roppongi Vice's farewell match took place on September 16 at Destruction in Hiroshima, where they defeated Bullet Club's Chase Owens and Yujiro Takahashi.

==== Heavyweight division (2017–2019) ====
Following the dissolution of Roppongi Vice, Beretta wrestled his first singles match as a heavyweight on September 24 at Destruction in Kobe, where he defeated Takahashi. On November 5 at Power Struggle, Beretta unsuccessfully challenged Kenny Omega for the IWGP United States Heavyweight Championship. At the end of the year, Beretta teamed with the debuting Chuckie T. in the 2017 World Tag League, where they finished with a record of four wins and three losses, failing to advance to the finals. On January 4, 2018, Beretta, Tomohiro Ishii and Toru Yano won a five-team gauntlet match at Wrestle Kingdom 12 in Tokyo Dome to become the new NEVER Openweight 6-Man Tag Team Champions. They dropped the title the following day to Bullet Club (in the form of Bad Luck Fale, Tama Tonga and Tanga Loa), who were the previous champions. Beretta left NJPW in February 2019.

=== Ring of Honor (2015–2019) ===
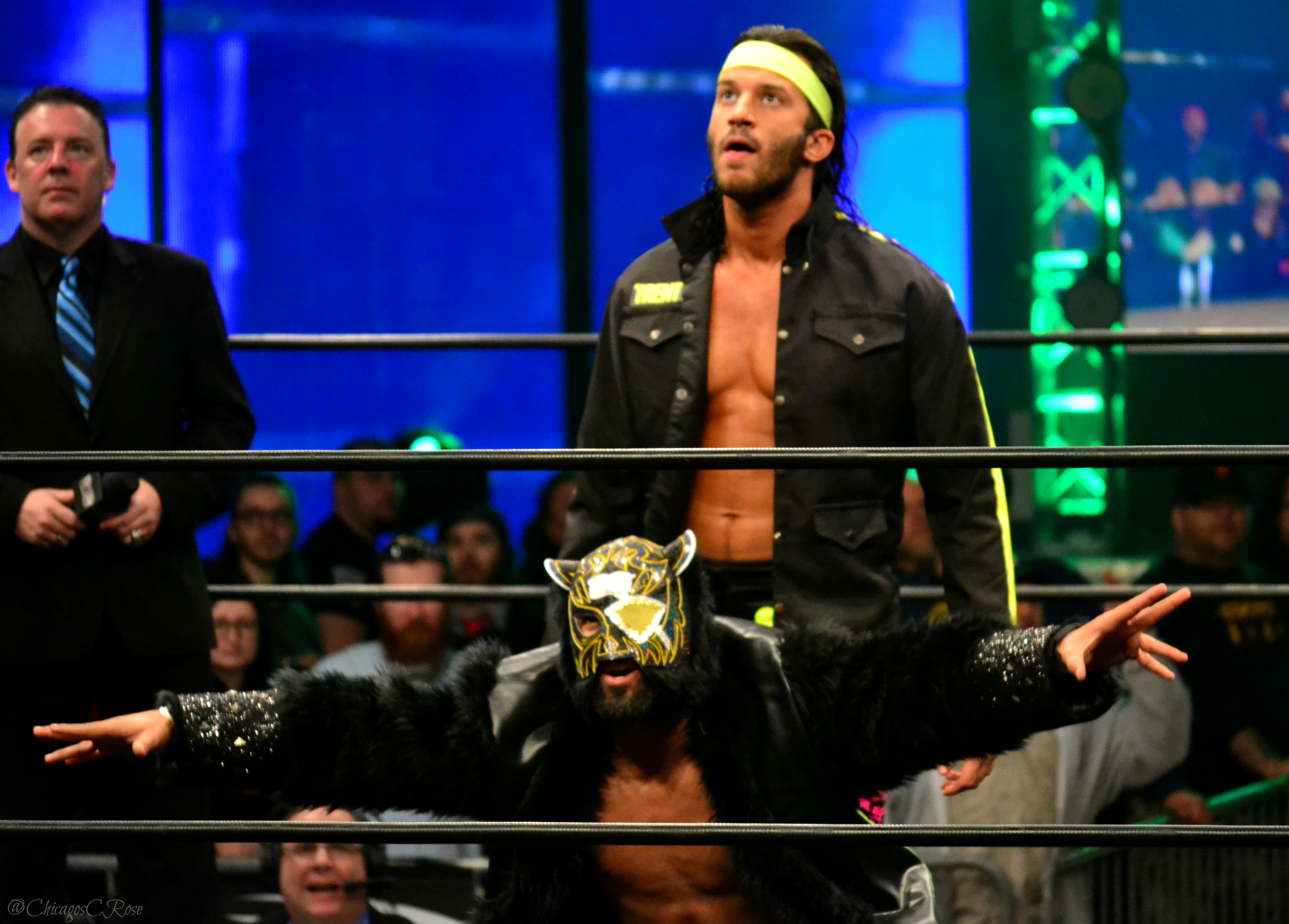
Roppongi Vice in February 2016

On March 1, 2015, at Ring of Honor's 13th Anniversary Show, Rocky Romero announced he was forming a new tag team named Roppongi Vice with Beretta. The following day, Beretta was pulled from his scheduled Evolve events and announced for Ring of Honor (ROH) events. Roppongi Vice made its ROH debut on March 13, 2015, defeating The Decade (B. J. Whitmer and Jimmy Jacobs). On March 14, 2016, at ROH TV tapings, they won a seven tag team gauntlet match to determine #1 contender for ROH World Tag Team Championships by defeating The Young Bucks after entering the match as the seventh team.

On March 10 at the 15th Anniversary Show, Roppongi Vice was unsuccessful in capturing the ROH World Tag Team Championship in a three-way Las Vegas Street Fight against The Hardys and The Young Bucks.

In June, Barreta start to team with his former tag team partner Chuck Taylor as "Best Friends". They were unsuccessful in capturing the ROH World Tag Team Championship in two occasions, first at Best in the World in a tornado three-way match against War Machine and The Young Bucks, and the second at Final Battle against The Motor City Machine Guns.

=== All Elite Wrestling (2019–present) ===
==== Best Friends (2019–2024) ====
On February 7, 2019, Beretta along with Chuck Taylor appeared at All Elite Wrestling's Las Vegas rally and announced that they were going to be joining the promotion. They would debut at All Elite Wrestling's debut show, AEW Double or Nothing where they would wrestle Angélico and Jack Evans. They would go on to win the match but were attacked by The Dark Order's Stu Grayson and Evil Uno after a post-match hug between the two teams. He has since ceased his last name, going by Trent. On the October 30, 2019, episode of Dynamite, Trent, Taylor, and newfound ally Orange Cassidy dressed up as Rick and Morty before they won in a 6-man tag-team match against Alex Reynolds, John Silver, and Q. T. Marshall. At Bash at the Beach on January 15, 2020, Best Friends competed in a four-way tag team match to determine the number one contenders for the AEW World Tag Team Championship, which was won by "Hangman" Adam Page and Kenny Omega. On the May 1 edition of Dynamite, Trent teamed up with Chuck Taylor against Kip Sabian and Jimmy Havoc scoring a victory in a no disqualifications tag team match. At the Double or Nothing Buy-In, Best Friends defeated Private Party (Isiah Kassidy & Marq Quen) in a number one contender's match for the AEW World Tag Team Championship after delivering the Strong Zero on Quen. On the June 10 edition of Dynamite, Best Friends and Orange Cassidy defeated The Inner Circle's Jake Hager and Santana and Ortiz in a 6-man tag team match, after which they suffered a beatdown from the rest of The Inner Circle, with Orange Cassidy suffering the worst beating after Chris Jericho hit him with a bag of blood oranges. Best Friends would seek revenge against Chris Jericho and Sammy Guevara (Le Sex Gods) while putting their tag team title #1 contendership on the line on the June 17 edition of Dynamite. They emerged victorious after Guevara tripped over the cameraman's hand which enabled Trent to pick up the victory for the team. The cameraman who was at ringside turned out to be Orange Cassidy who then proceeded to beat down Jericho. Trent and Taylor would receive their tag team title shot against Kenny Omega and "Hangman" Adam Page at Fyter Fest night 1, which they lost.

In late August, Trent and Chuck Taylor started a feud with The Inner Circle's Santana and Ortiz after Ortiz destroyed the van of Sue, Trent's mom. This would culminate in a highly praised Parking Lot Brawl on the September 16 episode of Dynamite, where the Best Friends won. That match was rated 5 stars by wrestling journalist Dave Meltzer.

On November 9, 2020, Trent became the inaugural BTE World Champion by defeating Matt Jackson and John Silver in a three-way Gator Golf match. He would lose the championship to John Silver on November 16, 2020, in a water bottle flip contest.

On the March 31, 2021, episode of Dynamite, Trent made his return arriving from Sue's minivan, where he went on to neutralize Miro. On the December 8, 2021, episode of Dynamite, Trent, once again with his last name and now sporting a buzz cut, made his return to the promotion via a dropoff from his mother Sue's minivan, making the save for Chuck Taylor, Rocky Romero and Orange Cassidy against Adam Cole and the Young Bucks. Trent had previously been absent from the program for a prolonged amount of time due to neck fusion surgery.

==== Don Callis Family (2024–present) ====
On the April 3, 2024 episode of Dynamite, Trent attacked Orange Cassidy using the knee strike, thus turning him heel after the duo lost a match to the Young Bucks. On the April 27 episode of AEW Rampage, Trent defeated Chuck Taylor in a Parking Lot Brawl. On the May 8 episode of Dynamite, Trent lost to Orange Cassidy. A rematch was scheduled for Double or Nothing, where Trent lost to Cassidy again. On the following episode of Dynamite, Trent joined the Don Callis Family. On the July 13 episode of AEW Collision, Trent was hit in the back of the head with a monkey wrench by Cassidy, this was done to write Trent off television to allow him to get surgery to fix two broken screws in his neck, which were damaged after a previous match following his neck fusion surgery.

On the April 17, 2025 at the Spring BreakThru episode of Collision, Trent returned from injury, assisting Rocky Romero and the rest of the Don Callis Family in attacking Tomohiro Ishii. As of result, Trent and Romero reformed RPG Vice At All In Zero Hour, RPG Vice teamed with stablemates Hechicero and Lance Archer, losing to "Big Boom!" A.J. and The Conglomeration (Hologram, Kyle O'Reilly, and Tomohiro Ishii) .

== Other media ==
Marasciulo appeared in a 2011 episode of Silent Library alongside Dolph Ziggler, Chris Masters, Curt Hawkins, JTG, and Caylen Croft.

== Personal life ==
Marasciulo is the middle son of three boys born to Al and Sue. Sue is a retired schoolteacher and the author of two children's books designed to assist children with dyslexia overcome their reading challenges.

Sue initially made her AEW debut during Best Friends' feud with Santana and Ortiz. She first made her appearance at Fyter Fest, driving her son and his tag team partner Dustin Howard (better known as Chuck Taylor) before their title match in her Honda Odyssey minivan, and has since made several more appearances, always driving a white minivan of some brand.

Sue would often refer to Marasciulo by a nickname of his real first name, "Greggie", on TV.

== Championships and accomplishments ==
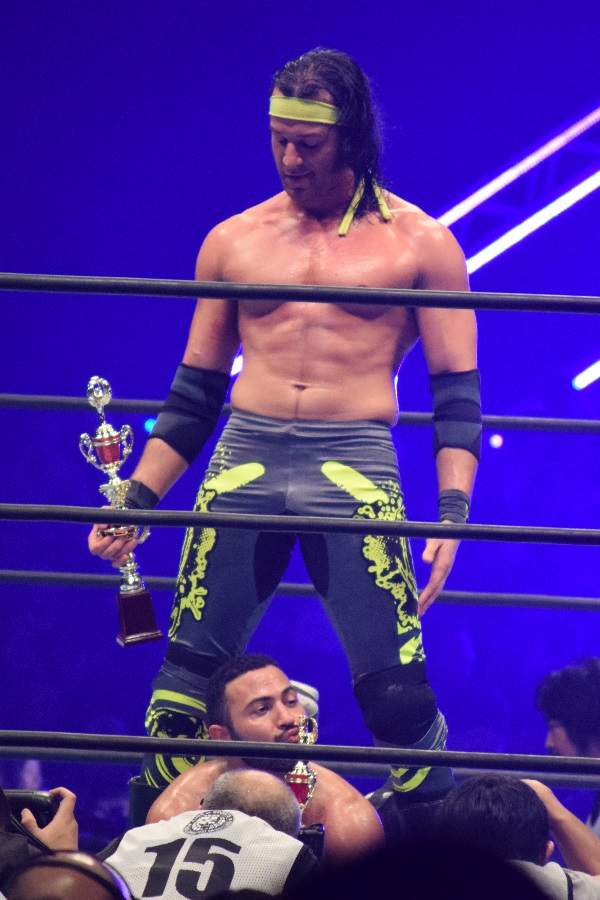
Roppongi Vice after winning the 2016 Super Jr. Tag Tournament

- All Elite Wrestling
  - Dynamite Award (1 time)
    - Hardest Moment to Clean Up After (2021) – (Best Friends vs Santana and Ortiz) – Dynamite (September 16)
- Dragon Gate USA
  - Open the United Gate Championship (1 time) – with Anthony Nese and Caleb Konley (Note: When Nese and Konley won the title, Barreta could defend the title with either of them under the Freebird Rule.)
  - Six-Man Tag Team Tournament (2014) – with Anthony Nese and Caleb Konley
- Empire State Wrestling
  - Ilio DiPaolo Memorial Cup (2013)
- Florida Championship Wrestling
  - FCW Florida Tag Team Championship (2 times) – with Caylen Croft (2) and Curt Hawkins (1) (Note: When Croft and Hawkins won the title, Barreta could defend the title with either of them under the Freebird Rule.)
- Full Impact Pro
  - FIP World Heavyweight Championship (1 time)
- New Japan Pro-Wrestling
  - IWGP Junior Heavyweight Tag Team Championship (4 times) – with Rocky Romero
  - NEVER Openweight 6-Man Tag Team Championship (1 time) – with Tomohiro Ishii and Toru Yano
  - Super Jr. Tag Tournament (2016) – with Rocky Romero
- New York Wrestling Connection
  - NYWC Heavyweight Championship (1 time)
  - NYWC Hi-Fi Championship (3 times)
  - NYWC Tag Team Championship (1 time) – with Maverick
  - NYWC Hall of Fame (2017)
- Pro Wrestling Illustrated
  - Faction of the Year (2025) as part of the Don Callis Family
  - Dynamite Duumvirate Tag Team Title Tournament (2014) – with Chuck Taylor
- Pro Wrestling Illustrated
  - Ranked No. 91 of the top 500 singles wrestlers in the PWI 500 in 2017
- Westside Xtreme Wrestling
  - wXw World Tag Team Championship (1 time) – with Matt Striker
- WrestleCircus
  - Big Top Tag Team Championship (1 time) – with Rocky Romero
