= Smith Hart =

American-Canadian professional wrestler (1948–2017)

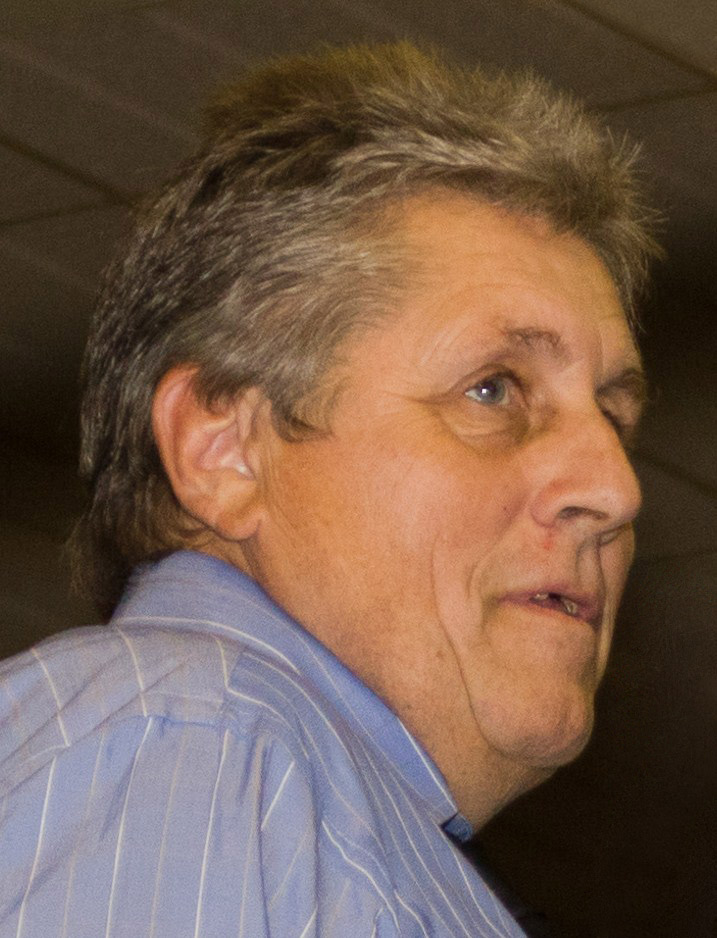
- Hart in 2011

Personal information
- Born: Smith Stewart Hart; November 28, 1948 Long Beach, New York, U.S.
- Died: July 2, 2017 (aged 68) Calgary, Alberta, Canada
- Spouse: Maria Rosado (m. 1979; died 1998)
- Children: 6, including 2 step-children
- Family: Hart

Professional wrestling career
- Ring name(s): Smith Hart; Stu Hart
- Billed height: 5 ft 10 in (178 cm)
- Billed weight: 221 lb (100 kg)
- Billed from: Calgary, Alberta, Canada
- Trained by: Stu Hart
- Debut: 1973
- Retired: 1991

Smith Stewart Hart (November 28, 1948 – July 2, 2017) was an American-Canadian professional wrestler and a member of the Hart wrestling family. His parents were Stu and Helen Hart. Smith was the first of their twelve children. Being one of their eight sons, Bruce, Keith, Wayne, Dean, Bret, Ross and Owen followed him. Hart is also the father of two professional wrestlers, Mike and Matt Hart. Hart wrestled for the majority of his career in Canada but also worked briefly in other countries and is best known for his time in Stampede Wrestling and for his appearances for WWE. He died in 2017 due to prostate cancer.

== Early life ==
Hart was born in New York and was a dual citizen of the United States and Canada.

He was of Greek descent through his maternal grandmother and Irish through his maternal grandfather. His father was mainly of Scots-Irish descent but also had Scottish and English ancestry.

When he was less than a year old his mother, Helen Hart, suffered an automobile accident while pregnant with his younger brother Bruce. As a result, he was sent to live with his maternal grandparents, Harry and Elizabeth Smith, for over two years.

Smith taught his younger brother Bret to draw.

== Professional wrestling career ==
=== As a wrestler ===
He wrestled in his father's Stampede Wrestling promotion and in Puerto Rico's World Wrestling Council, as well as trips to Japan, England, Germany and the Netherlands. He also helped out behind the scenes at Stampede Wrestling.

==== Stampede, Japan and National Wrestling Alliance ====
In 1973 Hart debuted for his father's promotion Stampede Wrestling in a tag team match with Bob Pringle against Joe Tomasso and Super Hawk in Regina. He later went on that same year to working in matches with Frank Butcher. Late that year he also tag teamed with his brother Bruce against Frank Butcher and Kim Klokeid.

In 1974 Hart began working for the Japanese promotion International Wrestling Enterprise, he first worked in a match against Katsuzo Oiyama in Sagamihara. Hart was sent to Japan primarily to train since his father wanted him to get more experience and discipline. Hart's brother Bret has stated that Hart suffered through a lot of stress and was unhappy during this period. Hart has claimed that his time in Japan caused the breakup with his then girlfriend and mother of his first child, Marla.

From 1977 to 1980 Hart worked and wrestled in collaboration with Stampede Wrestling and the National Wrestling Alliance in matches against Gordon Ivey, Jim Custer and Steve Novak among others. In this period, he also was in a three-man tag team stable together with his brothers Bruce and Keith, they wrestled and defeated Bud Osborne, John Foley and Ray Osborne.

==== Stampede Wrestling and Universal Wrestling Promotions ====
In late 70s Hart traveled to Puerto Rico together with his younger brother Bret. They won the UWP Caribbean Tag Team Championship together. Hart met his wife Maria while working in Puerto Rico.

In the early 80s Hart worked for Stampede Wrestling where he mostly participated in singles matches against wrestlers such ad Otis Young, Bill Jodoin, T.G. Stone and Joe Tomasso but also in a lot of tag team matches with his brother Keith against people such as Kerry Brown and the Cuban Assassin. He also tag teamed with brother in-law Jim Neidhart regularly against Carlos Peron, José Peron, Duke Myers and Texas Red Miller. Outside of that he at times worked in three man tag teams with Dan Kroffat and Barabas were they competed with Fidel Castillo, José Peron and Carlos Peron.

Hart continued to wrestle in Puerto Rico and in Montreal in the late 80s after Stampede Wrestling was shut down and sold to WWE.

==== Independent circuit ====
On June 24, 2011, Hart wrestled for the Great North Wrestling promotion in a match which he lost against The Spoiler. On May 24, 2013, he returned once again to the ring at the Grange Hall arena in Lefroy, Ontario in a match for Pure Wrestling Association where he defeated Mad Braddock. He was there together with his step-son Mike who also wrestled at the event.

=== Appearances for WWF/E ===
At the 1994 SummerSlam event Hart and his brothers can be seen attempting to climb the cage in which Bret and Owen Hart had their match.

On March 28, 2010, Hart made an appearance at Wrestlemania 26 to help his brother Bret defeat Vince McMahon in a No Holds Barred Match. The storyline was that McMahon had paid off Smith and all the other Hart family members to betray Bret, but they all doublecrossed him and helped Bret win the match.

Hart also appeared on WWE television at his father Stu's Hall of Fame induction together with his sibling.

=== As a promoter ===
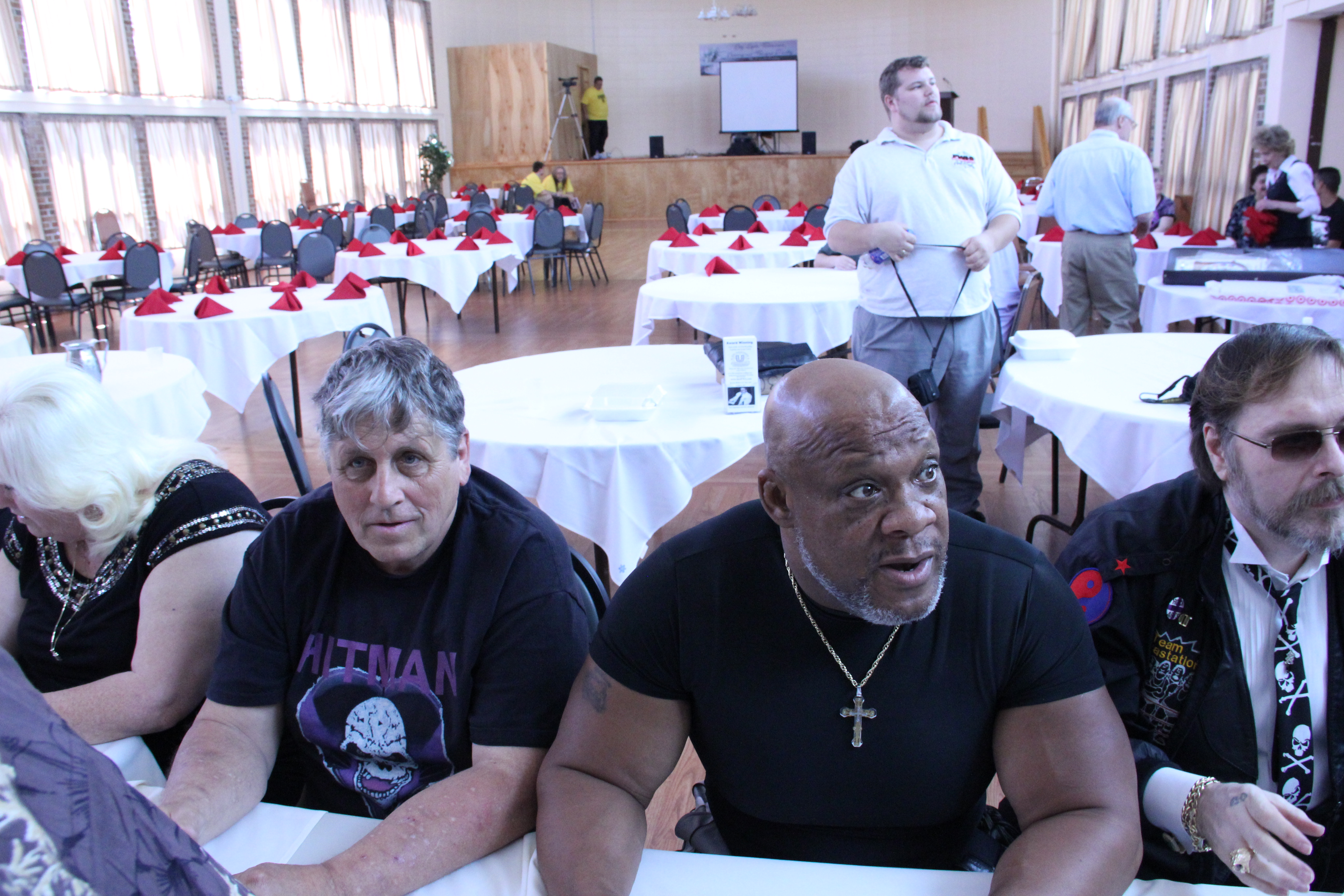
Smith Hart and Tony Atlas in 2012

From 1995 until 2003 Smith Hart alongside Ike Shaw, promoted International Championship Wrestling, later named All Canadian Wrestling in and around Ontario with a base in Cambridge alongside the ICW Hart Brothers School of Wrestling he co-operated, though Waldo Von Erich served as head trainer.

On November 6, 2011, Smith brought back Stampede Wrestling in Barrie, Ontario.

In February 2013 Smith became an executive member of the Victory Commonwealth Wrestling board of directors along with "Soulman" Rocky Johnson, father of Dwayne "The Rock" Johnson. He has since made many appearances for the company under both the VCW and Hogtown Pro Wrestling names.

In April 2014 Hart announced that David Benoit, the son of late wrestler Chris Benoit was to make his in ring debut for the Hart Legacy Wrestling promotion on July 18 in a tag team match with Chavo Guerrero. Hart claimed that Benoit had been trained by his nephew David Hart Smith. The match was later canceled in May when Chris Jericho informed Guerrero that David did not have any formal training. Hart had told different versions to the two men, to Guerrero he had said that David had received training for the match but had also told Jericho that David would not be wrestling, just involved in a storyline.

He was at one point booker for the Canadian-based Great North Wrestling company.

=== Other work in wrestling ===
Hart opened a "Hart Brothers Wrestling School" in Cambridge, Ontario, which has trained many wrestlers including the Highlanders.

On November 19, 2013, Smith joined PWMania.com as a columnist.

== Other media ==
In 2011 Hart appeared the Canadian show Dragon's Den, Season 6 Episode 4. Hart and his son Matt are the subjects of the documentary Hart Still Beating, directed by Fred Kroetsch and Kurt Spenrath.

== Personal life ==
=== Family ===
Hart had four children, including sons Matthew and Chad, daughters Toby McIvor and Satania Hart.

Two of his sons, {Step-Son}Michael and Matthew, also have a career in wrestling. Both perform mainly in Canada on the independent scene; Michael wrestles mainly for the Pure Wrestling Association, and Matt for Real Canadian Wrestling and Canadian Wrestling's Elite.

=== Legal issues ===
In 1978, Hart was attending the Oktoberfest in Germany together with Tom Billington and his brother Bruce to represent Stampede Wrestling in an international wrestling tournament, when Hart was called out he entered the ring with a Hitler mustache and performed a Nazi salute in an attempt to play a joke on the other wrestlers.

After the Hart House was put up for sale following the death of Stu Hart in October 2003, Smith refused to move out and hid inside it. He had used the family mansion as a rent house to make money and was unwilling to give it up. Even after the doors and windows were barricaded he managed to enter through the balcony and had to eventually to be escorted out by police.

Hart is one of 96 known people on an Alberta Justice website who owe a combined $6.6 million in court-ordered Maintenance Enforcement Program (MEP) payments to spouses and children.

=== Illness and death ===
Smith Hart was diagnosed with prostate cancer in 2016, and underwent chemotherapy, progressing to terminal stage by February 2017; he announced in June via Facebook to have entered hospice care. Hart's death was announced on July 2. A service of remembrance in Hart's honour was held at the Calgary Marlborough Community Association, 636 Marlborough Way N.E. Calgary, Alberta on Monday, July 10, 2017.

Since his death, Real Canadian Wrestling has put on memorial shows in Hart's honor.

== Championships and accomplishments ==
- World Wrestling Council
  - WWC Caribbean Tag Team Championship (1 time) - with Bret Hart
- Canadian Wrestling Hall of Fame
  - Class of 2001
- Prairie Wrestling Alliance
  - Prairie Wrestling Alliance Hall of Fame (Class of 2010)
- Totally Driven Entertainment
  - Totally Driven Hall of Fame (class of 2017)
