= Teddy Hart =

Canadian professional wrestler (born 1980)

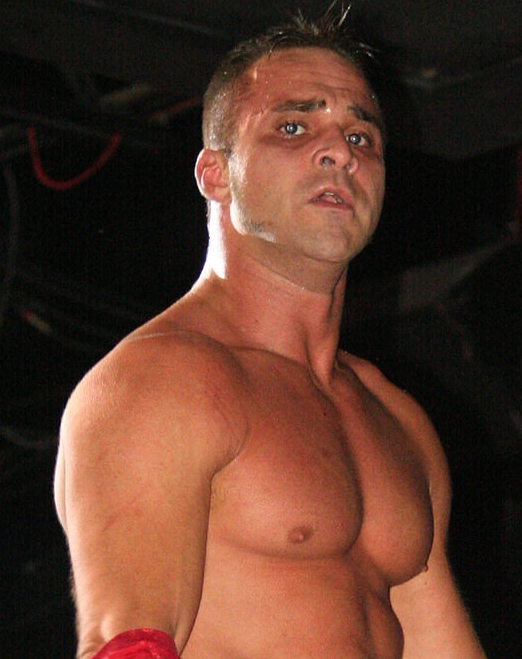
- Hart in 2015

Personal information
- Born: Edward Ellsworth Annis; February 2, 1980 (age 46) Calgary, Alberta, Canada
- Spouse: Fay Annis (m. 2012; div. 2014)
- Children: 1
- Family: Hart

Professional wrestling career
- Ring name(s): Teddy Hart; Ted Hart
- Billed height: 6 ft 1 in (1.85 m)
- Billed weight: 195 lb (88 kg)
- Billed from: Calgary, Alberta, Canada
- Trained by: Ross Hart; Bruce Hart; Leo Burke; Dory Funk Jr.
- Debut: 1995

Edward Ellsworth Annis (born February 2, 1980) is a Canadian-American professional wrestler, better known by his ring name Teddy Hart. He currently works on the independent circuit. He is one-half of the RCW (Real Canadian Wrestling) Tag Team Champions with Steven Styles. He is best known for his tenure with Major League Wrestling (MLW) as the leader of The Hart Foundation, where he held the MLW World Middleweight and MLW Tag Team championships. He has also wrestled known as a tenures for his time AAA, the short-lived Wrestling Society X, Jersey All Pro Wrestling, and Dragon Gate USA. He operates a wrestling school in Edmonton. He is the son of Georgia Hart of the Hart wrestling family and wrestler B. J. Annis. He is also the nephew of former professional wrestlers Bret Hart and Owen Hart. Hart achieved an early degree of fame when he became the youngest wrestler to be signed to the World Wrestling Federation (now WWE). His subsequent release, controversial actions while wrestling on the independent circuit and various legal problems have earned him a measure of infamy.

Outside of the ring, Annis has been a mentor to several young wrestlers and has been a trainer at wrestling schools. Among his trainees are Jack Evans, Pete Wilson and his younger cousin Matt Hart. Annis is also a cat lover and breeder of Persian cats which he has used sometimes in storylines and brought with him to matches.

== Early life ==
Annis is the oldest male grandchild of Stu and Helen Hart and the second oldest overall. His mother is of Greek descent through her maternal grandmother and Irish through her maternal grandfather. His maternal grandfather was of Scots-Irish, English and Scottish descent. On his father's side he is part Italian. He is the nephew of former professional wrestlers Bret Hart, Owen Hart, Bruce Hart, Keith Hart, Smith Hart, Ross Hart, Dean Hart, and Wayne Hart. Annis holds dual citizenship with Canada and the United States.

Annis grew up with three siblings, two sisters named Annie and Angela, as well as a younger brother named Matthew who died of necrotizing fasciitis in 1996. Annis is the cousin of fellow professional wrestlers Natalya Neidhart, Mike Hart, Matt Hart, Harry Smith, Bruce Hart Jr. and Torrin Hart as well as wrestling personalities Lindsay Hart and Georgia Smith.

== Professional wrestling career ==
=== Early career (1995–1998) ===
Hart debuted in July 1995 at Rockyford, Alberta, where he teamed up with his brother, Matthew, and defeated his cousin Harry Smith and T. J. Wilson. In the Calgary, Alberta-based Stampede Wrestling promotion, Hart teamed with Smith, Wilson and Jack Evans. In 2000, he wrestled for and was a key creative figure in the Matrats promotion. At the age of 16, he wrestled in the opening match of a World Wrestling Federation house show in Calgary, teaming with his cousin Harry Smith against Andrew Picarnic and T. J. Wilson as a tribute to his brother, Matthew, who had recently died.

=== World Wrestling Federation (1998–2002) ===
In 1998, Hart became the youngest person ever to be signed to a World Wrestling Federation developmental contract, and was sent to train with Dory Funk, Jr. at the "Funkin' Conservatory". However, he was later released by the WWF, due to alleged attitude problems.

=== Ring of Honor (2003) ===
On September 20, 2003, Teddy wrestled for Ring of Honor in Philadelphia on their September event Glory by Honor II, where he defeated partner and friend, TJ Wilson. Backstage, however, the Special K faction confronted Hart, and mocked him for not being a good high-flying wrestler. On November 1, 2003, Hart competed at a Ring of Honor show in Elizabeth, New Jersey as part of a Scramble Cage match. After losing the match, he began to perform moonsaults and executed a shooting star press from the top of the cage rather than selling the moves he had taken. Hart then vomited at ringside. His actions attracted the ire of many wrestlers, as he endangered some wrestlers by performing moves on them which they were not anticipating. Hart attributes his actions to a concussion suffered during the match, and has since only wrestled at two ROH shows, At Our Best, on March 13, 2004, and Final Battle on December 19, 2009, against Jack Evans.

=== NWA Total Nonstop Action (2003–2004) ===
Hart made several appearances with NWA Total Nonstop Action. In August 2003, he defeated Jonny Storm and then lost to Juventud Guerrera in the course of the Super X Cup Tournament. He returned in March 2004 as a member of Team Canada, and represented them as its original captain in the second America's X-Cup, where Hart defeated Mr. Águila in the first match. He was released from the promotion following an altercation in a restaurant with CM Punk stemming from the Elizabeth ROH show, where Sabu had to separate the two.

=== Major League Wrestling (2004) ===
The Hart Foundation stable would later compete in Major League Wrestling, where Hart teamed with Evans as The Hart Foundation 2.0, as well as being labeled "The New Hart Foundation". MLW's TV series, MLW Underground would be the first appearance for Hart, Smith, Evans and TJ Wilson on a major cable television network.

On January 9, 2004, Hart defeated Bryan Danielson in a match billed as "Shawn Michaels' top protégé (Danielson) vs. the last student of the Hart family dungeon (Hart)”, playing up the Montreal screwjob and bitter real-life rivalry between Michaels and Bret Hart.

=== Jersey All Pro Wrestling (2004–2007) ===
In 2004, Hart began competing for Jersey All Pro Wrestling, and won the promotion's Tag Team Championship with Jack Evans by defeating The Strong Style Thugs (Homicide and B-Boy) in a steel cage tag team match at Caged Fury, with help from Hart's uncle Jim Neidhart. After being champions for nearly four months, Evans and Hart lost the titles to the Backseat Boyz. Three months later, Hart teamed up Homicide, one of the men he beat for the Tag Team Championship, to defeat the Backseat Boyz for the titles, giving Hart his second reign and Homicide his fifth. A little over a week later, however, they lost the titles back to the Backseat Boyz.

On January 7, 2006, Hart defeated Azrieal to become the new Light Heavyweight Champion in a Gauntlet match at Wild Card II. Four months later, Hart lost the title to Frankie Kazarian in a triple threat match also involving A.J. Styles.

On July 29, 2006, Hart took on Jay Lethal at a JAPW event in Aberdeen, New Jersey. The match culminated with Hart climbing on top of a soda machine and delivering a moonsault onto Lethal. The match was briefly stopped while Hart stepped out into the parking lot to recover. Hart managed to recuperate in time and then returned to the ring, where he won the match.

On October 28, 2006, Hart defeated Homicide, Low Ki, and Necro Butcher at the JAPW ninth Anniversary Show in Rahway, New Jersey to win the vacated JAPW Heavyweight Championship (the reigning JAPW champion, Rhyno had no showed the event). On January 23, 2007, Hart was stripped of the JAPW Heavyweight Championship due to problems with the promoter and was released from the company.

=== Return to WWE (2005, 2006–2007) ===
In 2005, he made several appearances with WWE, wrestling in dark matches, where he was defeated by Harry Smith and working as an enhancement talent on Velocity, teaming with JD Michaels against The Basham Brothers.

On April 1, 2006, Hart and several of his relatives attended the induction of his uncle Bret into the WWE Hall of Fame. After Wrestling Society X folded, Hart moved to Florida in hopes of earning a development deal with World Wrestling Entertainment, which he received. After being re-signed, he was assigned to the Florida Championship Wrestling developmental facility of WWE.

Hart appeared at the July 18 Ohio Valley Wrestling television taping, participating in a battle royal where the winner faced John Cena at Six Flags Kentucky Kingdom on July 27. Although he lost, it was announced that he and Harry Smith (along with Nattie Neidhart) would face Shad Gaspard and JTG at the same show. The "Next Generation Hart Foundation", began teaming regularly, and would go on to defeat teams such as the James Boys, Charles Evans and Justin LaRouche, Mr. Strongko and Ramón Loco, and Jamin Olivencia and TJ Dalton.

Hart appeared at the debut show for Florida Championship Wrestling, as he defeated Shawn Osbourne and competed in a battle royal and a triple threat match. On September 25, TJ Wilson and Ted DiBiase, Jr. joined the Next Generation Hart Foundation stable alongside Hart, Smith, and Neidhart. On October 2, Hart competed in his last match for the promotion as he and TJ Wilson defeated Mike Mondo and Nick Nemeth. On October 11, Hart was released from the company.

=== Independent circuit (2006–2012) ===
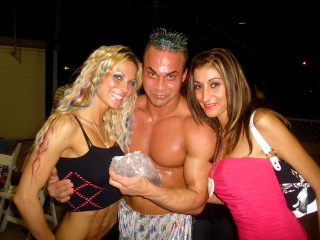
Hart in 2007

On July 1, 2006, Hart made his One Pro Wrestling debut at Fight Club II in Yorkshire, England, and defeated PAC. During the next two months, Hart competed regularly for 1PW, including a 10-man brawl, in which he was eliminated by Abyss after Hart's teammate Steve Corino turned on him.

On September 13, 2006, Hart and Corino wrestled in a grudge match at Pro Wrestling Xplosion's debut show Lighting the Fuse at the infamous ECW Arena. The match ended in a no contest after the referee, who was associated with Corino, claimed that Hart had submitted when he had not. Hart then challenged Corino to a fight in the parking lot, which led to another brawl.

Hart made his debut with AZW Hawaii at their March 29 event Revenge and Retribution. He wrestled in both a singles against SABAKI and a six-man tag team match, where he was partnered with SABAKI and Mark Anarchy against AkuA, DDB and Rocko Shinoda.

He debuted for Florida's Pro Wrestling Dynasty in 2006 as part of "Team Vision" (with Chasyn Rance and Mister Saint Laurent) and helped them win in the main event. He also wrestled the next night for Florida's Coastal Championship Wrestling teaming with Rance, defeating Pablo Marquez and J.P. Ace. He also wrestled for UXW Wrestling in Florida on their June 16, 2006 event "Xtreme Havoc", where he defeated Rance.

On December 1, 2007, at All Pro Wrestling, Hart and Markus Riot defeated Dana Lee and Brian Cage in the main event.

On March 22, 2008, Hart and Jack Evans defeated Ruckus and Trent Acid at PWS Majestic Mayhem in round one of the Majestic Tournament to crown the first ever PWS Champion. In the second round, Evans defeated Hart by countout in a 30-minute match which received a standing ovation. A best of five series was made and the two met for their second encounter on May 2 at Belleville Breakdown, where Hart was victorious.

On May 4, 2012, in Rahway, New Jersey Hart defeated Matt Hardy and Colt Cabana in a triple threat match for Pro Wrestling Syndicate.

=== Wrestling Society X (2006–2007) ===
Hart was part of MTV's Wrestling Society X project, which was filmed in 2006 and premiered in January 2007. He appeared in the inaugural contract rumble, where he was the second man to enter the ring, but did not win. Hart also wrestled tag team matches on later episodes of the show with "M-Dogg 20" Matt Cross, where their tag team was known as "The Filth and the Fury". As a team, Hart and Cross managed to defeat The Trailer Park Boys and Team Dragon Gate. On the fifth episode, Hart had to be stretchered away following his match after landing leg-first on the guardrail and then climbing to the top of the set and executing a moonsault, clashing heads as he landed. WSX ceased operations after their television show was cancelled.

=== Return to JAPW (2007–2008) ===
On October 27, 2007, Hart returned to JAPW after interfering in the fight between Homicide and Low Ki at the JAPW tenth Anniversary Show. On December 8, 2007, Teddy Hart teamed with Low Ki against The Latin American Xchange (LAX) (Homicide and Hernandez) and BLK OUT (Eddie Kingston and Slyk Wagner Brown) in a three-way match for the JAPW Tag Team Championship at Seasons Beatings, however LAX retained.

Hart doing a moonsault off a pull up bar at the Jersey All Pro Wrestling event Reclaiming Hudson on January 19, 2008, in Jersey City.

On January 19, 2008, Hart defeated Homicide and Eddie Kingston in a 3-Way No Disqualification New Jersey Street Fight at Reclaiming Hudson. Less than a month later on February 16, 2008, Hart defeated Kenny Omega and Xavier in a 3-way elimination match at Wild Card IV. After the match, Hernandez hit Hart with the Border Toss. That same night, Hart, in response to being attacked by Hernandez, announced that he would challenge LAX for the Tag Team Titles at Caged Fury and that his partner would be Samoa Joe. On March 8, 2008, LAX defeated Hart and Samoa Joe in a steel cage match to retain the Tag Team Championship at Caged Fury.

=== Return to ROH (2009) ===
On December 19, 2009, more than five and a half years after his last appearance, Hart returned to Ring of Honor at their first live pay-per-view Final Battle 2009, where he was defeated by Jack Evans.

=== AAA ===
==== La Legión Extranjera (2007–2010) ====
Hart made his AAA debut on November 20, 2007, in an Extreme Four Way tag team Ladder Match, where he teamed with Sabu against Crazy Boy and Joe Líder, Charly Manson and Chessman, Extreme Tiger and Halloween for the AAA World Tag Team Championship at Guerra de Titantes. Soon after joining, Hart joined Konnan's heel stable Legión Extranjera (Foreign Legion), where he regularly teams with Evans as The Hart Foundation 2.0. Part of his villainous character is that he cannot speak Spanish and during his promos, AAA captions his remarks in Spanish. On March 16, 2008, Hart lost a $2500 Ladder Battle Royal Match to Xtreme Tiger, which also included Chessman, Juventud Guerrera, Halloween and Joe Líder at Rey de Reyes. On June 13, The Mexican Powers (Crazy Boy, Último Gladiador and Ricky Marvin) defeated La Legión Extranjera (Bryan Danielson, Jack Evans and Teddy Hart), and La Familia de Tijuana (Extreme Tiger, Halloween and TJ Xtreme) in a Three Way Elimination match at Triplemanía XVI. On September 14, La Hermandad Extrema (Joe Líder and Nicho El Millonario) defeated The Hart Foundation 2.0 (Teddy Hart and Jack Evans), The Mexican Powers (Crazy Boy and Último Gladiador) and La Familia de Tijuana (Extreme Tiger and Halloween) in a Four Way Ladder match for the World Tag Team Championship at Verano de Escandalo. After the loss, Hart and Evans began feuding with Líder and Nicho and on October 24, La Hermandad Extrema defeated The Hart Foundation 2.0 (Teddy Hart and Jack Evans), and Los Bello Stones (Alan and Chris Stone) in a Three Way Ladder match for the World Tag Team Championship at the 2008 Antonio Peña Memorial Show. On December 6, Hart and Evans wrestled to a double countout against Líder and Nicho for the World Tag Team Championship at Guerra de Titanes. On March 15, 2009, El Zorro, Hart and Evans defeated Charly Manson and D-Generation Mex (X-Pac and Alex Koslov) at Rey de Reyes. In June 2009 Hart and the rest of Legion Extranjera turned on Evans and kicked him out of the stable. On June 13, Team AAA (El Hijo del Santo, La Parka, Vampiro, Octagón and Jack Evans) defeated La Legion Extranjera (Silver King, Chessman, Kenzo Suzuki, Electroshock and Teddy Hart) at Triplemania XVII to regain control over AAA and force Konnan out of the company. On August 21 at Verano de Escandalo Konnan and Hart returned to AAA with their new version of La Legion Extranjera. In early 2010 AAA suspended Hart indefinitely.

==== Los Perros del Mal (2012–2013) ====
Hart returned to AAA on March 18, 2012, at Rey de Reyes, where he teamed with Chessman in a four-way tag team match, which was won by Joe Líder and Juventud Guerrera and also included the teams of Extreme Tiger and Fénix, and Halloween and Nicho el Millonario. On April 1, El Hijo del Perro Aguayo, who had recently been feuding with Hart's former partner Jack Evans, named Hart the newest member of his Los Perros del Mal stable. On August 5 at Triplemanía XX, Hart reunited with Evans for one night to take part in a Parejas Suicidas steel cage match, featuring three other former tag teams. However, both Hart and Evans managed to escape the cage and avoid having to face each other in a Hair vs. Hair match.

On February 22, 2013, Hart participated on the AAA Canada: Next Generation Wrestling event, competing in the NGW World Title Tournament. Hart reached the finals of the tournament but ultimately would not win the championship.

=== Return to the independent circuit (2014–present) ===
On April 5, 2014, Hart competed for Dragon Gate USA where Hart, Chuck Taylor and Biff Busick faced Anthony Nese, Caleb Konley and Trent Baretta in a losing effort. on May 31, at an ACW event, Hart, Dan Maff and Monsta Mack defeated Azrieal, Danny Demanto and Damien Darling. on October 5, 2014, Hart competed for the Inspire Pro Pure Prestige title in a triple threat match which was won by Thomas Shire.

On August 21, 2015, it was announced that Hart would make his debut for NOVA Pro Wrestling. In January 2016 Hart debuted for Canadian Wrestling's Elite. On July 14, 2016, in his debut for Lucha Libre Elite, Hart was defeated by Diamante Azul.

=== Return to Major League Wrestling (2017–2019) ===
Hart returned to Major League Wrestling (MLW) in 2017 as part of New Era Hart Foundation with cousin Davey Boy Smith Jr. and Brian Pillman Jr. On December 14, 2018, he defeated Dezmond Xavier, El Hijo de L.A. Park, Gringo Loco and Kotto Brazil in a five-way ladder match to win the vacant World Middleweight Championship. At MLW Saturday Night SuperFight on November 2, 2019, Hart defeated Austin Aries via the Canadian Destroyer to retain the MLW World Middleweight Championship. On the November 11, 2019 edition of MLW Fusion Hart was defeated by Myron Reed for the Middleweight Championship. On December 6, MLW posted on their website and social media that Hart had been released from the company. While MLW offered no official explanation for Harts release, anonymous sources speculated that it was the result of ongoing disciplinary issues with Hart, including no showing an event and appearing in the crowds of AEW and NXT shows.

=== Second return to AAA (2018) ===
On April 20, Hart made his return to the company after 5 years away from the AAA, attacking Joe Líder and Pagano. That same night he reappeared with Juventud Guerrera and Kevin Kross, attacking Dr. Wagner Jr., Vampiro and Hernandez after the main event by the AAA Mega Championship. The trio called themselves MAD, and vowed to meet against their upcoming incumbents.

== Other media ==
Annis was the subject of the 2009 documentary A Hart Still Pounding. The project was originally named Ted Hart's Truth and Reality and was almost shut down by the creator, due to having problems with working with Hart. Hart also appeared in the 2016 documentary Hart Still Beating, which is about his uncle Smith and cousin Matt.

Annis is also the subject of the documentary Hart of Darkness by directors Kurt Spenrath and Fred Kroetsch, and the 2022 true crime documentary Dangerous Breed: Crime. Cons. Cats. which was originally being filmed as a "redemption" story, but changed directions upon the mysterious disappearance of Hart's then-girlfriend Samantha Fiddler.

== Personal life ==
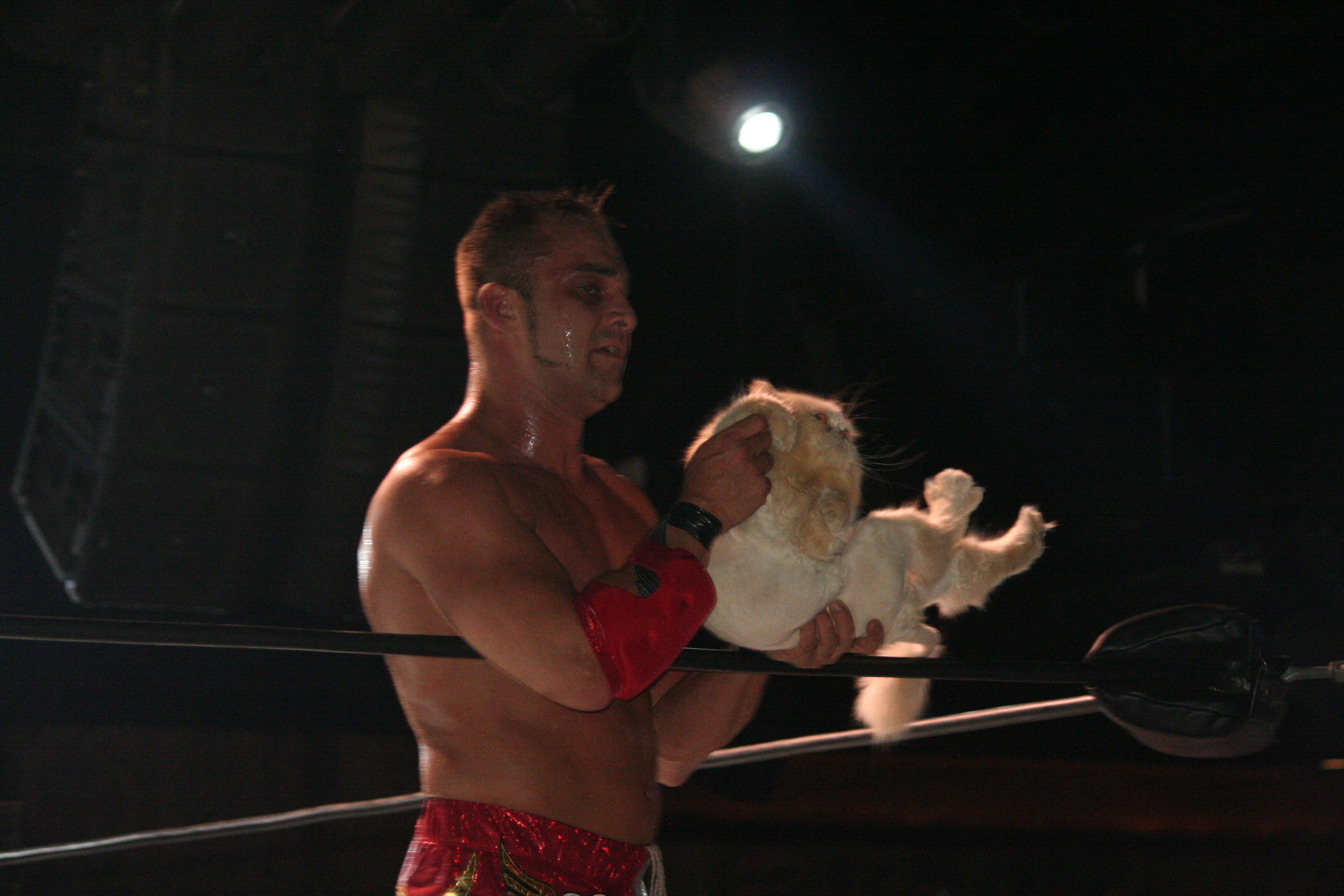
Annis with his cat Mr. Money in 2015.

Annis is a third-generation wrestler; his father, B. J. Annis, and his grandfather Stu Hart were both wrestlers. Annis has a son, Bradley, with his ex-girlfriend Kim. Annis has Bipolar disorder and does not medicate. Annis's great-grandfather Harry Smith also had bipolar disorder, as did his brother Frank.

Annis was married to Fay, and she was involved in his wrestling career, mainly in the Hart Legacy promotion. In 2016 Annis and his wife divorced.

Annis holds Canadian citizenship as a result of his birth in Canada to a Canadian-born mother. He also holds American citizenship due to being born to an American-born father.

On November 19, 2016, Annis's girlfriend Samantha Louise Michelle Fiddler disappeared in Bartow, Florida.

=== Legal troubles ===
On December 3, 2014, the Royal Canadian Mounted Police announced that Annis was wanted on sexual assault charges involving two women. The charges were dropped in June 2016. Annis later opened up about several personal/real-life topics including his rape accusations in an interview hosted by wrestlers Chuckie T and Trent Barreta in January 2015.

On January 1, 2017, Annis was arrested in Arlington, Texas, and was charged with DUI, evading arrest, and auto theft. The charges against Annis were later dropped.

In February 2020, Annis was arrested in Virginia and was charged with possession of a schedule III controlled substance with the intent to sell or distribute.

On March 4, 2020, Annis was once again arrested in Virginia, this time for violating the conditions of his bail by not staying under house arrest.

On March 26, 2020, Annis was arrested in Virginia for a third time after allegedly assaulting his girlfriend, female independent wrestler Maria Manic at the home of another independent wrestler, Ace Montana. Montana claims he had pulled a gun on Annis in order to get him off of Manic. He then called the cops and Annis was arrested and charged with strangulation resulting in wounding/bodily harm. He was held without bail in the Richmond City jail until his court date on April 22.

On October 23, 2020, Annis was arrested in Texas and charged with injuring a disabled person, evading arrest, and being in possession of a controlled substance. Annis was arrested again on the same charges on February 16, 2021, this time in northern Virginia.

== Championships and accomplishments ==
- Atomic Championship Wrestling
  - ACW Heavyweight Championship (2 times)
- Ballpark Brawl
  - Natural Heavyweight Championship (1 time)
  - Natural Heavyweight Championship Tournament (2004)
- Can-Am Wrestling Federation
  - Can-Am Mid-Heavyweight Championship (1 time)
  - Can-Am Tag Team Championships (1 time) – with Mike McFly
- Jersey All Pro Wrestling
  - JAPW Heavyweight Championship (1 time)
  - JAPW Light Heavyweight Championship (1 time)
  - JAPW Tag Team Championship (2 times) – with Jack Evans (1) and Homicide (1)
- Juggalo Championship Wrestling
  - JCW Heavyweight Championship (1 time)
- Major League Wrestling
  - MLW World Middleweight Championship (1 time)
  - MLW World Tag Team Championship (1 time) – with Brian Pillman Jr. and Davey Boy Smith Jr.
  - MLW Wrestler of the Year (2018)
- National Wrestling Alliance
  - NWA North American Tag Team Championship (1 time) – with Big Daddy Yum Yum
- Power Wrestling Alliance
  - PWA Cruiserweight Championship (1 time)
- Pro Wrestling Illustrated
  - Ranked No. 197 of the top 500 singles wrestlers in the PWI 500 in 2009
- Real Canadian Wrestling
  - RCW Tag Team Championship (3 times, current ) – with Pete Wilson (1), Kato (1) and Steven Styles (1)
- Stampede Wrestling
  - Stampede International Tag Team Championship (1 time) – with Bruce Hart
- Omega Pro Wrestling
  - OPW Top Crown Championship (1 time)
  - OPW Top Crown Championship Tournament (2007)
- Canadian Wrestling Hall of Fame
  - Individually
  - With the Hart family

== See also ==
- Hart wrestling family
- List of people with bipolar disorder
