= AMI-télé =

Canadian French-language specialty TV channel

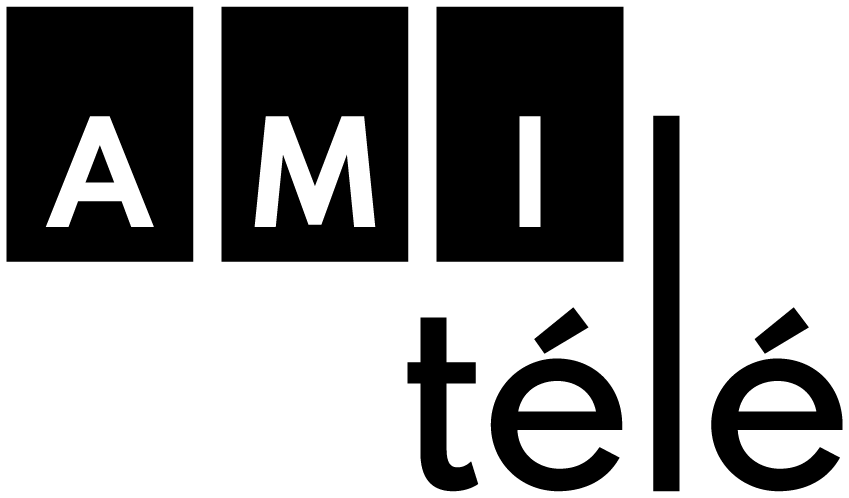
- Country: Canada
- Broadcast area: National
- Headquarters: Toronto, Ontario

Programming
- Picture format: 480i (SDTV); 1080i (HDTV)

Ownership
- Owner: Accessible Media
- Sister channels: AMI-tv

History
- Launched: December 16, 2014

Links
- Website: AMI-télé (in French)

AMI-télé is a Canadian French language digital cable specialty channel owned by the non-profit organization Accessible Media Inc. (AMI). AMI-télé is a French version of AMI's English-language service AMI-tv, and broadcasts a selection of general entertainment programming with accommodations for those who are visually or hearing impaired, consisting of described video on the primary audio track and closed captioning available across all of its programming. The channel also broadcasts series on accessibility- and disability-related topics.

AMI-télé is licensed by the Canadian Radio-television and Telecommunications Commission (CRTC) as a Category A "must-carry" service; it must be carried on the lowest level of service by all licensed digital cable, satellite television, and IPTV providers in Canada.

== History ==
In January 2013, when the CRTC opened a new round of applications for must-carry channels, AMI submitted an application for a French-language sister channel of AMI-TV known as AMI-TV Français, which would have a similar format to its English-language counterpart. AMI justified the need for the channel by noting that the three provinces which host the majority of Canada's francophone population—New Brunswick, Ontario, and Quebec—had above-average levels of vision loss and other vision-related conditions. On August 8, 2013, the CRTC approved the application; the CRTC recognized that given the impact of AMI-tv's English service, a French service would have an equivalent impact on Canada's francophone community.

The service launched on December 16, 2014 as AMI-télé in both SD and HD. Much like AMI-tv, the channel was owned by a joint venture between Shaw Media and Accessible Media, both owning 50%.

On January 13, 2016, Accessible Media announced that it would acquire Shaw Media's stake in AMI-télé, giving it full ownership. The sale was part of a corporate re-organization tied to Shaw Media's proposed sale to Corus Entertainment, which had been approved by the CRTC in March 2016. Shaw Media was renamed to Corus Holdings Inc. four months later on September 1; the transaction was approved by the CRTC on December 20, 2016, and completed on January 1, 2017.
