= Canal M =

Canadian television service

- Canal M logo
- Country: Canada
- Broadcast area: National
- Headquarters: Montreal, Quebec

Ownership
- Owner: Vues & Voix

History
- Launched: 1985
- Former names: Radio de la Magnétothèque (1985 - 2011)

Links
- Website: Canal M (in French)

Canal M is a Canadian 24-hour French language non-profit audio broadcast television service. Canal M is an audio-only service that broadcasts readings of news articles from newspapers and magazines. It is owned by Vues & Voix. Canal M is a volunteer-based service, where individuals perform voice recordings at recording centres in Quebec.

== History ==
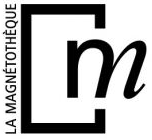
La Magnétothèque logo

The channel originally launched in 1985 as Radio de la Magnétothèque (more commonly referred to as La Magnétothèque, the name of its parent company). The channel was originally operating without a Canadian Radio-television and Telecommunications Commission (CRTC) granted broadcast licence. However, in October 1990, the CRTC officially approved the licence for the service.

Later, in August 2009, the CRTC approved another application by La Magnétothèque that would grant the service mandatory carriage on the basic package of television service providers' systems in Quebec.

original Canal M logo

In March 2011, Radio de la Magnétothèque was renamed Canal M to coincide with the rebranding of its parent company, from La Magnétothèque to Vues & Voix.

== See also ==
- AMI-audio, a similar service for anglophone listeners, operated by an organisation unrelated to Canal M
