= Matt Hart (wrestler) =

Canadian professional wrestler (born 1993)

Personal information
- Born: Matthew Aryan Dean Herweg; January 28, 1993 (age 33) Calgary, Alberta, Canada
- Family: Hart wrestling family

Professional wrestling career
- Ring name(s): Matt Hart; Matthew Hart
- Billed height: 5 ft 11 in (1.80 m)
- Billed weight: 189 lb (86 kg) (2014); 224 lb (102 kg) (2016)
- Billed from: Calgary
- Trained by: Teddy Hart; Smith Hart
- Debut: 2012

Matthew Aryan Dean Herweg (born January 28, 1993), better known by his ring name Matt Hart, is a Canadian professional wrestler. He is a third generation wrestler member of the Hart family and the son of professional wrestler Smith Hart, oldest child of wrestler Stu Hart and promoter Helen Hart. Hart has wrestled extensively on the independent scene in Canada but also in the United Kingdom and the United States. He is the first member of his family to complete the Canadian Death Tour. Hart has regularly performed for the Hart Legacy Wrestling promotion with other members of his family. He was the subject of the 2016 documentary Hart Still Beating.

== Early life ==
Herweg was born to Liane Reiger-Herweg, who was of German and Native American descent, and Smith Hart in 1993. Herweg's father is part of a family of Ulster Scot and Irish heritage through Smith's father Stu Hart. Herweg also has Greek as well as more Irish ancestry through his paternal grandmother Helen Hart. He has an older half-brother named Michael on his mother's side who is also a professional wrestler and three half-siblings on his father's side named Tobi, Tania and Chad, as well as a foster brother named Steven from his father. His middle name Dean is in honor of his uncle Dean Hart who died in 1990. He also shares his first name with his deceased cousin Matthew Annis. Herweg's mother and father separated before he was born but they shared custody, he and his father lived together in the attic of the famed Hart House in Calgary. In 2001 he and his father were among the Hart family members who attended WWF Monday Night RAW to commemorate his uncle Owen who had died two years earlier. Herweg's mother died on his thirteenth birthday on January 28, 2006 after which he was put into foster care due to Canadian authorities deeming his father's career too unstable. After some time Herweg was put in the care of Stacey Olaszak, his father's long time partner. Herweg studied to be a stonemason. As a member of the Hart family Herweg has many relatives in the industry, his cousins Natalie Neidhart, Harry Smith, Teddy Hart, Torrin Hart, and Bruce Hart Jr. are contemporaries in the ring while his cousin Lindsay Hart is an on screen personality for Elite Canadian Championship Wrestling.

== Professional wrestling career ==
=== Various promotions (2012–present) ===
After being separated from his father's side of the family after the death of his mother, Herweg reconnected to them through professional wrestling, deciding to join the industry as soon as he got the chance. Matthew was trained by his father and cousins Teddy Hart and Harry Smith. He debuted in 2012 for his family's promotion, which was known as Stampede Extreme Sports at the time, for the 100th anniversary of the Calgary Stampede. In his first match he wrestled with Teddy and Harry. At later events he would appear with his cousins Tory and Bruce Hart Jr. among other Stampede Wrestling alumni. By March Matt was wrestling in Mecca Pro Wrestling in Ontario for several dates and by August he wrestled against a wrestling champion for the first time with KC Andrews who held the Big West Wrestling Television Championship. In September he worked as a tag team wrestler in a storyline for Thrash Wrestling where his partner betrayed him to become the inaugural Trash Wrestling Tag Team Champion. In 2016 Hart participated in the "Canadian Death Tour", becoming the first Hart family member to do so. 2017 saw Hart traveling to the United Kingdom to wrestle. In May 2022 Hart performed for his cousin Dallas Hart's promotion Dungeon Wrestling.

=== Hart Legacy Wrestling (2012–2019) ===
Hart debuted on the 2012 sneak peek of the promotion but had to take a year off from all wrestling afterwards due to injury. He returned in January 2013 and was a regular performer for the promotion until 2019.

=== Real Canadian Wrestling (2015–present) ===
Hart began wrestling for Real Canadian Wrestling in 2015. He wrestle for the promotions charity show in June that year. In 2017 Hart won his first championship, catching the RCW Tag Team Championship together with tag-team partner D. Dwight Davis as part of the group Hard To Kill. In 2018 Hart was given his uncle Dynamite Kid (Tom Billington)s' robe by his aunt Michelle Billington in a match of the Smith Hart Memorial Tournament. He later got involved in a major storyline with Real Canadian Wrestling's top heel wrestler, Heavy Metal, after he destroyed Harts trophy for winning the Smith Hart Memorial Tournament and destroyed Smiths final letter to his children before Matt could read it. During RCWs collaboration with Impact Wrestling Hart had a feuded with Raj Singh, the son of a Gama Singh who wrestled for Harts grandfather, the feud was popular and heated up the promotion. In January 2020 Hart captured his first singles championship when he won the RCW British Commonwealth Championship. Hart lost the title on March 6, 2020, to his former tag-team partner Davis.

=== Canadian Wrestling's Elite (2016–present) ===
Hart began working for the Canadian Wrestling's Elite by 2016. By September that year Hart wrestled his first world champion in Magnus who held the GFW Global Championship for Global Force Wrestling. In 2017 Hart headlined the tribute show for his father Smith Hart for the promotion, he wrestled with his cousins-in-law "Dynamite" Dan and "Pistol" Pete Wilson. Hart won the match with the Sharpshooter, a move which is deeply connected to his family's history.

== Other media ==
In 2016 Herweg and his father were the subject of the Telus original documentary Hart Still Beating which concerns his childhood, the loss of his mother, his father's then recent diagnosis with terminal cancer and their attempt to grow closer to each other through professional wrestling.

== Personal life ==
Herweg is a cat owner. Herweg is a big fan of The Honky Tonk Man. He is close with his cousin Torrin.

== Championships and accomplishments ==
- Real Canadian Wrestling
  - RCW Tag Team Championship (1 time) - with D. Dwight Davis
  - RCW British Commonwealth Championship (1 time)
  - RCW Hardcore Championship (2 times)
