= Accessible Media Inc. =

Canadian non-profit media company

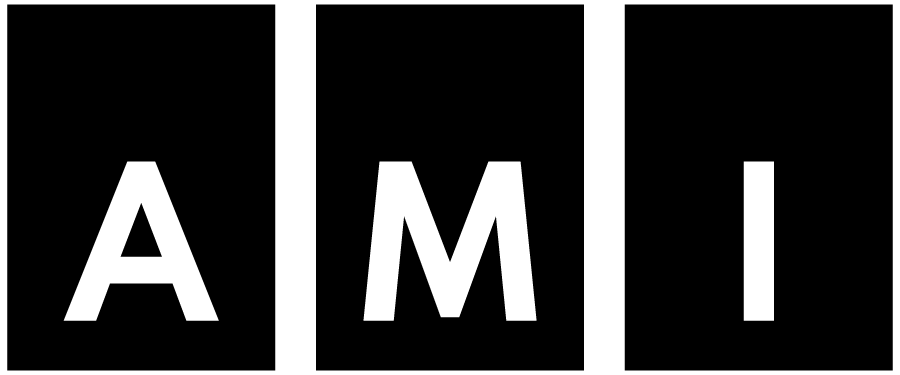
- Company type: Non-profit
- Industry: Media
- Founded: 1989
- Headquarters: Toronto, Ontario, Canada
- Products: Broadcasting, Post-Production
- Website: www.amiplus.ca

Accessible Media Inc. (AMI) is a media company that entertains, informs and empowers Canadians with disabilities through the offering of relevant original content. The company operates three broadcast services: AMI-tv and AMI-audio in English and AMI-télé in French, as well as the free streaming service, AMI+.

== History ==
AMI was established in 1989 as the National Broadcast Reading Service (NBRS) on the Canadian Parliament's Standing Committee of the Status of Disabled Persons. The committee's report, "No News is Bad News", stated that vision- and print-restricted Canadians must have equal access to published news and information.

In 1990, the Canadian Radio-television and Telecommunications Commission (CRTC) granted NBRS a licence for VoicePrint— a radio reading service; the service launched on December 1 that year. In 1995, NBRS launched AudioVision Canada to supply described video services to various film and television projects. In July 2007, the CRTC granted NBRS's licence application for The Accessible Channel, a national specialty channel which would air all of its programming with described video and closed captioning. The channel would launch in 2009.

To reflect its expansion beyond VoicePrint with the launch of The Accessible Channel, the National Broadcast Reading Service was renamed Accessible Media Inc. (AMI) in 2010. On January 30, 2012, as part of an effort to unify AMI's services under one brand for easier cross-promotion, TAC was renamed AMI-tv. VoicePrint followed suit on March 5, 2012, becoming AMI-audio. On June 21, 2012, Accessible Media launched the DV Guide—an online TV listings service that highlights programming across Canadian broadcasters which carry audio descriptions. In 2013, AMI-tv and AMI-audio licences were renewed through 2018 and AMI was awarded a French television licence. AMI's French channel, AMI-télé, launched in December 2014. In 2018, AMI-tv, AMI-audio and AMI-télé licences were renewed through 2023.

In February 2018, AMI launched apps for iOS and tvOS, providing yet another means of consuming AMI-tv original content. Some of the apps' features include accessibility enhancements such as bolded text and high contrast layout.

Noted programming on AMI-tv includes We Were Broncos, Underdog Inc., Crip Trip, You Can't Ask That, Disrupt, Postcards From, Got Game, The Squeaky Wheel: Canada, By Hook or By Cook, Dish with Mary, Mind Your Own Business, Fashion Dis and Breaking Character.

Key programming on AMI-audio includes Reflections, Double Tap, Para Sport Nation, Audiobook Café, My Life in Books with Red Szell and Disability Rights, and Wrongs: The David Lepodcast.

In 2023, AMI unveiled its new, free, streaming site, AMI+. With a streamlined layout, visitors to AMI+ can access AMI’s stable of audio, television and digital content created by and for the disability community. Additionally, visitors can utilize customizable accessibility settings for the blind and partially sighted community AMI serves.

In 2024, AMI expanded its reach by adding programming to Roku. Available with no subscription or sign-in required, AMI+ content includes documentaries and the series Postcards From…, Canadian Screen Award winner By Hook or By Cook, Adaptable Animals, Dish with Mary, Healthy at Home with Bobbi Janzen, Level Playing Field, Mind Your Own Business and Our Community.

== Services ==
AMI operates three main broadcasting services in television and radio. Its services must be carried on the basic tier of all digital television services in the country.

- AMI-tv and AMI-télé: English- and French-language general entertainment specialty channels with open format described video and closed captioning for people who are deaf or hard of hearing.
- AMI-audio: an audio-only television channel and online service offering both live original programming and readings from a selection of magazines and newspapers read by professional narrators.
