= Hart Legacy Wrestling =

Canadian professional wrestling promotion

- Acronym: HLW
- Founded: 2013
- Style: Canadian Wrestling
- Headquarters: Calgary, Alberta, Canada
- Owner(s): Smith Hart (2015–2017); John Oniston (2013); Stacey Angel
- Parent: Universal Ultimate Games inc

Hart Legacy Wrestling (HLW) is a Canadian professional wrestling promotion operated by some members of the Hart wrestling family, it was founded mainly by Teddy Hart and his associates. Smith Hart was also involved with the promotion prior to his death on July 2, 2017. His long-time partner Stacey Angel is the current owner of the promotion. Bret Hart has no involvement in HLW.

== History ==
=== Shows ===
The promotion was announced in 2012, founded and had their first show in the Victoria Pavilion in 2013.

In 2013 HLW held a show at the Stampede Pavilion named "Resurrection". The event starred wrestlers such as, Konnan, Chris Masters, Bobby Lashley, Trent Barreta, Samuray del Sol, The Super Smash Brothers, Cody Hall as well as IWGP Tag Team Champions Davey Boy Smith Jr. (David Hart Smith) and Lance Archer. The event had the final Canadian independent appearance of El Generico before his signing with WWE. It also featured a 12-man battle royale consisting mostly of local talent. Kevin Nash had to pull out of the event after his wife became ill. During the event wrestler Pete Wilson suffered a shoulder injury and was rushed to the ER.

Harry Smith and Teddy Hart would have a rematch in 2014, after that Smith returned after performing in Japan.

In September 2015 an event was held which featured a match for the NWA World Women's Championship between Santana Garrett and Shojo Machiko which Garrett won. It also featured two matches with Teddy Hart.

In December 2015 the promotion held a Hopes & Ropes charity event at the Ranchmans Roadhouse in Calgary. The main event was a match between cousins Teddy Hart and David Hart Smith which ended in a 30 minute time limit draw. The event was put on together with the Aboriginal Friendship Centre of Calgary, the main event between Smith and Hart was for the Stu Hart Heavyweight Championship Belt. The event's goal was to raise money for anti-bullying and self-confidence programs for children.

In February 2016 it was announced that the next event would be held on March 6, 2016, and that the main event would once again be Teddy Hart vs David Hart Smith for the vacant Stu Hart Heritage Title which ended in a 30 minute time limit draw. The event was again held at the Ranchmans Roadhouse. In July 2016 the company held an event called the Stu Hart Memorial Cup at Ranchmans Roadhouse in which featured Davey Boy Smith Jr. defeating Chris Masters to win the Stu Hart Memorial Cup.

In February 2020 a fifth event was held at The Back Alley in Calgary, Alberta, Canada that featured freelancer indie and ammeter pro wrestlers. The event also had an appearance by Ken Shamrock who was a manager for the winning wrestler in the main event.

The promotion had further events planned for 2020 before the COVID-19 pandemic.

=== Controversies ===
==== Payment ====
The 2013 show, "Resurrection", was followed by many wrestlers claiming that the promotion failed to pay them. A hotel manager in the area has also stated that a large amount of rooms were booked but that the bills were never paid by the promotion. Teddy Hart has claimed that the responsibility lays with the owners and promoters, John Oniston and Stacey "Angel" Olszak, others have maintained that Teddy was the one who was said to be in charge. Hart continued to state that he simply lent his name to the event and featured as a wrestler and did not handle any of the other aspect of the promotion.

Wrestler Lance Storm and Jeff Jackson, who served as play by play commentator for the event, have stated that John Oniston who was the promoter for the event had talked to everyone backstage after the show had concluded and ensured them that they would be paid eventually and that they would receive a bonus of 100 C$.

In late 2013 Jackson told to CBC Radio once again mentioned that Oniston had said to him and the other workers from the event that they would be given their money later on and that they would be compensated for their troubles. He added that Teddy Hart, David Hart Smith and Wayne Hart were the only Hart family members to be involved in the promotion at the time of the event. He also stated that while he had at the time still not been paid, he said that he did not expect for his payment to ever come. Jackson claimed that the pavilion which the event was held at had at least between 1200 and 1800 people in it and that the cheapest tickets were for 25 C$, so there should not have been any problem to pay everyone. Jackson claimed that HLW originally planned another event on February 22 that was supposed to feature former WWE wrestler John Morrison but the event was canceled due to issues.

The February show was replaced by a new promotion handled by the same people and the professional wrestling newsletter Figure Four Online made the following statement:

"The Hart Legacy Wrestling promotion in Calgary with all the issues regarding payment to wrestlers has shut down, but essentially the same group, without John Oniston, is running a new promotion called AAA Canada Next Generation Wrestling on 2/22 at the Victoria Pavilion in Calgary with John Morrison, Kevin Nash, Davey Boy Smith Jr., Konnan, Teddy Hart, Jack Evans and Necro Butcher. A press conference was scheduled for Calgary today and they claim that all talent has already been paid in advance. They plan to run an iPPV that will be taped for the next day. B. J. Annis (the father of Teddy Hart) is behind the new company and Spencer Tapley is the front person for talent and media. Tapley wrote a letter to talent, blaming Oniston for being deceitful and said the only reason they were over budget is because others in charge bought airline tickets at the last minute."

The issue was settled by 2015.

==== David Benoit ====
In April 2014 Smith Hart announced that David Benoit, the son of controversial wrestler Chris Benoit was to make his in ring debut for Hart Legacy Wrestling on July 18 in Calgary in a tag team match with Chavo Guerrero, a friend of his father Chris. Hart claimed that Benoit had been trained by his nephew David Hart Smith. The match was later canceled in May when another friend of David's father, Chris Jericho informed Guerrero that David did not have any formal training, prompting Guerrero to pull out of the match. Hart had told different versions to the two men, to Guerrero he had said that David had received training for the match but had also told Jericho that David would not be wrestling, just involved in a storyline. Jericho insisted that David would not be included in the show due to his lack of training and was reportedly upset at the promotion for using David to advertise the show.

== Talent ==
=== Wrestlers ===
- Teddy Hart
- David Hart Smith
- Pete Wilson
- Matt Hart
- Trent Barreta
- Jack Evans
- Brian Cage
- Samuray Del Sol
- El Generico
- Chris Masters
- Lance Archer
- Bobby Lashley
- Lance Storm
- Johnny Devine
- Principal Richard Pound
- Jason the Terrible
- Heavy Metal
- Wavell Starr
- Jim Neidhart
- Brian Pillman Jr.
- Torrin Hart

=== Other ===
- Julie Hart, as chief operations officer
- Stacey "Angel" (Stacey Olaszak), as CEO
- Michelle Billington, ring announcer
- Bronwynne Billington, valet
- Fay Hart (Fay Annis), valet
- Andre Cobreil, general manager
- Wayne Hart, referee
- Alessandro Gazzera, social media manager
- Tim Stein, announcer

== Current champions ==
Championship	Champion(s)	Previous	Event	Date Won	Location
Stu Hart Heritage Championship	David Hart Smith	—	HLW Resurrection	2013	Calgary

== See also ==
- Stampede Wrestling
- Heroes of Wrestling, a PPV which suffered several controversies
