= SiriusXM NHL Network Radio =

- Canada
- Broadcast area: Canada; United States
- Frequency: SiriusXM 91
- Branding: SiriusXM NHL Network Radio

Programming
- Format: Sports Radio
- Affiliations: National Hockey League; American Hockey League (some regular-season, All-Star and playoff broadcasts)

Ownership
- Owner: SiriusXM Canada

History
- First air date: November 2005

Technical information
- Class: Satellite Radio Station

Links
- Website: www.siriusxm.com/channels/siriusxm-nhl-radio

SiriusXM NHL Network Radio is SiriusXM's talk channel dedicated to the sport of ice hockey and the National Hockey League. It features hockey talk during the day and play-by-play at night. It is the only Canadian-produced satellite radio channel available to both subscribers of XM and Sirius Radio in the United States. The director of programming on SiriusXM NHL Network Radio is Peter Berce, while on-air contributors include Scott Laughlin, Gord Stellick, Steve Kouleas, Mick Kern, Dave McCarthy, Shane Malloy, Jake Hahn, Victoria Matiash, and Tyler Madarasz. The station also welcomes a roster of former players to bring insight and perspective, such as Mike Johnson and Martin Biron. Former contributors include Jamie Shalley, Mike Ross, Shawn Lavigne, Nick Alberga, and Jim "Boomer" Gordon.

== History ==
=== Home Ice (2005–2007) ===
First Logo of NHL Home Ice

Home Ice began in November 2005 as XM Radio Canada launched its line of channels on the XM platform. Home Ice actually began on the XM Satellite Radio United States platform before the official launch of XM Radio Canada. It was the first full-time channel launched by XM Radio Canada. Due to a licensing agreement with Sirius, XM was not permitted to use the NHL logo at launch, and instead created their own logo for the NHL package. Home Ice was a part of XM's NHL hockey package, with five other dedicated channels for game play-by-play. This enabled XM to air most NHL games. In addition, French language channel Radio Parallèle airs French play-by-play of the Montreal Canadiens and Ottawa Senators.

Home Ice concluded its first season on air the morning of June 20, 2006, when the Carolina Hurricanes won the Stanley Cup. Gametime aftermath show Ice Cap had an extended show to take calls from fans.

Home Ice continued on Channel 204 through the 2006–2007 season.

=== NHL Home Ice (2007–2013) ===
Final Logo of NHL Home Ice

On July 1, 2007, XM became the exclusive satellite radio home of the NHL and officially rebranded the Home Ice channel to NHL Home Ice. Beginning with the 2007-08 NHL season, XM carried the play-by-play of every regular season and playoff game.

Following the Sirius / XM merger, NHL Home Ice was added to Sirius on September 30, 2008 as part of its "Best of XM" package on channel 208. Despite being programmed by XM Canada, and with as their satellite counterparts still two separate entities.

On November 16, 2009, the afternoon show Power Play began simulcasting video live on the NHL Network, joining NHL Live, which on March 17, 2008, became the first satellite radio program to be simulcast in high definition.

=== SiriusXM NHL Network Radio (2013–present) ===
During the 2012–13 NHL lockout, the channel's name was changed from NHL Home Ice to SiriusXM NHL Network Radio.

On October 18, 2013, the station moved channels on XM from 92 to 211. The channel again shifted positions on July 17, 2014. They were Sirius 211 and XM 218.

In August 2015, the network switched to Channel 91 on both Sirius and XM Radio. The beginning of the 2015–2016 NHL season also brought a change in programming, with the Hockey This Morning and War Room shows being replaced with new content.
