= AMI-audio =

Canadian audio service intended for blind or partially sighted people

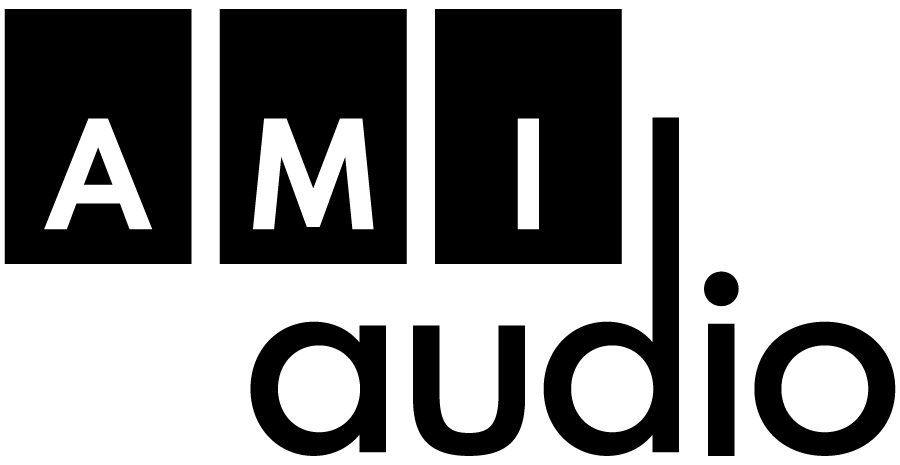
- Country: Canada
- Broadcast area: National
- Headquarters: Toronto, Ontario

Ownership
- Owner: Accessible Media Inc.
- Sister channels: AMI-tv

History
- Launched: December 1, 1990
- Former names: VoicePrint (1990–2012)

Links
- Website: AMI-audio

Availability

Streaming media
- Streaming MP3: High fidelity 256Kb audio stream (direct link); Web player

AMI-audio is a Canadian radio reading service operated by Accessible Media Inc. (AMI). Launched in 1990 as VoicePrint, the service primarily carries programs with readings of articles from print newspapers and magazines for the benefit of listeners who are visually impaired or illiterate. The service also carries AMI-produced spoken-word programming dealing with topics related to disabilities and accessibility.

AMI-audio is licensed by the Canadian Radio-television and Telecommunications Commission (CRTC) as a discretionary "must-carry" service; it must be carried on the lowest level of service by all licensed digital cable, satellite television, and IPTV providers in Canada. The service is also distributed via AMI's streaming service AMI+, with individual programs available as podcasts.

== History ==
The service was first launched in 1990 as VoicePrint, as a service of the non-profit National Broadcast Reading Service (NBRS). The CRTC licensed it as a "must-carry" service in 2001, meaning all digital cable and satellite providers must carry the service. Its programming is also carried via AMI's digital platforms, including the AMI+ streaming service.

In 2007, the NBRS filed an application for a new must-carry television specialty channel, "The Accessible Channel", which would broadcast all programming with closed captioning and described video (DV). The application was approved by the CRTC, and the channel launched in January 2009. In 2010, the organization was renamed Accessible Media Inc. (AMI) to reflect its new platforms. On March 5, 2012, VoicePrint was renamed AMI-audio to unify it with The Accessible Channel, which had been renamed AMI-tv.

== Programming ==
AMI-audio's schedule has long featured programs with readings of stories from print publications, voiced by professional broadcasters including Toronto Maple Leafs public address announcer Mike Ross, former CHUM-FM disc jockey Roger Ashby, and former CP24 reporter Corinne Van Dusen. Past presenters include former CTV National News anchor Lloyd Robertson.

Its current lineup includes programs featuring articles from The Globe and Mail, Maclean's, and The Walrus, as well as international publications such as The Guardian and The Washington Post.

The service also carries AMI-produced podcasts dealing with accessibility and disability-related topics, such as Reflections, an interview and conversation series featuring Ramya Amuthan, Kelly MacDonald, Joeita Gupta, Grant Hardy, Beth Deer and Nisreen Abdel-Majid, Disability Rights, and Wrongs: The David Lepodcast featuring lawyer and disability-rights activist David Lepofsky, the assistive technology program Double Tap, Audiobook Café which reviews audiobooks, and Para Sport Nation, co-hosted by Canadian Paralympic cyclist Nathan Clement.

== Previous logos ==
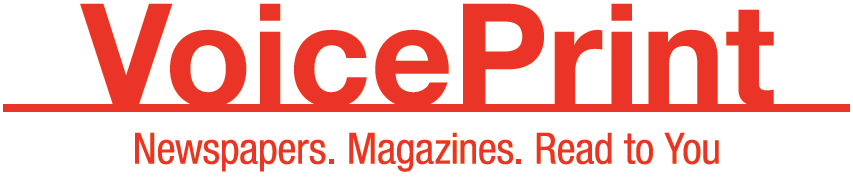
1990–2011

2011–2012

2012–present

== See also ==
- Canal M, a similar (but unaffiliated) service in the French language.
