= Rosie Awards =

Albertan film and television awards

- Country: Canada
- Presented by: AMPIA
- First award: 1974
- Website: http://www.ampia.org/

The Rosie Awards is the name given to the Alberta Film and Television Awards, presented annually by Alberta Media Production Industries Association (AMPIA). AMPIA is non-profit professional association that supports its members by encouraging the development of the film industry in the province of Alberta. There are 23 Class awards and 33 Craft categories. The first awards show was held in 1974.

== Categories ==
=== Class categories ===
- Best Documentary Series
- Best Documentary Under 30 Minutes
- Best Documentary Over 30 Minutes
- Best Dramatic Series
- Best Dramatic Feature Made-For-TV Movie
- Best Children's Program or Series
- Best News Feature
- Best Information or Lifestyle Series
- Best Television Commercial Under $50K
- Best Television Commercial Over $50K
- Best Public Service or Not-For-Profit Production
- Best Corporate Production
- Best Promotional Production
- Best Musical Program or Variety Program
- Best Music Video
- Best Fiction Web Series
- Best Web Series Non-Fiction
- Best Digital or Interactive Project
- Best Short Dramatic
- Best Short Non-Fiction
- Best Sports Event Production
- Best Production Reflecting Cultural Diversity
- Best Student Production

=== Craft categories ===
- Best Director (Drama Under 30 Minutes)
- Best Director (Drama Over 30 Minutes)
- Best Director (Non-Fiction Under 30 Minutes)
- Best Director (Non-Fiction Over 30 Minutes)
- Best Performance by an Alberta Actor
- Best Performance BY AN Alberta Actress
- Best Television Host
- Best Narrator
- Best Screenwriter (Drama Under 30 Minutes)
- Best Screenwriter (Drama Over 30 Minutes)
- Best Screenwriter (Non-Fiction Under 30 Minutes)
- Best Screenwriter (Non-Fiction Over 30 Minutes)
- Best Cinematographer (Drama Under 30 Minutes)
- Best Cinematographer (Drama Over 30 Minutes)
- Best Cinematographer (Non-Fiction Under 30 Minutes)
- Best Cinematographer (Non-Fiction Over 30 Minutes)
- Best Editor (Drama Under 30 Minutes)
- Best Editor (Drama Over 30 Minutes)
- Best Editor (Non-Fiction Under 30 Minutes)
- Best Editor (Non-Fiction Over 30 Minutes)
- Best Overall Sound (Drama Under 30 Minutes)
- Best Overall Sound (Drama Over 30 Minutes)
- Best Overall Sound (Non-Fiction Under 30 Minutes)
- Best Overall Sound (Non-Fiction Over 30 Minutes)
- Best Original Musical Score (Drama Under 30 Minutes)
- Best Original Musical Score (Drama Over 30 Minutes)
- Best Original Musical Score (Non-Fiction Under 30 Minutes)
- Best Original Musical Score (Non-Fiction Over 30 Minutes)
- Best Production Designer/Art Director
- Best Costume Designer
- Best Make-Up & Hair Artist(s)
- Best Visual Effects
- Best Animator/Motion Graphic Artist(s)

== See also ==
- Canadian television awards
