= AMI-tv =

Canadian specialty TV channel

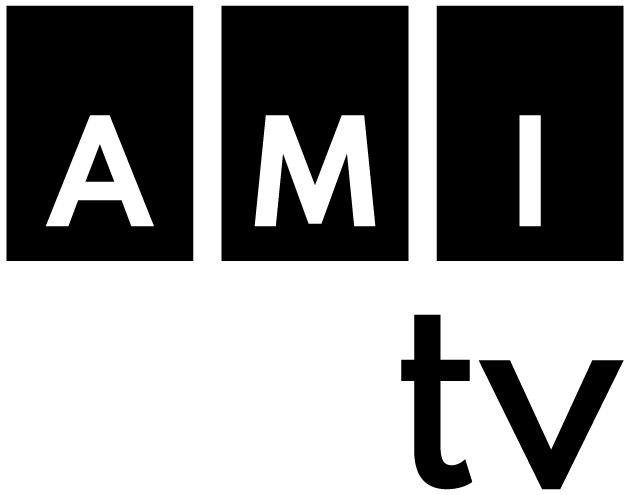
- Country: Canada
- Broadcast area: National
- Headquarters: Toronto, Ontario

Programming
- Picture format: 480i (SDTV); 1080i (HDTV)

Ownership
- Owner: Accessible Media Inc.
- Sister channels: AMI-audio; AMI-télé

History
- Launched: January 29, 2009, 16 years ago
- Former names: The Accessible Channel (2009–2012)

Links
- Website: AMI-tv

AMI-tv is a Canadian, English-language, digital cable specialty channel. Owned by Accessible Media Inc. (AMI), it primarily broadcasts programming relating to accessibility and disabilities. All programming is broadcast with accommodations for those who are visually or hearing impaired, offering described video (DV) on the primary audio track, and closed captioning.

It was launched on January 29, 2009, as The Accessible Channel (TAC), by the National Broadcast Reading Service (now AMI), the non-profit organization that operates the radio reading service VoicePrint (now AMI-audio). Initially, most of AMI-tv's programming consisted of programming sublicensed from other Canadian broadcasters and broadcast in its "open" format, including entertainment programs, and special news and sports broadcasts. By the 2020s, the bulk of AMI-tv's programs have been original productions dealing with accessibility and disabilities, including factual, reality, and entertainment programming.

AMI-tv is licensed by the Canadian Radio-television and Telecommunications Commission (CRTC) as a discretionary "must-carry" service; it must be carried on the lowest level of service by all licensed digital cable, satellite television, and IPTV providers in Canada. On December 16, 2014, AMI launched a French-language version of the network, AMI-télé, under a second Category A licence.

== History ==
=== Licensing ===
On March 27, 2007, the CRTC held a public hearing to consider twelve applications from applicants requesting mandatory distribution for their television services in the basic package of all digital television service providers in Canada. Among those twelve applicants was the National Broadcast Reading Service (NBRS), a non-profit organization that operates the reading service VoicePrint, which is also a "must-carry" service. The NBRS proposed a service known as The Accessible Channel (TAC), a 24-hour English-language channel that would be devoted to providing programming of interest to those who are blind or visually impaired, in a format accessible to those individuals.

The NBRS believed that visually impaired viewers had difficulties locating television programming with described video due to a number of factors, such as the small amount of described programming on Canadian television at the time (an estimated 3%) and difficulties accessing the second audio program (SAP) on which described video is typically carried (either due to a lack of knowledge, or television service providers being unable to correctly deliver SAP feeds to subscribers). As such, the NBRS proposed TAC to be a consistent location for accessible programming; TAC planned to broadcast all of its programming in an "open format", with described video occupying the primary audio track—allowing viewers otherwise unable to use SAP to listen to programming with described video. In conjunction with the channel, the NBRS also planned to maintain online listings of programs with described video across all Canadian broadcasters.

On July 24, 2007, the CRTC approved the NBRS's application to operate The Accessible Channel; the commission recognized (as per an earlier report) that "television is a key tool for social integration for all citizens, including persons with disabilities" and that the low amount of described content on television (along with the technical issues NBRS cited) made it difficult for the visually impaired to find accessible television programming. The commission also considered TAC to be complementary with the Broadcasting Act, which called for the introduction of accessible programming into Canada's broadcasting system as resources become available.

=== Launch ===
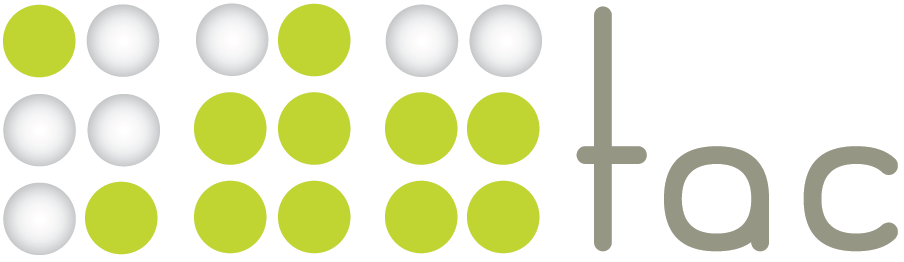
The channel's original logo, which depicted its initials "TAC" in a stylized form of braille. The logo was later modified to more closely resemble actual braille lettering.

At a gala coinciding with the United Nations' International Day of Persons with Disabilities on December 3, 2008, the NBRS announced that The Accessible Channel would officially launch in January 2009. The organization also announced that TAC would carry closed captioning on all of its programming: while the CRTC's standard conditions of licence for digital services at the time only mandated that 90% of programming be captioned, the NBRS felt that committing to caption all of its programming was consistent with its goal to make TAC an "inclusive" service. The Accessible Channel subsequently launched on January 29, 2009.

To reflect its expansion beyond VoicePrint, the National Broadcast Reading Service was renamed Accessible Media Inc. (AMI) in 2010. On January 30, 2012, as part of an effort to unify AMI's services under one brand, TAC was renamed AMI-tv. VoicePrint followed suit on March 5, 2012, becoming AMI-audio.

On December 4, 2012, AMI-tv launched a high definition feed on the MTS Ultimate TV service in Manitoba.

=== French version ===
In January 2013, when the CRTC opened a new round of applications for must-carry channels, AMI submitted an application for a French-language sister channel of AMI-tv known as AMI-tv Français, which would have a similar format to its English-language counterpart. AMI justified the need for the channel by noting that the three provinces which host the majority of Canada's francophone population—New Brunswick, Ontario, and Quebec—had above-average levels of vision loss and other vision-related conditions. On August 8, 2013, the CRTC approved the application; the commission recognized that given the impact of AMI-tv's English service, a French service would have an equivalent impact on Canada's francophone community.

The service launched on December 16, 2014, as AMI-télé.

== Programming ==
AMI-tv primarily carries programming dealing with accessibility- and disability-related topics, including programs highlighting Canadians with disabilities. Original series and specials commissioned by the network have included the documentary A Whole New Light, which focused on Canada's contributions to the research of vision loss, Milestones of Champions: The Journeys of Canada's Paralympians, focusing on the stories of notable Canadian athletes in the Paralympic Games, Level Playing Field (a disability sports newsmagazine hosted by Canadian Para ice hockey player Greg Westlake, the cooking show Four Senses, Employable Me, You Can't Ask That (a co-production with the CBC and the Australian Broadcasting Corporation), news comedy The Squeaky Wheel: Canada, Low Vision Moments, Get Hooked (a co-production with OutTV), and the stand-up comedy anthology All Access Comedy. Audio description is integrated into the programs' main dialogue and narration.

Initially, AMI-tv carried a general entertainment format with acquired programming broadcast in its "open" format, supplied in conjunction with other major Canadian broadcasters such as the CBC and Bell Media; a smaller portion of programming was sourced from foreign broadcasters and studios. Under the channel's original license terms, no more than 33% of its programming could be supplied by a single broadcaster, and no more than 50% of its programming could contain audio descriptions produced by AMI. Until the launch of the dedicated channel AMI-télé, it also aired four hours a week of French-language programming in the same format. This mandate would later become redundant due to the increased amount of DV programming carried across Canadian broadcasters: in September 2019, the CRTC mandated that specialty networks owned by vertically integrated companies must make all prime time entertainment programming available with described video.

=== News and sports ===
AMI-tv has collaborated with other Canadian broadcasters to simulcast events on the network with open described video. In conjunction with CBC Television, the network provided audio descriptions and simulcasts of coverage of events such as the wedding of Prince William and Catherine Middleton, the 2011 federal election, the 2011 Gemini Awards, Canada Day festivities in Ottawa in 2012, and the 32nd Genie Awards.

In conjunction with coverage of the games carried by CTV and Rogers properties, AMI-tv also offered coverage of the 2012 Summer Paralympics, including simulcasts of daily highlight shows with described video, and a daily program featuring interviews with athletes. The latter was hosted by AMI reporters Carrie Anton (who was a member of Canada's gold medal-winning goalball team at the 2000 Summer Paralympics) and Gary Steeves, both of whom are blind. AMI-tv's involvement in the Paralympics continued for the 2014 Winter Paralympics in Sochi, this time in conjunction with the Canadian Paralympic Committee and CBC Sports.

In September 2012, AMI-tv partnered with Sportsnet to broadcast three Toronto Blue Jays Major League Baseball games with described video provided by Sportsnet 590 correspondent Sam Cosentino, which included additional commentary such as explanations of on-screen graphics. Blue Jays president Paul Beeston praised AMI's involvement, stating that "to our knowledge, we are the first sports organization to have our games provided through this revolutionary approach to accommodating the needs of the blind and low-vision community." AMI-tv Blue Jays coverage was expanded for the 2013 season, with Cosentino joined by veteran sportscaster Jim Van Horne.
