= Hart (surname) =

Hart is an English, German, Dutch, Jewish (Ashkenazic), French and Irish surname. Notable people and characters with the surname Hart include:

== A ==
- Aaron Hart (rabbi) (1670–1756), First chief rabbi of Great Britain
- Aaron Hart (businessman) (1724–1800), Canadian businessman
- Abraham Hart (1810–1885), American businessman
- Abraham van der Hart (1757–1820), Dutch architect
- Adam Hart, English scientist, author and broadcaster
- Adolphus Hart (1814–1879), Canadian lawyer and author
- Adrian Liddell Hart (1922–1991), British Royal Navy officer and politician
- Aiysha Hart (born 1988), English actress and screenwriter
- Al Hart (1927–2016), American radio broadcaster
- Alan Hart (writer) (1942–2018), British author and reporter
- Alan Hart (television executive) (1935–2021), British television executive
- Alan Hart (footballer) (born 1956), English footballer
- Alan L. Hart (1890–1962), Transgender American physician and writer
- Albert Bushnell Hart (1854–1943), American historian and scholar
- Alden Hart (1860–1947), American businessman and politician
- Alexander Hart (1839–1911), Confederate States Army officer
- Alexander Hart (floorball) (born 1985), Swedish sportsman
- Alfaretta Hart (1860–1951), First Policewoman in Muncie, Indiana
- Alfred A. Hart (1816–1908), American photographer
- Alfred S. Hart (1904–1979), American businessman and banker
- Alice Hart (1848–1931), British philanthropist, artist, and businesswoman
- Allie Carroll Hart (1913–2003), American historian
- Alphonso Hart (1830–1910), American politician
- Alvin N. Hart (1804–1874), American politician
- Alvin Youngblood Hart (born 1963), American singer
- Amy Hart (singer), American singer-songwriter
- Amy Hart (TV personality) (born 1992), English media personality
- Andrew Hart (runner) (born 1969), British athlete
- Andrew Hart (rugby league) (born 1976), Australian rugby league footballer
- Andrew Searle Hart (1811–1890), Anglo-Irish mathematician and Vice-Provost of Trinity College Dublin
- Andro Hart (died 1621), Scottish printer
- Angie Hart (born 1972), Australian singer
- Ann Weaver Hart (born 1948), American college president
- Anne Hart (Canadian author) (1935–2019), Canadian author
- Anne Hart (actress) (1933–2023), English actress, dancer, singer and comedian
- Annie Hart (musician), American singer-songwriter
- Anthony Hart (1754–1831), British lawyer
- Antonio Hart (born 1968), American jazz saxophonist
- Archibald C. Hart (1873–1935), American politician
- Arthur Hart (footballer, born 1917) (1917–1981), Australian rules footballer
- Arthur Hart (footballer, born 1905) (1905–1989), Australian rules footballer
- Asher Hart (born 1997), English cricketer
- Ashley Hart (model) (born 1988), Australian model
- Aubrey Hart (1893–1958), Australian rules footballer
- Augustus L. Hart (1849–1901), politician

== B ==
- B. H. Liddell Hart (1895–1970), British historian and military theorist
- Barry Hart (Academics) (born 1940), Australian environmental scientist and academic
- Ben Hart (Australian footballer) (born 1974), Australian rules footballer, born 1974
- Ben Hart (magician) (born 1990), English magician
- Ben Hart (footballer, born 2000), English association football player
- Benjamin Hart (born 1977), British actor
- Benjamin Hart (businessman) (1779–1855), Canadian businessman
- Bernard Hart (1879–1966), English physician and psychiatrist
- Bertha Hart, American mathematician
- Beth Hart (born 1972), American blues rock musician
- Bethany Hart (born 1977), American hammer thrower
- Betsy Hart (born c.1963), American journalist
- Betty Hart (1927–2012), American education researcher
- Bill Hart (pitcher) (1865–1936), American baseball player
- Bill Hart (infielder) (1913-1968), American baseball player
- Bill Hart (footballer) (1923–1990), English footballer
- Billy Hart (born 1940), American jazz drummer and educator
- Billy Hart (baseball) (1866–1944), American baseball player
- Bo Hart (born 1976), American baseball player
- Bob Hart (bassist), American musician
- Bob Hart (umpire) (1879–1937), American baseball umpire
- Bobbi Jo Hart, Canadian documentary filmmaker
- Bobby Hart (American football) (born 1994), American football player
- Bonnie Hart, Intersex activist
- Brad Hart, American attorney and politician
- Bradley Hart, Canadian contemporary artist
- Bret Hart (born 1957), Canadian professional wrestler
- Brian Hart (1936–2014), British racing driver and engineer
- Brian Hart (footballer) (born 1959), English footballer
- Britain Hart (born 1990), American boxer and bare-knuckle boxer
- Bruce Hart (wrestler) (born 1950), Canadian professional wrestler
- Bruce Hart (songwriter) (1938–2006), American songwriter and screenwriter

== C ==
- C. W. M. Hart (1905–1976), Australian anthropologist
- Callie Hart (born 1983), British romance and fantasy author
- Callum Hart (born 1985), Welsh footballer
- Cam Hart (born 2000), American football player
- Carey Hart (born 1975), American freestyle motocross, motorcycle and off-road truck racer
- Carl Hart (born 1966), American neuroscientist
- Carmen Hart (born 1983/1984), American pornographic film actress
- Carole Hart (1943–2018), American writer and television producer
- Carolyn Hart (born 1936), American mystery author
- Carter Hart (born 1998), Canadian ice hockey player
- Cecil Hart (1883–1940), Canadian ice hockey coach
- Cecilia Hart (1948–2016), American actress
- Cees 't Hart (born 1958), Dutch businessman
- Celia Hart (1962–2008), Cuban physicist and writer
- Charles C. Hart (1878–1956), American diplomat
- Charles E. Hart (1900–1991), United States Army general
- Charles H. Hart (1866–1934), American Mormon leader
- Charles Hart (lyricist) (born 1961), English lyricist, librettist and songwriter
- Charles Hart (actor) (1625–1683), 17th-century English actor
- Charles Henry Hart (1847–1918), American art historian, academic administrator
- Charles J. Hart (1896–1971), American football coach
- Charles Walter Hart (1872–1937), American engineer, inventor, and businessman
- Chris Hart (musician) (born 1984), American singer
- Chris Hart IV (born 1968), American politician
- Chris Hart (Canadian football) (born 1988), American football player
- Chris R. Hart (born 1972), American politician
- Christina Hart (born 1949), Actress, director, producer
- Christine Hart (born 1950), Canadian politician
- Christopher A. Hart (born 1965), American lawyer, government official, and pilot
- Christopher Hart (actor) (born 1961), Canadian actor and magician
- Christopher Hart (novelist) (born 1965), English novelist and journalist
- Christopher K. Hart, American businessman
- Claudia Hart (born 1955), American artist
- Clay Hart (1942–2022), American singer and guitarist
- Clifford Hart (born 1961), American diplomat
- Clinton Hart (born 1977), American football player
- Clyde Hart (1934–2025), American track and field coach
- Clyde Hart (pianist) (1911–1945), American jazz pianist and arranger
- Cor van der Hart (1928–2006), Dutch footballer
- Corey Hart (singer) (born 1962), Canadian musician
- Corey Hart (baseball) (born 1982), American baseball player
- Craig Hart, American politician
- Creighton C. Hart (1906–1993), American philatelist
- Cyril Hart (forester) (1913–2009), English forester and historian
- Cyril Hart (politician), Nigerian politician
- Cyril Roy Hart (born 1923), Amateur historian of Anglo-Saxon England

== D ==
- D. G. Hart (born 1956), American historian
- Daniel Anthony Hart (1927–2008), American Catholic bishop
- Daniel Hart (musician) (born 1976), American musician and composer
- Danny Hart (footballer) (born 1989), English footballer
- Danny Hart (cyclist) (born 1991), British downhill mountain biker
- Darel Hart (born 1964), Australian rules footballer
- Daryl Hart (American football) (born 1961), American football player
- Dave Hart (1925–2009), American football player, coach, and college athletics administrator
- David Ananda Hart (1954–2024), British theologian
- David Bentley Hart (born 1965), American philosopher and theologian
- David Berry Hart (1851–1920), Scottish gynaecological surgeon and academic
- David Hart (footballer) (born 1964), Australian rules footballer
- David Hart (political activist) (1944–2011), British political activist
- David Hart (actor) (born 1954), American actor and singer
- David Hart (water polo) (born 1951), Canadian water polo player
- David Liebe Hart (born 1955), American entertainer
- David Montgomery Hart (1927–2001), American anthropologist
- Dean Evan Hart (born 1957), American optometrist
- Dean Hart (1954-1990), Canadian professional wrestler, amateur wrestler and referee
- Dee Hart (born 1992), American football player
- Deirdre Hart (born 1975), New Zealand geographer
- Denis Hart (born 1941), Catholic archbishop of Melbourne, Victoria, Australia
- Derek Hart (1925–1986), British broadcaster
- Derek Hart (American football) (born 1992), American football player
- Dian Hart, American singer
- Diana Hart (born 1963), Canadian professional wrestling manager
- Diane Hart (1926–2002), English actress
- Dianne Hart (born 1955), American politician
- Dick Hart (athlete) (1927–1991), American long-distance runner
- Dick Hart (golfer) (1935–2013), American golfer
- Dick Hart (American football) (born 1943), American football player
- Dick Hart (footballer) (1881–1934), Australian rules footballer
- Dick Hart (painter) (1920–1990), British painter
- Dolores Hart (born 1938), American nun and actress
- Don Hart (1930–2018), Australian rules footballer
- Donald Purple Hart (1986–1994), Hawaiian bishop
- Donnie Hart (born 1990), American baseball player
- Doris Hart (1925–2015), American tennis player
- Dorothy Hart (1922–2004), American actress
- Doug Hart (1939–2020), American football player
- Douglas Hart (born 1961), British musician
- Dudley Hart (born 1968), American professional golfer

== E ==
- Ed Hart (1887–1956), American football player
- Eddie Hart (sprinter) (born 1949), American sprinter
- Eddie Hart (Australian footballer) (1922–1995), Australian rules footballer
- Edward Hart (soccer) (1903–1974), American soccer player
- Edward Hart (settler), early settler of the American Colonies
- Edward Hart (goldsmith), Scottish goldsmith in the time of James VI of Scotland
- Edward Hart (physician) (1911–1986), Scottish physician
- Edward J. Hart (1893–1961), American politician
- Edward L. Hart (1916–2008), American poet
- Edward W. Hart (1852–1924), American politician
- Edwin B. Hart (1874–1953), American biochemist
- Edwina Hart (born 1957), British politician
- Elijah Carson Hart (1854–1929), American politician
- Elizabeth Anna Hart (1822–1890), British poet and novelist
- Elizur K. Hart (1841–1893), American politician
- Ellen Hart (born 1949), American novelist
- Emanuel B. Hart (1809–1897), American politician
- Emerson Hart (born 1969), American musician
- Emilia Hart, British-Australian novelist
- Emily Hart (born 1986), American actress
- Emma Hart (computer scientist) (born 1967), English computer scientist
- Emma Hart (artist) (born 1974), English artist
- Ephraim Hart (New York politician) (1774–1839), American politician
- Ephraim Hart (1747–1825), American merchant
- Ericka Hart (born 1986), American sex educator, model, and professor
- Erin Hart (born 1958), American author of crime fiction
- Ernest Hart (medical journalist) (1835–1898), English medical journalist
- Ernie Hart (1910–1985), American comic-book writer and artist
- Ernie Hart (footballer, born 1902) (1902–1954), English footballer
- Ernie Hart (Australian footballer) (1912–2001), Australian rules footballer
- Esther Hart (singer) (born 1970), Dutch singer
- Esther Hastings Hart (1862–1940), entomologist and scientific illustrator
- Eugene Hart (active 1969–1982), American middleweight boxer
- Eustace Hart (1907–1972), Indian-born English cricketer
- Eva Hart (1905–1996), British survivor of RMS Titanic
- Evelyn Hart (born 1956), Canadian ballerina
- Ezekiel Hart (1770–1843), Canadian Jewish entrepreneur and politician

== F ==
- Ferdinand Hart (1893–1937), Czech actor
- Florian Hart (born 1990), Austrian footballer
- Frances Noyes Hart (1890–1943), American writer
- Francis Dudley Hart (1909–2004), British rheumatologist
- Frania Hart (1890–1943), Polish-born French painter
- Frank Hart (politician) (1860–1945), Tasmanian politician
- Frank Hart (athlete) (1856–1908), African-American athlete
- Franklin A. Hart (1894–1967), United States Marine Corps general
- Fred Hart (engineer) (1914–2008), British automotive engineer
- Fred J. Hart (businessman) (1888–1976), American alternative medicine practitioner
- Fred J. Hart (politician) (1908–1983), American politician and businessman
- Freddie Hart (1926–2018), American country music singer-songwriter
- Frederick Hart (sculptor) (1943–1999), American sculptor
- Frederick Hart (politician) (1836–1915), Member of the Queensland Legislative Assembly & Queensland Legislative Council
- Fritz Hart (1874–1949), British composer

== G ==
- G. Arnold Hart (1913–2001), Canadian banker
- Gabriel Hart (born 1978), American director
- Gaétan Hart (born 1953), Canadian boxer
- Gary Hart (born 1936), American politician
- Gary Hart (wrestler) (1942–2008), American professional wrestler and manager
- Gary Hart (footballer) (born 1976), English footballer
- Gary K. Hart (1943–2022), American politician
- Gene Hart (1931–1999), American sports broadcaster
- George D. Hart (1846–1932), American politician
- George Hart (politician) (1820–1895), New Zealand politician
- George Hart (physicist), American physicist
- George Hart (rugby union) (1909–1944), New Zealand rugby union player
- George Hart (cricketer) (1902–1987), English cricketer
- George Hart (Egyptologist) (1945–2021), British Egyptologist
- George Hart (luthier) (1839–1891), English musicologist
- George L. Hart (born 1942), American linguist, Tamil studies researcher and translator
- George Luzerne Hart Jr. (1905–1984), American judge
- George Michener Hart (1919–2008), American historian
- George Vaughan Hart (British Army officer) (1752–1832), British soldier and politician
- George Vaughan Hart (academic) (1841–1912), Irish lawyer and Regius Professor
- George W. Hart (born 1955), American geometer
- George Z. Hart (1924–2013), American politician
- Gerry Hart (1948–2023), Canadian ice hockey player
- Gerry Hart (American football) (1935–2011), American football coach
- Gertrude Hart (1873–1965), Australian writer and poet
- Giles Hart (1949–2005), British activist
- Gillian Hart (born 1946), American geographer
- Gina Hart, British comics artist
- Gizzy Hart (1904–1964), Canadian ice hockey player
- Glen Hart (born 1946), Canadian politician
- Glenn Hart, Canadian politician
- Gordon Hart (1919–2009), Australian rugby league footballer
- Gordon L. S. Hart (1924–2010), Canadian politician
- Graeme Hart (born 1955), New Zealand businessman
- Graham Hart (1906–1974), Australian politician and judge
- Graham Hart (civil servant) (born 1940), British civil servant
- Grant Hart (1961–2017), American musician
- Grayson Hart (born 1988), New Zealand rugby union player
- Greg Hart, English guitarist
- Greg Hart (cricketer) (born 1971), New Zealand cricketer
- Gregg Hart (born 1959), American politician
- Gus Hart (1898–1965), NZ rugby union player

== H ==
- H. C. Hart, American drum major
- H. L. A. Hart (1907–1992), British legal philosopher
- Hannah Hart (born 1986), American internet personality, comedian, author, and actress
- Harold Hart (born 1952), American football player
- Harold Hart (cricketer) (1889–1953), Australian cricketer
- Harriet Russell Hart (1878-1958), American politician
- Harry Hart (athlete) (1905–1979), South African athlete
- Harry Hart (footballer) (1926–2012), English footballer
- Harvey Hart (1928–1989), Canadian film and television director
- Hattie Hart (c. 1900 – after 1946), American Memphis blues singer and songwriter
- Heather Hart (born 1975), American visual artist
- Heber Hart (1865–1948), English judge and jurist
- Helen Hart (author) (born 1965), British children's writer
- Helen Hart (plant pathologist) (1900–1971), American academic
- Helen Hart (suffragist) (1839-1908), British Australian suffragist, lecturer, and preacher
- Hendrik Hart (1935–2021), Dutch-Canadian philosopher
- Henry Chichester Hart (1847–1908), Anglo-Irish botanist, explorer, and editor
- Henry George Hart (1808–1878), British Army officer and author of Hart's Army List
- Henry Hart (author) (born 1954), Biographer and 17th Virginia Poet Laureate
- Henry Hart (Royal Navy officer) (1781–1856), British naval officer and diplomat
- Henry Hart (musician) (1839–1915), American singer
- Henry Hart (soldier) (1566–1637), Anglo-Irish soldier and landowner
- Henry Hart (died c. 1578) (1531–1578), English politician
- Henry M. Hart Jr. (1904–1969), American legal scholar
- Herbert Hart (general) (1882–1968), Officer in the New Zealand Military Forces
- Herbert Hart (cricketer) (1859–1895), English cricketer
- Herbert L. Hart (1897–1988), American college football player and coach
- Horace Hart (1840–1916), English printer and biographer
- Horace Hart (footballer) (1894–1975), English footballer
- Hornell Hart (1888–1967), American sociologist and parapsychologist
- Howard Hart (1940–2017), American Central Intelligence Agency officer
- Hub Hart (1878–1960), American baseball player
- Hubbard L. Hart (1827–1895), American businessman
- Hunter Hart (1897–2000), Scottish footballer and manager

== I ==
- Ian Hart (born 1964), English actor
- Ian Hart (neurologist) (1958–2008), British neurologist
- Irving Hart (1851–1927), American politician
- Isaiah Hart (1792–1861), Founder of Jacksonville, Florida
- Israel Hart (1835–1911), British merchant and Liberal Party politician

== J ==
- J. B. Hart, American football player and coach
- J'Tia Hart (born 1981), Nuclear Engineer and reality television participant
- Jack Hart (politician) (born 1961), American politician
- Jack Hart (rugby union) (born 1998), South African rugby union player
- Jada Hart (born 1998), American tennis player
- James D. Hart (1911–1990), American literary scholar
- James Hart (vocalist) (born 1979), American singer
- James Hart (rugby union) (born 1991), Irish rugby union player
- James Hart (Australian politician) (1825–1873), Australian politician
- James Hart (police officer) (1947–2024), British police commissioner
- James Hart (Ontario politician) (1820–1898), Canadian politician
- James Hart (minister) (1663–1729), Scottish minister
- James Hart (physician) (died 1639), Scottish physician
- James Hart (artist), British illustrator
- James L. Hart (born 1944), American politician
- James McDougal Hart (1828–1901), British-American painter
- James Morgan Hart (1839–1916), American philologist and translator
- James P. Hart (1904–1987), American judge
- James V. Hart (born 1947), American screenwriter and author
- Jamie Hart (cricketer) (born 1975), English cricketer
- Jane Briggs Hart (1921–2015), American aviator
- Jane Hart (artist) (born 1958), American curator, gallerist and artist
- Jane Hart (writer) (1922–2006), American writer
- Jane K. Hart, British geographer and academic
- Jane Sherron De Hart (born 1936), American historian
- Janice Hart (born 1955), American politician
- Jarrett Hart (born 1980), British professional basketball player
- Jason Hart (basketball) (born 1978), American basketball player and coach
- Jason Hart (baseball) (born 1977), American baseball player & coach
- Jason Hart (jockey), Scottish jockey
- Jason Hart (racing driver) (born 1976), American racing driver
- Jay Hart (set decorator), American set decorator
- Jay Hart (footballer) (born 1990), English professional footballer
- Jeff Hart (gridiron football) (born 1953), American gridiron football player
- Jeff Hart (golfer) (born 1960), American professional golfer
- Jeffrey A. Hart (born 1947), American political scientist
- Jeffrey Hart (1930–2019), American cultural critic
- Jenifer Hart (1914–2005), British civil servant and historian
- Jennifer Marianne Hart (1916–1997), Scottish women's rights activist
- Jenny Hart (born 1972), American artist
- Jerome T. Hart (1932–1995), American politician
- Jerran Hart (born 1991), British speedway rider
- Jesse Hart (born 1989), American boxer
- Jessica Hart (model) (born 1986), Australian model
- Jim Hart (American football) (born 1944), American football player
- Jim Hart (baseball manager) (1855–1919), American baseball executive and manager
- Jim Hart (artist) (born 1952), Canadian sculptor
- Jim Hart (British Columbia politician) (born 1955), Canadian politician
- Jim Hart (Ontario politician), Canadian politician and civil servant
- Jim Hart (musician) (born 1983), British jazz musician
- Jim Ray Hart (1941–2016), American baseball player
- Jimmy Hart (born 1944), American musician, professional wrestling manager, and sports businessman
- Jimmy Hart (baseball) (1875-1926), American baseball player
- Joan Hart (sprinter) (1925–2006), New Zealand sprinter
- Joan Hart (actress), Canadian actress
- Joe Hart (born 1987), English footballer
- Joe Hart (politician) (1944–2022), American politician
- Joel Hart (doctor) (1784–1842), American physician
- Joel Tanner Hart (1810–1877), American sculptor
- John De Hart (1727–1795), American judge
- John E. Hart (1824–1863), United States Navy officer
- John Fraser Hart (1924–2024), American geographer
- John Hart (baseball) (born 1948), American baseball executive and manager
- John Hart (New Jersey politician) (1711–1779), American Founding Father and politician
- John Hart (South Australian colonist) (1809–1873), Australian politician
- John Hart (actor) (1917–2009), American actor
- John Hart (journalist) (born 1932), American journalist
- John Hart (colonial administrator) (died 1740), British colonial administrator
- John Hart (doctor) (1751–1836), American surgeon
- John Hart (Canadian politician) (1879–1957), Canadian politician
- John Hart (rugby union coach) (born 1946), NZ rugby union player & coach
- John Hart (author) (born 1995), American author of thriller novels
- John Hart Jr. (1848–1881), Australian politician
- John Hart (speedway rider) (born 1941), British former motorcycle speedway rider
- John Hart (soldier) (1706–1777), American soldier
- John Hart (producer), American film and theater producer
- John Hart (rugby union, born 1982), English rugby union player
- John Hart (spelling reformer) (died 1574), English educator and spelling reformer
- John Hart (classicist) (1936–2011), English classics master at Malvern College
- John Hart (dancer) (1921–2015), British ballet dancer
- John Hart (Jesuit) (died 1586), English Jesuit
- John Hart (Tasmanian politician) (1829–1896), Australian politician
- John Hart (rugby union, born 1928) (1928–2007), Scotland international rugby union player
- John Hart (RAF officer) (1916–2019), RAF pilot
- John M. Hart (1866–1955), American politician
- John P. Hart (born 1960), American attorney
- John Seely Hart (1810–1877), American writer
- John Shadrach Hart (1838–1912), Australian politician
- John W. Hart (1833–1907), American Civil War soldier from Maryland
- Johnny Hart (1931–2007), American cartoonist
- Johnny Hart (English footballer) (1928–2018), English footballer and manager
- Johnny Hart (Scottish footballer), Scottish footballer and coach
- Johnny Hart (Australian footballer) (1888–1966), Australian rules footballer
- Jon Hart (born 1969), Australian rugby union player
- Jonathan Hart (poet) (born 1956), Canadian poet, literary scholar and historian
- Jonathan Hart (bishop) (born 1953), Liberian Episcopalian bishop
- Jonn Hart (born 1989), American musician
- Jordan Hart (born 1995), Polish badminton player
- Joseph Binns Hart (1794–1844), English organist and composer
- Joseph C. Hart (1798–1855), American writer
- Joseph Hart (1712–1768), British Calvinist minister
- Joseph Hart (entertainer) (1861–1921), American songwriter
- Joseph Hart (artist) (born 1976), American artist
- Joseph Hubert Hart (1931–2023), American Roman Catholic prelate
- Joseph J. Hart (1859–1926), American politician
- Josephine Hart (1942–2011), Irish writer
- Josephine L. Hart (born 1943), American judge
- Josh Hart (born 1995), American basketball player
- Josh Hart (racer) (born 1983), American drag racer and entrepreneur
- Josh Hart (baseball) (born 1994), American baseball player
- Judith Hart (1924–1991), British politician
- Judson G. Hart (1842–1913), American farmer and politician
- Julia Hart (wrestler) (born 2001), American professional wrestler
- Julia Hart (filmmaker) (born 1982), American filmmaker
- Julian Deryl Hart (1894–1980), President of Duke University from 1960 to '63
- Jürgen Hart (1942–2002), East German music teacher and cabaret performer

== K ==
- Karla Hart, Australian radio presenter
- Katrina Hart (born 1990), British paralympic sprinter
- Kausalya Hart (born 1930), Indian academic
- Keith Hart (wrestler) (born 1951), Canadian professional wrestler
- Keith Hart (anthropologist) (1943–2025), British anthropologist
- Kelsey Hart, American singer-songwriter
- Kevin Hart (born 1979), American comedian and actor
- Kevin Hart (poet) (born 1954), Anglo-Australian theologian, philosopher and poet
- Kevin Hart (baseball) (born 1982), American baseball player
- Kevin Hart (footballer) (1927–2016), Australian rules footballer
- Kim Hart (born 1960), New Zealand singer-songwriter
- Kyle Hart (born 1992), American baseball player

== L ==
- Larry Hart (athlete) (born 1946), American hammer thrower
- Larry Hart (American football) (born 1987), American football player
- Larry Hart (politician), American politician
- Lauren Hart (American pop singer) (born 1967), American singer
- Lauren Hart (heavy metal musician) (born 1986), American musician
- Lawrence Hart (American football) (born 1976), American football player
- Lawrence Hart (poet) (1901–1996), American poet
- Leigh Hart (born 1970), New Zealand comedian, radio announcer
- Lenie 't Hart (born 1941), Dutch animal rights activist
- Lenny Hart (1919–1975), American drummer
- Leo Hart (born 1949), American football player
- Leon Hart (1928–2002), American football player
- Leon Hart (American football, born 1951) (born 1951), American football coach
- Les Hart (1917–1996), English footballer and manager
- Les Hart (politician) (1909–2002), Australian politician
- Letitia Bonnet Hart (1866–1953), American painter
- Libby Hart (born 1971), Australian poet
- Libby Hart (sport shooter) (born 2007), British sport shooter
- Linda Hart, American actress, singer and musician
- Lois Hart (born 1950), American journalist
- Lorenz Hart (1895–1943), American lyricist
- Louis F. Hart (1862–1929), 9th governor of Washington
- Luke E. Hart (1880–1964), 10th Supreme Knight of the Knights of Columbus

== M ==
- Maarten 't Hart (born 1944), Dutch writer
- Magnus Hart (born 1996), Chinese-born Norwegian footballer
- Mamrie Hart (born 1983), American comedian, actress, writer, and performer
- Marcel Hart (1909–1969), French Polynesian politician
- Maria Hart (1923–2012), American actress
- Marion Rice Hart (1891–1990), American writer and aviator
- Mark Hart (born 1953), American musician
- Mark Hart (politician) (born 1968), American politician, paramedic, and firefighter
- Mark Hart (actor) (1873–1950), American musical theatre actor
- Martha Hart (born 1966), Canadian philanthropist
- Martin Hart (born 1927), English cricketer
- Marvin Hart (1876–1931), American boxer
- Mary Hart (born 1950), American television personality
- Mary Theresa Hart (1872–1942), American artist
- Matt Hart (wrestler) (born 1993), Canadian professional wrestler
- Matthew Hart (born 1972), New Zealand cricketer
- Matthew J. Hart, American businessman
- Max Hart (racing driver) (born 2001), Irish racing driver
- Megan Hart (born 1971), American novelist
- Megan Marie Hart (born 1983), American opera singer
- Melissa Hart (politician) (born 1962), American lawyer and politician
- Melissa Hart (judge) (1969–2026), American judge
- Melissa Hart (actress) (born 1942), American actress, singer, and teacher
- Melissa Joan Hart (born 1976), American actress, director and producer
- Merwin K. Hart (1881–1962), American politician
- Michael H. Hart (born 1932), American astrophysicist and white separatist
- Michael Hart (mayor) (1814–1878), New Zealand politician
- Michael Hart (Australian politician) (born 1960), Australian politician
- Michael Hart (rower) (born 1951), British rower
- Michael Hart (footballer) (born 1980), Scottish footballer
- Michael Hart (political scientist) (born 1956), British political scientist
- Michael Hart (judge) (1948–2007), British judge
- Michael J. Hart (1877–1951), American politician
- Michael S. Hart (1947–2011), American author, founder of Project Gutenberg
- Mick Hart (1970–2020), Australian musician
- Mickey Hart (born 1943), American percussionist
- Mickey van der Hart (born 1994), Dutch footballer
- Mike Hart (American football) (born 1986), American football player and coach
- Mike Hart (poker player), American poker player
- Mike Hart (outfielder, born 1951), American baseball player
- Mike Hart (outfielder, born 1958) (born 1958), American baseball player
- Mike Hart (singer-songwriter) (1943 – 2016), English singer, songwriter and poet
- Mikey Freedom Hart, American singer-songwriter
- Miranda Hart (born 1972), English actress, comedian and writer
- Moses Hart (1768–1852), Canadian businessman
- Moses Hart (1675–1756), English businessman, founder of Duke's Place Synagogue in London
- Moss Hart (1904–1961), American playwright, librettist and theater director
- Myra Hart, American businesswoman

== N ==
- Nancy Hart (1741–1830), American Revolutionary War spy
- Nathalie Hart (born 1992), Filipino actress
- Nathan Hart (born 1993), Australian cyclist
- Nathaniel G. S. Hart (1784–1813), American lawyer from Lexington, Kentucky
- Neal Hart (1870–1949), American actor
- Nelson Hart (born 1968), Canadian man convicted of murder
- Nettie Hart (died 1962), American industrial designer
- Nigel Hart (born 1958), English footballer

== O ==
- Oliver Hart (economist) (born 1948), American economist
- Oliver Hart (speedway rider) (1912–1983), English motorcycle speedway rider
- Oliver J. Hart (1892–1978), American bishop and priest
- Oona Hart, American model and actress
- Osborne Hart (born 1952), American socialist activist
- Ossian B. Hart (1821–1874), American judge and politician
- Owen Hart (1965–1999), Canadian-American wrestler

== P ==
- Pam Hart, Australian lawn bowler
- Parker T. Hart (1910-1997), American diplomat
- Patrick Hart (born 1965), British-Kuwaiti radio and TV personality
- Patti Hart, American business executive
- Paul Hart (born 1953), English football player and manager
- Paul Hart (photographer) (born 1961), British landscape photographer
- Paula Hart (born 1956), American television and movie producer
- Pearl Hart (1871–1928), Canadian-American outlaw
- Pearl M. Hart (1890–1975), American defense attorney
- Penny Hart (born 1996), American football player
- Percival Hart (16th-century MP) (1568–1642), English politician
- Percival Hart (1666–1738), English politician
- Pete Hart (American football) (born 1933), American football player
- Peter D. Hart (born c. 1942), American political consultant
- Peter E. Hart (born 1941), American computer scientist and entrepreneur
- Peter Hart (historian) (1963–2010), Canadian historian
- Peter Hart (military historian) (born 1955), British military historian
- Peter Hart (footballer) (born 1957), English footballer
- Phil Hart (politician), American politician from Idaho
- Philip D'Arcy Hart (1900–2006), British epidemiologist
- Philip Hart (1912–1976), American lawyer and politician
- Philip Hart (cricketer) (born 1947), English cricketer
- Philip Hart (organist) (1674 or 1676 – 1749, English organist and composer
- Phoebe Hart, Australian filmmaker and intersex rights activist
- Pop Hart (1868–1933), American artist
- Pro Hart (1928–2006), Australian artist

== R ==
- Randy Hart (born 1948), American football player and coach
- Raymond Hart (1913–1999), British seaman and a Royal Navy officer
- Raymund Hart (1899-1960), RAF Air Marshal
- Rebecca Hart (born 1984), American para-equestrian
- Reg Hart (1936–2019), New Zealand international rugby league footballer
- Reginald Hart (1848–1931), Recipient of the Victoria Cross
- Rich Hart (born 1952), American ice hockey player
- Richard Hart (curler) (born 1968), Canadian curler and Olympic medalist
- Richard Hart (Jamaican politician) (1917–2013), Jamaican historian, solicitor and politician
- Richard Hart (actor) (1915–1951), American actor
- Richard Hart (journalist), American journalist
- Richard Hart (jazz guitarist) (born 1955), American jazz musician
- Richard Hart (died 1578), English politician
- Richard Hart (cricketer) (born 1967), English cricketer
- Richard Hart (baker) (born 1977), British baker and author
- Richard Henry Hart (1862–1884), Australian school owner
- Richard James Hart (1892–1952), American sharpshooter and prohibition agent
- Richard Meredith Hart (1811–1864), Texas Ranger and cattleman
- Richard O. Hart (1927–2018), American lawyer and politician
- Richie Hart (born 1978), Scottish footballer
- Rick Hart (businessman) (born 1944), Australian businessman
- Rick Hart (sound engineer), American sound engineer
- Rita Hart (born 1956), American politician
- Rob Hart (born 1974), English gridiron football player
- Rob Hart (author) (born 1982), New York author
- Robbie E. Hart, American biologist
- Robbie Hart (cricketer) (born 1974), New Zealand cricketer
- Robbie Hart (born 1947), English football referee
- Robert Hart (musician) (born 1958), English singer
- Robert Hart (horticulturist) (1913–2000), British gardener
- Robert Hart (politician) (1814–1894), New Zealand politician
- Robin Hart (born 1978), Trinidadian footballer
- Rod Hart, American singer-songwriter
- Roddy Hart (born 1979), Scottish musician
- Roger Hart (born 1950), American writer and academic
- Romaine Hart (1933–2021), British film executive
- Ron Hart (born 1961), New Zealand cricketer
- Rose Hart (1942–2012), Ghanaian athletics competitor
- Ross Hart (born 1960), Canadian professional wrestler
- Ross Hart (politician) (born 1960), Australian politician and lawyer
- Roswell Hart (1824–1883), American politician
- Roxanne Hart (born 1952), American actress
- Roy Hart (performer) (1926–1975), South African actor and vocalist
- Roy Hart (gridiron football) (born 1965), American gridiron football player
- Roy Hart (English footballer) (1933–2014), English footballer
- Roy Hart (race walker) (born 1936), Welsh athlete
- Royce Hart (born 1948), Australian rules footballer
- Ruaraidh Hart (born 2004), Scottish rugby union player
- Rufus Erastus Hart (1812–1891), American politician
- Russell E. Hart (1872–1955), American architect
- Ruth Hart (1893–1952), American actress
- Ryan Hart (born 1979), British fighting game player

== S ==
- Sally-Ann Hart (born 1968), British politician
- Sam Hart (born 1996), English footballer
- Samuel Beecher Hart, Pennsylvania legislator
- Samuel Hart (priest) (1845–1917), American Episcopal priest
- Samuel Hart (merchant) (1747–1810), Canadian politician
- Sarah B. Hart, British mathematician
- Sarah Hart (musician), American songwriter and musician
- Sarah Hart (artist) (1880–1981), Canadian artist and educator
- Sergiu Hart (born 1949), Israeli mathematician and economist
- Shane Hart, British actor, screenwriter and casting director
- Sharon Hart, American higher education administrator
- Shaun Hart (born 1971), Australian rules footballer
- Shavez Hart (1992–2022), Bahamian sprinter
- Sigurd Hart (est. 816 – 856), Norwegian petty king
- Simon Hart (born 1963), British politician
- Smith Hart (1948–2017), American-Canadian professional wrestler
- Solomon Hart (1806–1881), English painter
- Sonny Hart (born 2006), English footballer
- Sophie Chantal Hart (1868–1948), American college professor
- Stan Hart (1928–2017), American comedy writer
- Stan Hart (speedway rider) (1914–1937), British motorcycle speedway rider
- Stanley Robert Hart (born 1935), American geologist
- Stephen Hart (footballer) (born 1960), Trinidad and Tobago footballer and manager
- Stephen Hart (bishop) (1866–1952), Australian bishop
- Stephen Hart (water polo) (born 1953), Canadian water polo player
- Stephen R. Hart (born 1958), Canadian actor
- Steve Hart (1859–1880), Australian bushranger
- Steve Hart (singer) (born 1972), Musical artist
- Stirling Hart (born 1989), Canadian professional lumberjack
- Stu Hart (1915–2003), Canadian professional and amateur wrestler, promoter, and trainer
- Stuart L. Hart, American academic
- Su Hart (born 1959), British musician
- Sunshine Hart (1886–1930), Comedy actress
- Susan Hart (born 1941), American actress
- Susanne Hart (1927–2010), South African veterinarian
- Sylvan Ambrose Hart (1906–1980), American mountain man

== T ==
- Tanja Hart (born 1974), German volleyball player
- Tanya Hart, American broadcaster
- Tao Geoghegan Hart (born 1995), British road cyclist
- Tara Lyn Hart (born 1978), Canadian singer
- Taylor Hart (born 1991), American football player
- Teddy Hart (born 1980), Canadian professional wrestler
- Terry Hart (born 1946), American astronaut
- Theodore Hart (1816–1887), Canadian businessman
- Thomas C. Hart (1877–1971), American Navy admiral and politician
- Thomas Hart (civil servant) (1909–2001), Scotland dual-international rugby union player & cricketer
- Thomas N. Hart (1829-1927), American manufacturer, businessman and politician
- Tiger Hart (1907–1996), British motorcycle speedway rider
- Tim Hart (1948–2009), English folk singer
- Tim Hart (Australian musician) (born 1984), Australian drummer and singer-songwriter
- Tom Hart (sportscaster), American sports commentator
- Tom Hart (Australian footballer) (1896–1971), Australian rules footballer
- Tom Hart (cartoonist) (born 1969), American comics creator
- Tom Hart (Australian politician) (1904–1972), Australian politician
- Tom Hart (baseball) (1869–1939), American baseball player
- Tommy Hart (1944–2024), American football player, coach and executive
- Tony Hart (1925–2009), English artist and TV presenter
- Tony Hart (theater) (1855–1891), American actor and singer
- Tony Hart (businessman) (1932–2020), Jamaican businessman, philanthropist, and politician
- Tony Hart (politician) (1923–2009), British businessman and politician
- Torrei Hart (born 1978), American TV personality
- Trevor Hart (1935–2022), Australian cricketer
- Truman Hart (1784–1838), American politician

== V ==
- Valerie Hart (1933–2021), Guyanese indigenous political leader
- Vaughan Hart (born 1960), British historian
- Verna Hart (1961–2019), African-American artist
- Veronica Hart (born 1956), American pornographic actress
- Vi Hart (born 1988), American recreational mathematician
- Victoria Hart (born 1988), English jazz-pop singer
- Virginia Hart (1914–2007), American politician
- Vivien Hart (1938–2009), American political scientist

== W ==
- W. D. Hart (1943-2026), American philosopher
- Walter Hart, 15th-century Bishop of Norwich
- Walter Hart (rugby union) (born 1935), Scottish rugby union player
- Walter R. Hart (1894–1969), Judge for Brooklyn and Staten Island
- Wayne Hart (1889–1970), American football player, coach, and administrator
- Wayne Hart (curler) (born 1949), Canadian curler
- Wes Hart (born 1977), American soccer player and coach
- Wilbert Hart (born 1947), American singer-songwriter
- Wilby Hart (1881–1967), British sculptor
- Will Cullen Hart (1971–2024), American musician
- William C. Hart (1898–1963), American soldier
- William E. Hart (1843–1874), American Medal of Honor recipient
- William Ewart Hart (1885–1943), Australian aviator and dentist
- William H. H. Hart (1848–1918), American politician
- William Hart (painter) (1823–1894), American painter
- William Hart (bishop) (1904–1992), Scottish Roman Catholic clergyman
- William Hart (Tasmanian politician) (1825–1904), Australian politician
- William Hart (priest) (1558–1583), English Roman Catholic priest and martyr
- William Hart (Medal of Honor) (1866–1899), United States Navy machinist and recipient of the Medal of Honor
- William Hart (police chief) (1924–2003), American police chief
- William Hart (actor) (died 1650), English actor
- William Hart (MP) (fl. 1388–1417), English MP
- William Henry Harrison Hart (1857–1934), American lawyer
- William Howard Hart (1863–1937), American painter
- William L. Hart (1867–1962), American judge
- William Matthew Hart (1830–1908), English painter
- William Neville Hart (1741–1804), British banker, politician and diplomat
- William S. Hart (1864–1946), American actor
- William Stanford Hart Sr. (1925–1999), American politician
- William Thomas Hart (1929–2023), American judge
- Willie Mae Young Hart (1915–2017), American nurse and civil rights activist

== Fictional characters ==
- Captain John Hart, character on Torchwood
- Kendall Hart, on the soap opera All My Children
- Kimberly Hart, in the Power Rangers universe

== See also ==
- Hart (disambiguation)
- Hart (given name)
- 't Hart, surname
- Harte
- Hardt (disambiguation)
- Harte (disambiguation)
- Heart (disambiguation)
