= Richard Hart =

Dick, Rich, Richie, Rick, or Richard Hart may refer to:

== Sports ==
- Dick Hart (American football) (born 1943), American football player
- Dick Hart (athlete) (1927–1991), American Olympic athlete
- Dick Hart (golfer) (1935–2013), American professional golfer
- Dick Hart (footballer) (1881–1934), Australian rules footballer
- Rich Hart (born 1952), American ice hockey player
- Richard Hart (curler) (born 1968), Canadian curler
- Richie Hart (born 1978), Scottish footballer
- Richard Hart (sailor), sailor from Great Britain, in 2012 Finn Gold Cup

== Politicians ==
- Richard Hart (died 1578), MP for Exeter
- Richard Hart (Jamaican politician) (1917–2013), Jamaican historian, solicitor and politician
- Richard Meredith Hart (1811–1864), American cattleman and politician
- Richard O. Hart (1927–2018), American lawyer and politician
- Richard Harte (died 1616), MP for Nottingham

== Others ==
- Dick Hart (painter) (born 1920), British painter
- Richard Hart (actor) (1915–1951), American movie, TV, and stage actor
- Richard Hart (jazz guitarist) (born 1955), jazz guitarist, composer, arranger
- Richard Hart (baker) (born 1977), British baker
- Richard Hart (journalist) (1980s), American journalist
- Richard "Two-Gun" Hart (1892–1952), a.k.a. James Vincenzo Capone, American law enforcement officer
- Rick Hart (businessman) (fl. late 20th century), Australian entrepreneur and president of Fremantle Football Club
- Rick Hart (sound engineer), American sound engineer
