= William Hart =

William Hart, also Will, Willy, Bill, or Billy Hart may refer to:

== Arts and entertainment ==
- William Hart (actor) (died 1650), English Caroline actor
- William Hart (painter) (1823–1894), Scottish-American painter
- William Hart (singer) (1945–2022), American soul singer, member of The Delfonics
- William Howard Hart (1863–1937), American painter
- William Matthew Hart (1830–1908), British lithographer and bird artist
- William S. Hart (1864–1946), American silent film actor, screenwriter, director, and producer
- William Sterling Hart (1917–2006), American actor, better known as Robert Sterling
- Will Cullen Hart (1971–2024), American musician and artist
- Billy Hart (born 1940), American jazz drummer

== Judiciary ==
- William Hart of Livelands, Scottist jurist and 16th century Lord Advocate
- William H. H. Hart (died 1918), American California attorney general
- William L. Hart (1867–1962), American justice of the Supreme Court of Ohio
- William Thomas Hart (1929-2023), United States federal judge

== Sports ==
- Bill Hart (footballer) (1923–1990), English professional footballer
- Bill Hart (infielder) (1913–1968), American professional baseball third-baseman with the Brooklyn Dodgers
- Bill Hart (pitcher) (1865–1936), American professional baseball pitcher
- Billy Hart (baseball) (1866–1944), American professional baseball player

== Other people ==
- William Hart (bishop) (1904–1992), Bishop of Dunkeld
- William Hart (Medal of Honor) (1866–1899), American sailor
- William Hart (MP), MP for Bletchingley
- William Hart (police chief) (1924–2003), Detroit Police Chief
- William Hart (Tasmanian politician) (1825–1904), Tasmanian businessman
- William Hart (priest) (1558–1583), Catholic martyr
- William Hart, drilled the first natural gas well in the US, leading to the Fredonia Gas Light Company's formation
- William C. Hart (1898–1963), United States Coast Guard member awarded the Gold Lifesaving Medal
- William E. Hart (1843–1874), Union Army soldier during the American Civil War
- William Ewart Hart (1885–1943), Australian aviator and dentist
- William Neville Hart (1741–1804), British banker, politician and diplomat
- William Stanford Hart Sr. (1925–1999), mayor of East Orange, New Jersey
- William Henry Harrison Hart (1857–1934), African American attorney and professor of criminal law
- William H. Hart (1864–1926), United States Army officer

== Other uses ==
- USCGC William Hart, a Sentinel-class cutter in the United States Coast Guard

== Fictional characters ==
- Bill Hart (comics), the civilian identity of the Lev Gleason Publications and Image Comics superhero Daredevil
