= Jane Hart =

Jane Hart may refer to:

- Jane Hart (writer), American writer and activist in Kentucky
- Jane Briggs Hart, aviator
- Jane K. Hart, professor of physical geography
- Jane Hart (artist), American curator, gallerist and artist

== See also ==
- Jane Sherron De Hart, American feminist historian and women's studies academic
