= Senator Hart =

Senator Hart may refer to:

== U.S. senators ==
- Gary Hart (born 1936), U.S. Senator from Colorado from 1975 to 1987
- Philip Hart (1912–1976), U.S. Senator from Michigan from 1959 to 1976
- Thomas C. Hart (1877–1971), U.S. Senator from Connecticut from 1945 to 1946

== Senators of American state legislatures ==
- Alphonso Hart (1830–1910), Ohio State Senate
- Alvin N. Hart (1804–1874), Michigan State Senate
- Craig Hart (fl. 2020s), West Virginia State Senate
- Elijah Carson Hart (1854–1929), California State Senate
- Ephraim Hart (New York politician) (1774–1839), New York State Senate
- Fred J. Hart (politician) (1906–1983), Illinois State Senate
- Gary K. Hart (born 1943), California State Senate
- George D. Hart (1846–1932), Massachusetts State Senate
- George Z. Hart (1924–2013), Michigan State Senate
- Jack Hart (politician) (born 1961), Massachusetts State Senate
- Jerome T. Hart (1932–1995), Michigan State Senate
- John M. Hart (1866–1955), Virginia State Senate
- Melissa Hart (politician) (born 1962), Pennsylvania State Senate
- Phil Hart (politician) (fl. 2000s–present), Idaho State Senate
- Rita Hart (born 1970), Iowa State Senate
- Rufus Erastus Hart (1812–1891), Ohio State Senate
- Truman Hart (1784–1838), New York State Senate

== See also ==
- Dennis J. Harte (1866–1917), New York State Senate
