= Jørgen Rasmussen =

Jørgen Rasmussen may refer to:

- Jørgen Rasmussen (footballer, born 1945), Danish footballer
- Jørgen Rasmussen (footballer, born 1937), Danish footballer
- Jørgen Buhl Rasmussen (born 1955), Danish chief executive of the brewing company Carlsberg Group
- Jørgen Frank Rasmussen (1930–2009), Danish cyclist
- Jørgen Skafte Rasmussen (1878–1964), Danish engineer and industrialist

== See also ==
- Jørgen Guldborg-Rasmussen, president of the Danish Scout Council
