= Margaret Hart =

Margaret Hart may refer to:

- Margaret Hart (NCIS)
- Margaret Hart Ferraro, née Margaret Hart and commonly known as Margie Hart, stripteaser

== See also ==
- Hart (surname)
