= James Morgan Hart =

American philologist and translator

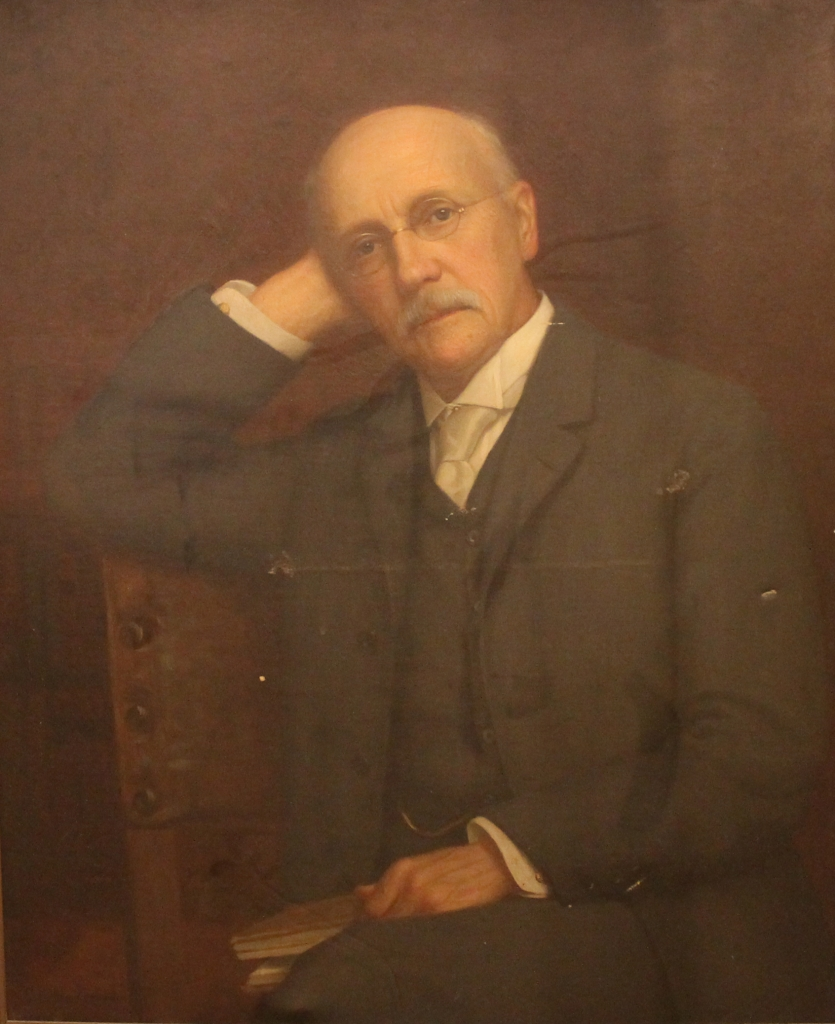
James Morgan Hart

James Morgan Hart (November 2, 1839 – April 18, 1916) was an American academic, philologist and translator.

== Biography ==
=== Childhood and early education ===
Hart was born in Princeton, New Jersey, on November 2, 1839, to John Seely Hart, a noted educator and literary figure, and Amelia Caroline. Shortly after his birth his father was appointed Principal of Central High School (Philadelphia, Pennsylvania), and the family moved to Philadelphia. Hart attended Philadelphia public schools and graduated from the Central High School in 1857. He received a B.A. degree from Princeton University in 1860.

=== Residence in Europe ===
After graduating from Princeton, Hart completed his education in Europe, traveling first to Geneva, and then matriculating at Göttingen University in 1861. After spending some semesters at the University of Berlin, he graduated from Göttingen with a Doctorate in Law. He returned to the United States in 1865 and spent two years practicing law in New York City. In 1867, he joined the faculty of the newly founded Cornell University as Assistant Professor of French and German. He left Cornell in 1872 to return to Germany to study philology, principally Anglo-Saxon, at the University of Leipzig. He returned to New York and wrote German Universities: A Narrative of Personal Experience, the first major description of the German university system to appear in the United States.

=== Academic career ===
Hart was Professor of Modern Languages and English Literature at the University of Cincinnati from 1876 until 1890, when he returned to Cornell to join the English faculty, where he taught until his retirement in 1907. He is credited with improving the standards of graduate education at Cornell and with helping to raise the prestige of the English department there. He was elected President of the Modern Language Association in 1895, and was a prolific contributor to Modern Language Notes and The Nation, in addition to a number of other magazines. Much of his writing attempted to describe the ideal of the research university to a popular audience in the United States. He died at the age of 76.

=== Selected works ===
Translations:

- Goethe, Faust (Part One), (New York: Putnam, 1878).
- Ibid., Hermann and Dorothea, (New York: Putnam, 1875).
- Ibid., Prosa, (New York: Putnam, 1876).
- Schiller, Piccolomini (New York: Putnam, 1875).

Original works:

- German Universities: A Narrative of Personal Experience (New York: Putnam, 1874).
- Syllabus of Anglos Saxon Literature (Cincinnati: Robert Clark & Co., 1881).
- Handbook of English Composition (Philadelphia: Eldredge, 1895).
- Essentials of Prose Composition (Ibid., 1902).
- The Development of Standard English Speech (New York: Holt, 1907).
