= Jørgen Buhl Rasmussen =

Danish businessman (born 1955)

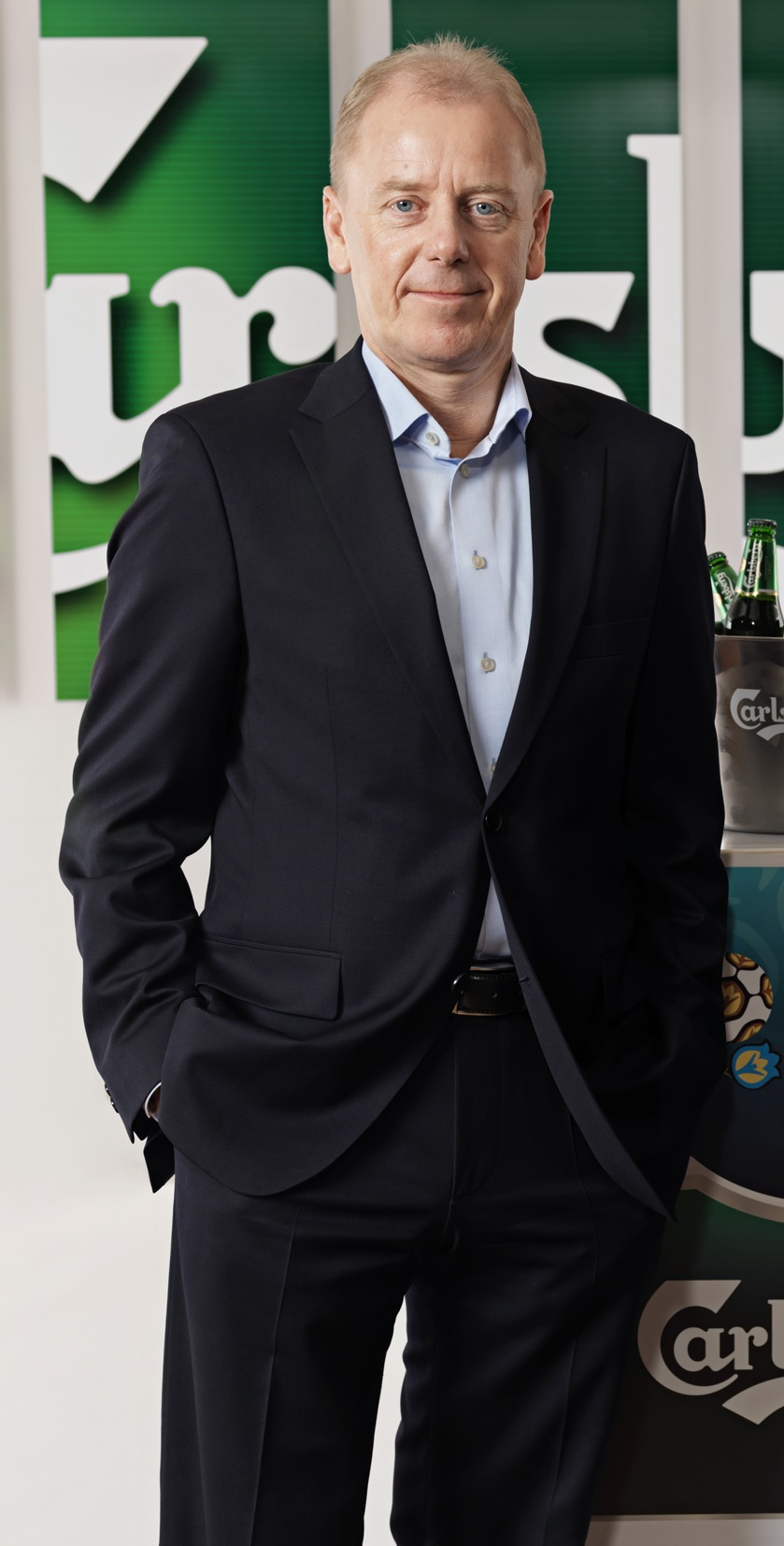
Rasmussen in 2012

Jørgen Buhl Rasmussen (born 18 August 1955) is a Danish businessman and former Chief Executive of the Danish multi-national brewing company Carlsberg Group (Carlsberg A/S), based in Copenhagen (native København) in Denmark. Carlsberg is the name of a district of Copenhagen. The main shareholder of Carlsberg is the Carlsberg Foundation.

== Early life ==
He has a BBA and an MBA from Copenhagen Business School.

== Career ==
He started his career at IFH Research International in Denmark, owned by the Anglo-Dutch Unilever, now owned by WPP since 1989.

=== Carlsberg ===
He joined the executive board of Carlsberg Group on 1 April 2006. He became Chief Executive on 1 October 2007. He retired from the position in June 2015 when he was succeeded by Cees 't Hart.
