= Esther Hastings Hart =

American entomologist and scientific illustrator (1862–1940)

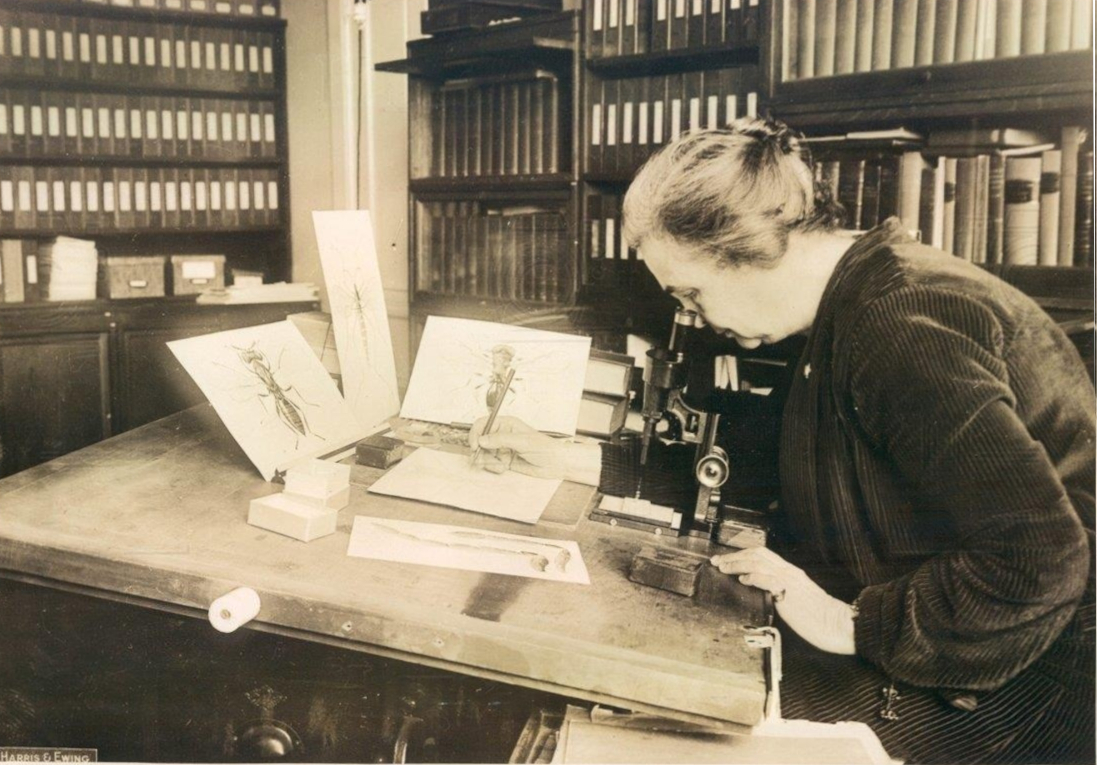
At work in 1924

Esther Hastings Hart (22 February 1862 – 3 August 1940) was an American entomological illustrator. She worked at the Bureau of Entomology for twelve years drawing insects for publications.

Hart was born in Elmira, New York, where her father Ira Hart was a well-known physician. She received an AB degree from Elmira college and spent four years to study the art of engraving at the Cooper Institute where she was a friend of Anna Botsford Comstock. She gave private lessons in art at her home in Elmira and in 1906 she worked in the Patent Office and the next year went to work with the Forest Service as a draftsman. Her expertise in illustrating insects led A. D. Hopkins to transfer her to the Bureau of Entomology in 1911. She worked on documenting forest insects and worked for 23 years, retiring in 1932. She was made a trustee of the Elmira College Alumnae Association in that year. She died after two years of illness in 1940.
