= Frania Hart =

Polish-born French painter

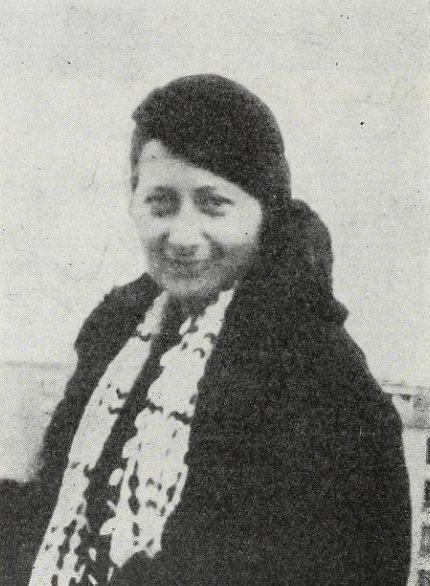
- Frania Hart portrait from Undzere farpaynikte kinstler
- Born: Frania Feigin; 1896; Warsaw, Kingdom of Poland
- Died: 1943 (aged 46–47)

Frania Hart (1896–1943) was a Polish-born French painter known mainly for portraits and still lifes. She was murdered in The Holocaust in 1943.

== Biography ==
She was born Frania Feigin in Warsaw in October 1896. She came from a family of fabric merchants. She studied in a Polish-language Gymnasium. Because she showed an interest in art from a young age, she was sent to study at the Academy of Fine Arts in Warsaw. In 1921 she went to Vienna to study in an art school there, and met Fritz Carp, a poet who was living there, and they were married. Together, in 1928 they left Austria for France. She enrolled in an art school there and entered into collaboration with a fellow artist named Benjamin Raphaël Secunda. While working as an artist in Paris, she did participate in some group exhibitions there and in Warsaw, where a local museum purchased some of her works. During World War II, she was no longer able to sell paintings and worked as a painting retoucher and seamstress to make ends meet. Due to her Jewish background, a fellow artist offered to hide her and her husband, but she declined. They were arrested by authorities in the middle of the night on 18 July 1943 along with several of their neighbors. They were deported to a concentration camp; her place and time of death are not documented.
