= Robbie E. Hart =

American biologist

Robbie E. Hart is a biologist at the Missouri Botanical Garden, where he directs the William L. Brown Center, a team of researchers dedicated to the study of useful plants, understanding the relationships between humans, plants, and their environment, as well as the conservation of plant species and the preservation of traditional knowledge. Hart is also the William L. Brown Curator of Economic Botany at the Missouri Botanical Garden. His research is focused on high-elevation plant ecology, climate change, and ethnobotany, and particularly the areas in which these three topics overlap. He has been a National Geographic Explorer since 2016. He currently serves as an honorary adjunct assistant professor in the department of biology at Washington University in St. Louis.
