= Jonathan Hart (poet) =

Canadian poet, literary scholar and historian

Jonathan Locke Hart is a Canadian poet, literary scholar and historian.

== Biography ==
Hart trained at the University of Toronto and the University of Cambridge. He has held visiting appointments at Harvard University, Princeton University, Toronto, Cambridge and elsewhere and has given readings and lectures in many countries. He is currently employed by Shanghai Jiao Tong University.

Hart's poetry has appeared in Harvard Review, Grain, Mattoid, and he has published books of poetry, such as Breath and Dust, Dream China and Dream Salvage. He has written extensively on Shakespeare (for instance, Theater and World), on literary theory (Northrop Frye), and on history, especially on empire and on the expansion of Europe (for example, Representing the New World, and Empires and Colonies). His poetry often explores the psychology of landscape and a sense of loss and exile. A central concern of his creative work and non-fiction is the relation between history and fictions (literary and legal).

The Times Higher Education Supplement revealed that since September 2011, Hart had simultaneously held two full-time academic positions until some time prior to 2013, one at the University of Alberta in Canada and another at Durham University in England. The University of Alberta became aware of the situation only in late 2012, and Hart is no longer employed by Durham.
