= Harte =

Notable people with the surname Harte include:

== Film and television ==
- Betty Harte (1882–1965), American actress in silent film era
- Joby Harte (born 1982), British TV personality
- Robert Harte (New Zealand actor), New Zealand actor

== Literature ==
- Bret Harte (1836–1902), American author and poet
- Emma Harte, a character in novels by Barabara Taylor Bradford
- Jack Harte (Irish writer), Irish short story writer and novelist
- Walter Harte (1709–1774), British poet and historian, friend of Alexander Pope

== Music ==
- Frank Harte (1933–2005), traditional Irish singer
- Leanne Harte, Irish singer-songwriter
- Mickey Joe Harte (born 1973), singer who represented Ireland at Eurovision

== Politics ==
- Dennis J. Harte (1866–1917), New York politician
- Jack Harte (politician) (born 1920), Irish Labour Party senator
- John Harte, Lord Mayor of London (1589-90)
- Paddy Harte (born 1931), Irish politician
- Robert Sheldon Harte (1915–1940), American communist, assistant to Trotsky

== Sport ==
- Bill Harte (born 1971), US soccer player
- Christopher Harte (born 1949), Irish cricketer
- David Harte (Gaelic footballer) (born 1981), Tyrone Gaelic footballer
- Ian Harte, Irish footballer
- Mickey Harte (born 1950s), Gaelic football manager
- Nigel Harte, Westmeath Gaelic footballer
- Pat Harte (active since 2006), Mayo Gaelic footballer
- Patsy Harte (born 1940), Irish hurler in Co. Cork

== Other ==
- Chris Harte, American newspaper publisher
- Edward H. Harte, (1922–2011), American newspaper executive, journalist, philanthropist, and conservationist, son of Houston
- Henry Hickman Harte (1790–1848), Irish mathematician
- Houston Harte (1893–1972), American newspaper publisher, father of Edward
- Verity Harte (born 1949), American philosopher
- Thomas Harte, Irish Republican

== See also ==
- Hart (disambiguation)
- Heart (disambiguation)
