= Hardt =

Hardt may refer to:

- Hardt (surname)
- Hardt, Westerwaldkreis, municipality in Rhineland-Palatinate, Germany
- Hardt, Baden-Württemberg, municipality in Baden-Württemberg, Germany
- Hardtwald, forest near Karlsruhe, Germany

== See also ==
- Haardt
