= Leon Hart (American football, born 1951) =

American football coach (born 1951)

Biographical details
- Born: April 27, 1951 (age 75)

Coaching career (HC unless noted)
- 1976–1980: Eastern Kentucky (assistant)
- 1981–1988: Eastern Kentucky (OC)
- 1989–1995: Elon

Head coaching record
- Overall: 37–37

Leon Hart (born April 27, 1951) is an American former college football coach. Hart served the head football coach at Elon University in Elon, North Carolina for seven seasons, from 1989 to 1995, compiling a record of 37–37. Before he was hired by Elon in January 1989, Hart worked as an assistant coach at Eastern Kentucky University for 13 seasons, the final eight as offensive coordinator. He was a member of two NCAA Division I-AA Football Championship-winning teams at Eastern Kentucky led by head coach Roy Kidd, in 1979 and 1982.

== Head coaching record ==
Year	Team	Overall	Conference	Standing	Bowl/playoffs
Elon Fightin' Christians (South Atlantic Conference) (1989–1995)
1989	Elon	1–9	1–6	8th	
1990	Elon	5–6	3–4	T–4th	
1991	Elon	6–5	3–4	T–4th	
1992	Elon	8–2	5–2	3rd	
1993	Elon	8–3	5–2	2nd	
1994	Elon	5–5	4–3	T–3rd	
1995	Elon	4–7	2–5	T–6th	
Elon:		37–37	23–26		
Total:		37–37			
