= Jenny Hart =

American artist (born 1972)

Jenny Hart (born 1972) is an American artist known for her work in embroidery.

Born in Iowa City, Iowa, Hart was raised in rural Illinois; she later moved to Los Angeles. She began using embroidery in 2000, and quickly found it an expressive medium for her own work. She has completed numerous commercial projects and written seven books about embroidery for Chronicle Books, and in 2001 started the company Sublime Stitching, which produces contemporary patterns for embroiderers to use. Hart was among the artists featured in the exhibit "40 Under 40: Craft Futures" at the Renwick Gallery of the Smithsonian Museum of American Art, and one of her pieces was subsequently accessioned by the museum.
