= Aubrey Hart =

Australian rules footballer

Personal information
- Full name: Aubrey Hubert Hart
- Born: 4 September 1893; Lewisham, New South Wales
- Died: 24 November 1958 (aged 65); Heidelberg, Victoria
- Height: 171 cm (5 ft 7 in)
- Weight: 70 kg (154 lb)

Playing career^{1}
Years	Club	Games (Goals)
1911–1912	St Kilda	4 (1)
- ^{1} Playing statistics correct to the end of 1912.

Aubrey Hubert Hart (4 September 1893 – 24 November 1958) was an Australian rules footballer who played for the St Kilda Football Club in the Victorian Football League (VFL).
