= Alfaretta Hart =

First Policewoman in Muncie, Indiana (1860–1951)

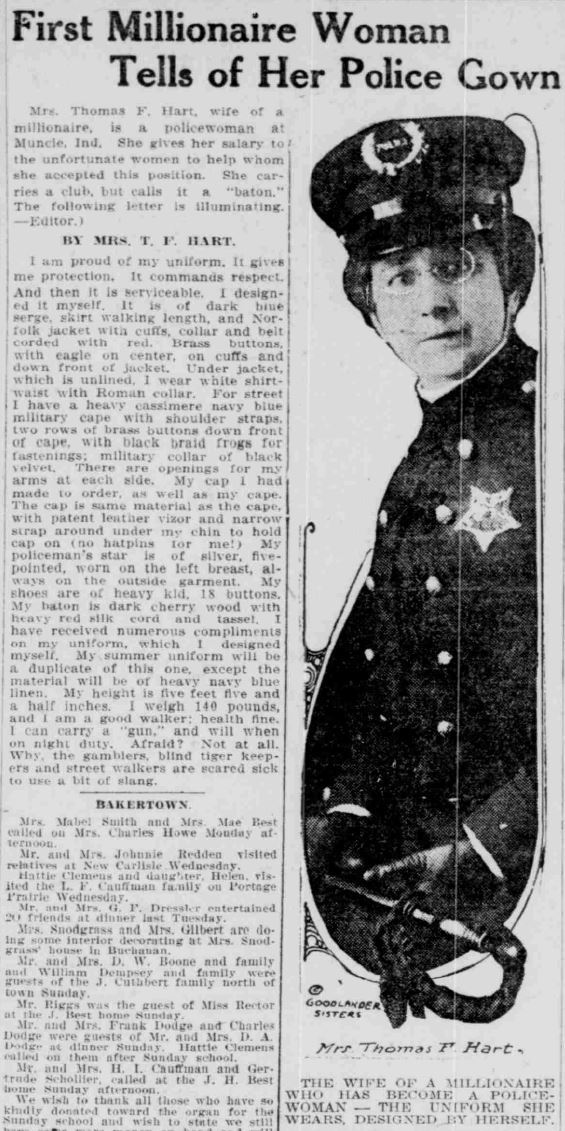
Newspaper Clipping showing Alfaretta Hart, Policewoman from Muncie, Indiana.

Alfaretta Hart (1860-January 16, 1951) was the first female police officer in Muncie, Indiana, an opponent of prohibition, and a newspaper journalist. Aside from her marriage to industrialist Thomas F. Hart, her early life has been largely undocumented.

In January 1914, fellow Muncie resident Daisy Douglas Barr advocated for the posting of a female policewoman as a method to curb sex work and other social issues in the city. When Muncie Mayor Rollin G. Bunch announced that the position had been created and Alfaretta Hart had been appointed, Barr was likely disappointed as Hart was not a Protestant crusader for prohibition (which the Ku Klux Klan-affiliated Barr would have preferred), but an anti-prohibition Catholic. She went to work calling out what she perceived as hypocritical actions of the "dry" contingent of the city while pledging to donate the whole of her income to the impoverished women and children of Muncie. After less than a year in the post, she left, citing "medical issues."

After her stint as a policewoman, she moved to Texas, where she became a journalist, writing for the Dallas Journal starting in 1934. She died at the Melrose Hotel in Dallas, Texas on January 16, 1951.
