= Vivien Hart =

American political scientist (1938–2009)

- Born: 1938
- Died: February 2, 2009 (aged 70–71)
- Education: Harvard University
- Scientific career
- Fields: Political science
- Workplaces: University of Sussex
- Doctoral advisor: Samuel H. Beer

Vivien Hart (1938 – February 2, 2009) was a political scientist, and scholar of constitutional law and American studies. She was the inaugural director of the Cunliffe Centre for the Study of Constitutionalism and National Identity at the University of Sussex, where she was professor of American studies. She was a scholar of constitutionalism, including how constitutions are created and interpreted and how they affect politics, often focusing on comparisons between Britain and the United States.

== Life and career ==
Hart was born in 1938. She studied political science at Harvard University, where Samuel H. Beer advised her doctoral dissertation. Hart became a professor of political science at the University of Sussex in 1974. She remained there for the rest of her career, but held visiting positions at a variety of institutions, including Smith College, the Brookings Institution, the Ohio State University, and Massey College, Toronto.

When the University of Sussex created the Cunliffe Centre for the Study of Constitutionalism and National Identity, Hart was chosen as the inaugural director. She became a professor of American studies at the University of Sussex in 1996.

Hart's research largely focused on British and American politics, constitutional law, and the relationship between constitutionalism and political dissent or conflict. She was the author of three books on these topics. In 1978, she published Distrust and democracy: Political distrust in Britain and America. In Distrust and democracy, Hart argues that the increasing distrust of public institutions and skepticism in government of Britain and the United States in the 1970s was not necessarily an anti-democratic or emotional phenomenon, but rather could be a constructive source of improvements for these countries' democratic systems. Hart also compared British and American politics in her 1994 book, Bound by our constitution: Women, workers and the minimum wage. In Bound by our constitution Hart compares the movements for minimum wage in Britain and the United States, using this case as a study of how the comparative constitutional frameworks of the two countries mediate policymaking on a major social reform issue. In 2003, Hart authored the United States Institute of Peace report Democratic constitution making.

Hart also edited several volumes. In 1993, Hart and Shannon C. Stimson co-edited the book Writing a national identity: Political, economic, and cultural perspectives on the written constitution. Hart also co-edited the 2003 book Women making constitutions: New politics and comparative perspectives with Alexandra Z. Dobrowolsky. Hart's research included extensive collaboration with Marcus Cunliffe.

Hart died on February 2, 2009.

== Selected works ==
- Distrust and democracy: Political distrust in Britain and America (1978)
- Writing a national identity: Political, economic, and cultural perspectives on the written constitution, co-edited with Shannon C. Stimson (1993)
- Bound by our constitution: Women, workers and the minimum wage (1994)
- "Constitution‐making and the Transformation of Conflict", Peace and change (2001)
- Democratic constitution making (2003)
- Women making constitutions: New politics and comparative perspectives, co-edited with Alexandra Z. Dobrowolsky (2003)
