= Nettie Hart =

American industrial designer (died 1962)

Nettie Hart (died September 21, 1962, age 44) was an industrial designer who worked on interior designs and color patterns for jet planes, automobiles, and building materials. She worked for Raymond Loewy beginning in 1946 and became vice president in 1961. She revised the Skylark pattern originally designed by Brooks Stevens for Formica laminates. She died in an automobile accident in Spain on September 21, 1962.
