= Paul Hart (photographer) =

British landscape photographer

Paul Hart (born 1961) is a British landscape photographer. His work “explores our relationship with the landscape, in both a humanistic and socio-historical sense”. His books include Truncated (2009), Farmed (2016), Drained (2018) and Reclaimed (2020), all published by Dewi Lewis. In 2018 he was awarded the inaugural Wolf Suschitzky Photography Prize (UK) by the Austrian Cultural Forum, London.

== Life and work ==
Hart studied art and design at Lincoln College of Art in 1984 and graduated from Trent Polytechnic with a BA Hons in Photography in 1988. He currently lives in Lincolnshire, England. He works solely with the black and white analogue process, using large format and medium format film cameras, processing and printing all work in his own darkroom. Between 2005 and 2008 Hart produced a series of photographs which explored the pine forest plantations of the Ladybower Reservoir in the Peak District National Park, resulting in the series and book Truncated. In 2009 he began photographing the landscape of East Anglia and made a series of photographs in The Fens. This initiated a ten-year project which resulted in a three-part series on the region: Farmed (2009–15), Drained (2016–17) and Reclaimed (2018–19).

== Publications ==
=== Publications by Hart ===
- Truncated. Stockport: Dewi Lewis, 2009. ISBN 978-1-904587-69-9. With an introduction by Gerry Badger.
- Farmed. Stockport: Dewi Lewis, 2016. ISBN 978-1-907893-97-1. With an introduction by Collier Brown. First edition, 2016; second edition, 2018.
- Drained. Stockport: Dewi Lewis, 2018. ISBN 978-1-911306-37-5. With an introduction by Francis Hodgson. First edition, 2018; second edition, 2020.
- Reclaimed. Stockport: Dewi Lewis, 2020. ISBN 978-1-911306-63-4. With an introduction by Isabelle Bonnet in French and with English translation.

=== Publications with contributions by Hart ===
- Chris Dickie. Photo Projects: Plan and Publish Your Photography – In Print and on the Internet. London: Argentum, 2006. ISBN 1-902538-44-7.
- Brooks Jensen. Looking at Images: A Deeper Look at Selected Photographs Published in LensWork and LensWork Extended. Anacortes, WA: LensWork, 2014. ISBN 978-0-9904681-0-3.
- Martin Barnes. Into the Woods: Trees in Photography. London: Victoria and Albert Museum/Thames & Hudson, 2019. ISBN 978-0-500-48053-3.
- Gerry Badger. Another Country: British Documentary Photography since 1945. London: Thames & Hudson; Bristol: Martin Parr Foundation, 2022. ISBN 978-0-500-02217-7.

== Exhibitions ==
=== Solo exhibitions ===
- Poetry of Place, Print Sales Gallery, The Photographers' Gallery, London, 2018
- Print Sales Gallery, The Photographers' Gallery, London, 2019
- Edgelands, Fen Ditton Gallery, Cambridge, UK, 2020

=== Group exhibitions ===
- Royal Academy of Arts, Summer Exhibition, London, 2012
- Royal Academy of Arts, Summer Exhibition, London, 2018
- Austrian Cultural Forum, London, Wolf Suschitzky Photography Prize, 2019
- Royal Academy of Arts, Summer Exhibition, London, 2019

== Awards ==
- 2018/19: Wolf Suschitzky Photo Prize, Austrian Cultural Forum, London and Vienna. UK Winner for Farmed and Drained.

== Collections ==
- Victoria and Albert Museum: 1 print (as of October 2020)
