= James Hart (artist) =

British illustrator

- Occupation: Illustrator
- Years active: 1940s and 1950s

James Hart (fl. 1940s and 1950s) was a British illustrator. He is known for his work for the Radio Times, including several cover illustrations, one of which was for the special 1947 "Radiolympia" number and another for the 1957 Christmas edition, depicting a red-breasted robin, holding a sprig of red-berried holly, in an otherwise monochrome setting. Tony Currie, who in 2001 wrote a history of the Radio Times, described the latter as "one of its most memorable Christmas designs". It was the magazine's first colour cover since World War II.

Hart also drew the cover of the Radio Times Annual 1956.
