= Horace Hart (footballer) =

English footballer

Personal information
- Full name: Horace Hart
- Date of birth: 16 August 1894
- Place of birth: Nottingham, England
- Date of death: 1975 (aged 80–81)
- Position: Wing half

Senior career*
Years	Team	Apps	(Gls)
1914–1915	New Hucknall Colliery		
1919	Stalybridge Celtic		
1919–1920	Nottingham Forest	6	(1)
Total		6	(1)
- * Club domestic league appearances and goals

Horace Hart (16 August 1894 – 1975) was an English footballer who played in the Football League for Nottingham Forest.
