= Willie Mae Young Hart =

American nurse and civil rights activist (1915–2017)

Willie Mae Young Hart (1915–2017) was an American nurse and civil rights activist in Portland, Oregon.

== Early life ==
Willie Mae Young Hart was born on April 4, 1915, in the town of Vicksburg, Mississippi. She was married to Theodore R. Hart.

== Personal life ==
Hart attended Saint Mary's Catholic high school and began training to become a nurse. She moved to Coos Bay Oregon in 1939 (formally known as Marshfield) and then to Portland. She left Mississippi in the late 1930s after her first child, a son was born. She said fear of violence against black men in the South prompted her decision to move.

== Work and activism ==
Willie Mae Young Hart helped start Portland's first Black-owned cab company with her friend Carlos Martin and husband Theodore Hart. She also helped found the Portland Chapter of the National Council of Negro Women and Women In Community Services (WICS).

In 2010 at the age of ninety-four she was still active in the community and working for social justice.

== Death ==
Willie Mae Young Hart died June 24, 2017, at aged 102.
