= Wilby Hart =

British sculptor (1881–1967)

Wilby Irvine Hart RVM
- Born: 31 August 1881; Bombay, India
- Died: 11 September 1967 (aged 86); Eastbourne
- Education: The London Hospital
- Occupations: Stone mason, sculptor and nurse to royalty

Wilby Irvine Hart RVM (31 August 1881 - 11 September 1967) was a stone mason and sculptor, and nurse to royalty including Prince Albert, later Duke of York and George VI. Hart was an early supporter of the College of Nursing (now Royal College of Nursing), and of nurse registration.

== Early life ==
Wilby Irvine Hart was born on 31 August 1881 in Bombay, India. She was one of at least four children born to her mother Keturah, and her father William, a barrister in the Indian Civil Service. In 1891 they were living in Bromsgrove, Worcestershire.

== Career ==
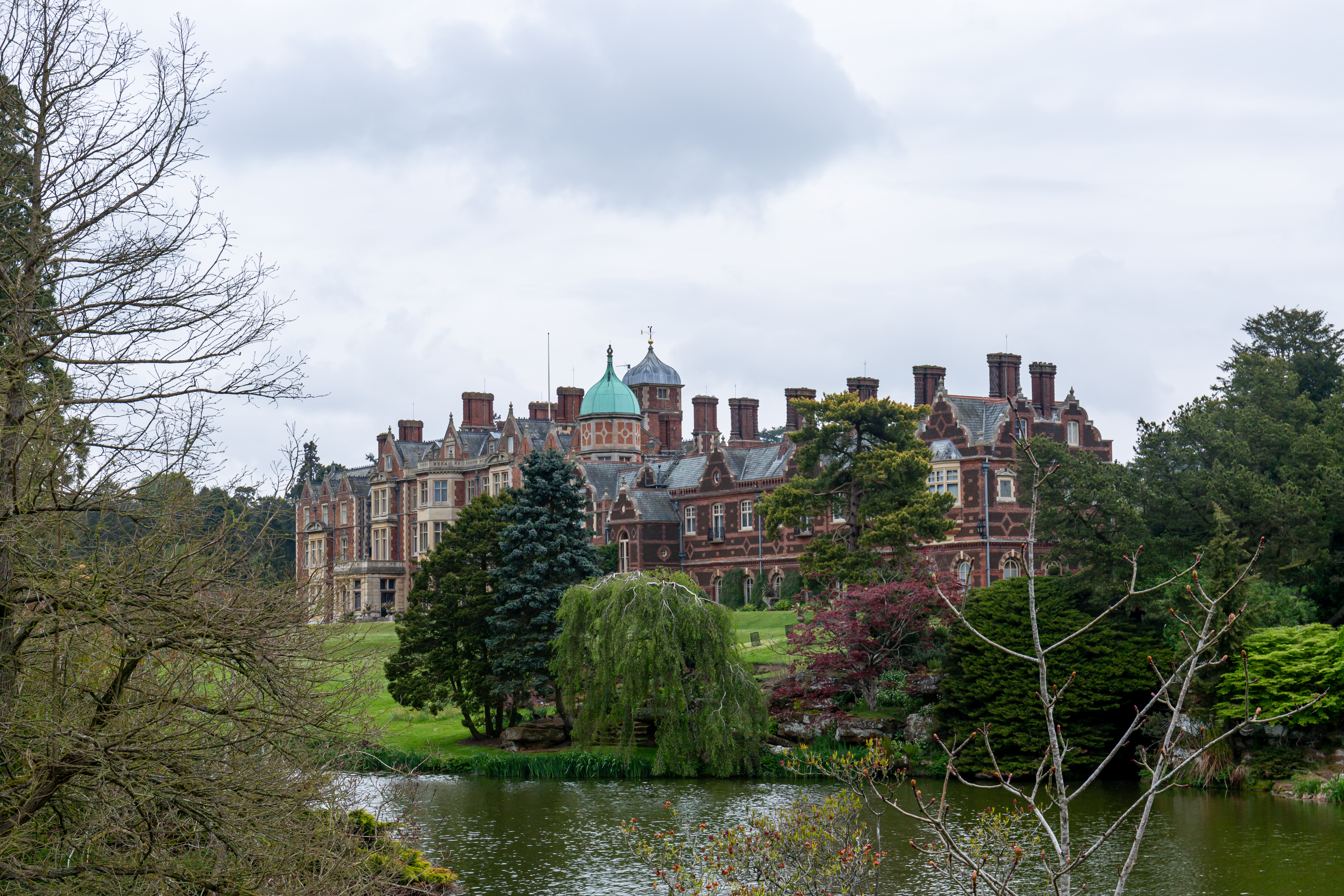
Sandringham House, where Hart nursed royalty

In 1904, Hart commenced training at The London Hospital under Matron Eva Luckes. She completed her training in 1908, and joined the hospital's Private Nursing Institute. She worked as a private nurse until at least 1923, and during this time cared for Prince Albert in 1917, for which George V awarded her the RVM.

In 1923, she was sent to Sandringham, where she nursed Princess Victoria, who had pneumonia. Whilst Hart was there, Empress Maria, the Dowager Empress of Russia and Queen Alexandra's sister, became ill, and Hart also cared for her alongside Lord Dawson, the king's physician and a London Hospital doctor. During the seven weeks she spent at Sandringham nursing royalty, Prince Albert, who was by then the Duke of York, got engaged to Lady Elizabeth Bowes Lyon (later Queen Elizabeth the Queen Mother) and brought her up to Hart's room to meet his former nurse.

== Honours ==
Hart was awarded the Royal Victorian Medal - Silver, in 1917 for her nursing services to Prince Albert.

== Retirement and death ==
Hart retired to Eastbourne by 1931/1932, and shortly afterwards she had a stroke. (Note: The earliest electoral roll that Hart is in for Eastbourne is 1931/32, but she may have moved here earlier.)

She retrained as a stone mason, and later also worked as a wood carver and sculptor. Hart exhibited extensively in Eastbourne.

She died on 11 September 1967 in Eastbourne, and left over £29,000 in her will. She left her 'mother and child' sculpture to the Towner Gallery, Eastbourne.
