= Hornell Hart =

American sociologist and parapsychologist

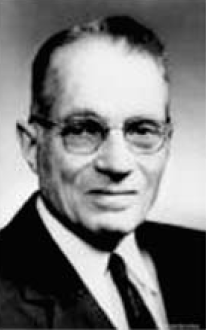
- Hart, c. 1960
- Born: Hornell Norris Hart; August 2, 1888; Saint Paul, Minnesota, U.S.
- Died: February 27, 1967 (aged 78)
- Occupation(s): Professor of Sociology, parapsychologist

Hornell Norris Hart (August 2, 1888 – February 27, 1967) was an American professor of sociology and parapsychologist.

He was born in Saint Paul, Minnesota and raised as a Quaker. In 1921, he obtained a Ph.D. from the Iowa State University.

Hart was professor of ethics at Hartford Theological Seminary from 1933 until 1938 when he accepted an appointment as professor of sociology at Duke University, he took interest in parapsychology. He co-wrote a paper with his wife on apparitions in the Proceedings of the Society for Psychical Research in 1933. The early death of his son and his religious convictions are said to have influenced his psychical writings and his belief in life after death.

In 1955 Hart delivered a paper on the "group characteristics of ghosts" at the International Conference on Psychic Research at Cambridge University. The six-day conference had been convened by Eileen Garrett, who a few years earlier had founded the Parapsychology Foundation in New York. Hart's paper was based on a review of 165 cases of alleged sightings from around the world.

== Publications ==
- The Science of Social Relations (1927)
- The Technique of Social Progress (1931)
- Living Religion: A Manual for Putting Religion Into Action in Personal Life and in Social Reconstruction (1937)
- New Gateways To Creative Living (1941)
- Personality and the Family (1941)
- Autoconditioning: The New Way to a Successful Life (1956)
- Your Share of God: Spiritual Power for Life Fulfillment (1958)
- The Enigma of Survival: The Case For and Against an After-Life (1959)
- Toward a New Philosophical Basis for Parapsychological Phenomena (1965)
