= James Hart (physician) =

Scottish physician (died 1639)

James Hart (fl. 1633; d. 1639) was an English physician and medical writer. He studied at Paris and in Germany; graduated abroad; and practised at Northampton. He published Anatomie of Urines (1625), and Kλινική, or the Diet of the Diseased (1633).

== Life ==
James Hart was born probably between 1580 and 1590, and, though his pedigree cannot be traced, most likely in Northamptonshire. In 1607 and 1608, or perhaps longer, he studied in Paris, and travelled in other parts of France. He afterwards lived at Meissen in Saxony; in 1610 was travelling in Bohemia, and went probably later to Basle to complete his studies. Either at Basle or elsewhere on the continent he took the degree of MD and about 1612 settled as a physician probably from the first at Northampton, where he lived at least twenty or thirty years, and apparently succeeded in practice. He never belonged to the College of Physicians (though that body licensed his chief work in flattering terms) nor to the Company of Barber-Surgeons. He was a strong Puritan, an appellation which he adopts more than once in his writings.

== Works ==
Hart's principal work, Kλινική, or the Diet of the Diseased (London, 1633, folio), though little known, is of interest and value. This "fruit of twenty years' experience" is an attempt, quite in harmony with the Hippocratic traditions, to prescribe the proper regimen and physical conditions in disease as well as in health, dealing with health, air, exercise, and the like, though not with drugs. It had scarcely any forerunner in medical literature since the Classical times, and though the importance of such matters is now generally recognised, it has had till the nineteenth century but few successors. Its general character is that of a learned compilation modified by common sense and experience. In copiousness of quotation it sometimes almost approaches Burton's Anatomy of Melancholy; and the zeal displayed in refuting vulgar errors is worthy of Sir Thomas Browne himself. In rationality and freedom from the tyranny of therapeutic routine it is far in advance of most medical works of the time, and apart from its professional interest presents instructive pictures of the manners and customs of the seventeenth century.

Hart's two other works (both dedicated to Charles I when Prince of Wales) are entitled:

1. The Arraignment of Urines, by Peter Forrest, epitomised and translated by James Hart, London, 1623, 4to;
2. The Anatomie of Urines, or the second part of our Discourse on Urines, London, 1625, 4to.

They expose the fallacies of diagnosis by means of an examination of urine at the hands of ignorant persons, and attack three kinds of trespassers on the medical domain, unlicensed quacks, meddlesome old women, and above all, prescribing divines. The British Library copy of the first of these works has bound up with it a manuscript chapter, evidently in the handwriting of the author, which it is said "could by no means be got to be licensed"; it also strongly denounces the "intrusion of parsons … upon the profession of phisicke".

== Bibliography ==
- Payne, Joseph Frank (1891). "Hart, James (fl.1633)" . In Stephen, Leslie; Lee, Sidney (eds.). Dictionary of National Biography. Vol. 25. London: Smith, Elder & Co. p. 60.
- Symons, John (2004). "Hart, James (d. 1639), physician". In Oxford Dictionary of National Biography. Oxford University Press.
