= Johnny Hart (Australian footballer) =

Australian rules footballer

Personal information
- Full name: John Alexander Hart
- Born: 1 October 1888; Eganstown, Victoria
- Died: 20 February 1966 (aged 77); Seddon, Victoria

Playing career^{1}
Years	Club	Games (Goals)
1911	Essendon	4 (0)
- ^{1} Playing statistics correct to the end of 1911.

John Alexander Hart (1 October 1888 – 20 February 1966) was an Australian rules footballer who played with Essendon in the Victorian Football League (VFL).
