= Martin Hart =

English cricketer (born 1927)

Personal information
- Full name: Martin de Lisle Hart
- Born: 17 November 1927; Ealing, Middlesex, England
- Batting: Right-handed
- Bowling: Leg break

Domestic team information
- Years: Team
- 1951: Oxford University

Career statistics
| Competition | First-class |
|---|---|
| Matches | 4 |
| Runs scored | 8 |
| Batting average | 1.60 |
| 100s/50s | –/– |
| Top score | 4 |
| Balls bowled | 474 |
| Wickets | 6 |
| Bowling average | 55.00 |
| 5 wickets in innings | – |
| 10 wickets in match | – |
| Best bowling | 2/77 |
| Catches/stumpings | 4/– |
- Source: Cricinfo, 5 May 2020

Martin de Lisle Hart (born 17 November 1927) is an English former first-class cricketer.

Hart was born at Ealing. He later studied at St Edmund Hall at the University of Oxford. While studying at Oxford, he played first-class cricket for Oxford University in 1951, making four appearances against Gloucestershire, Middlesex, the Free Foresters and Leicestershire. Playing as a leg break bowler, he took 6 wickets at an average of 55.00 and with best figures of 2 for 77.
