= John Hart (RAF officer) =

RAF pilot (1916–2019)

John Stewart Hart
- Born: John Stewart Hart; 11 September 1916; Sackville, New Brunswick, Canada
- Died: 18 June 2019 (aged 102)
- Military career
- Allegiance: United Kingdom
- Branch: Royal Air Force
- Service years: 1938-1946
- Rank: Squadron leader
- Units: No. 602 Squadron; No. 67 Squadron
- Conflicts: Second World War: Battle of Britain; Burma Campaign; Italian Campaign
- Awards: Distinguished Flying Cross

Squadron Leader John Stewart Hart DFC (11 September 1916 – 18 June 2019) was a Canadian Royal Air Force (RAF) pilot from 1938 to 1946. He flew Lysanders in the RAF Army Cooperation Command, Spitfires in the Battle of Britain, Hurricanes in Burma and Mustangs in Italy.

== Awards ==
Distinguished Flying Cross (London Gazette on 15 June 1945)
