= John P. Hart =

American attorney (born 1960)

John P. Hart (born 1960) is an American attorney. He was involved in the campaign and administration of President Bill Clinton and later became the founder and chair of the Impact Center, a nonpartisan nonprofit working to educate citizens, train activists, and develop leaders.

== Education ==
An attorney by training, Hart practiced law in Washington, D.C., and served as law clerk to James T. Turner of the United States Court of Federal Claims. He graduated from the Catholic University of America in 1982 with a B.A. and received an Alumni Award in 1997. He received his J.D. from the Fordham University School of Law.

== Clinton Administration ==
In late 1992, Hart was part of a group which began planning for the Bill Clinton transition to the White House prior to the election to be held in November of that year. He had previously been the chief delegate counter.

During the Clinton Administration, Hart served for four years as Deputy Assistant to the President and Deputy Director of Intergovernmental Affairs. In that capacity, he served as President Clinton's representative to state and local elected officials on federal-state policy, and was on an informal panel that the Clintons consulted on Catholic affairs. Under Attorney General Janet Reno, Hart was appointed as Principal Deputy Director at the United States Department of Justice, Office of Community Oriented Policing Services (COPS). At COPS, he was responsible for the management and administration of a $1.4 billion annual budget and a 250-member staff which was responsible for coordinating among federal, state, and local governments to institute community policing initiatives.

== Later career ==
Hart had an interest in education policy and served as Director of Policy Implementation for the James B. Hunt Institute for Educational Leadership and Policy at the University of North Carolina at Chapel Hill. Prior to that, he served as Vice President for Strategic Initiatives and Government Affairs for Ovations, a division of UnitedHealth Group, whose purpose was to improve public, private, and nonprofit sector partnerships in health care.

Hart was founder and chair of the Impact Center, which states on its website that the "Impact Center's mission is to empower emerging and accomplished leaders with the knowledge, skills and network they need to expand their impact on their organizations and our society."

In December 2005, Hart began the American Democracy Institute, which is part of the Impact Center, with several others who had also worked in the Clinton White House. In February 2006, they organized a regional youth summit in Philadelphia where Hillary Clinton (then a U.S. Senator) spoke.

He is the Chief Operating Officer of Safe Kids, a global nonprofit organization which seeks to prevent childhood injury.

He is a senior consultant with Mobius Executive Leadership.
