= William Hart (actor) =

English actor (died 1650)

William Hart (died 1650) was an English actor during the reign of Charles I and purportedly the father of the Restoration actor Charles Hart.

== Career ==
St Giles parish registers identify Hart as a "Weaver als[o] player", apparently having either turned to acting after being a weaver or alternately working in both occupations. A judgement for debt shows that he received money from the King's Men in January 1630, presumably for acting. He is named in the licence granted to King's Revels Men on 28 November 1634. By 12 January 1636 he was back with the King's Men at the Blackfriars Theatre, and he is named on two other lists of King's Men employees, the last dated 12 January 1637.

He was named in a 1661 lawsuit as being an actor in London in 1648.

He had three documented children, all baptised in St Giles: Anne, baptised 16 March 1636; Winefred, baptised 29 July 1638 and buried 19 July 1639; and Mary, buried 23 Nov. 1639. He was buried at St Giles on 9 November 1650.

== Speculations ==
During the 19th century William Hart was assumed to be the son of Joan Hart, Shakespeare's sister, but there is no evidence to support the identification, and Shakespeare's nephew died a bachelor and was buried at Stratford-upon-Avon 29 March 1639.

Hart is also taken to be the father of the acclaimed Restoration actor Charles Hart, largely on the evidence that the two were members of the King's Men.
