= Richard Hart (jazz guitarist) =

American jazz musician

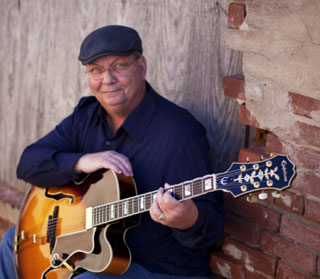
- Born: 12 November 1955 (age 70); Los Angeles, California

Richard W. Hart is a jazz fusion guitarist who has opened for numerous jazz acts and has taught music in Utah, Oklahoma, and California. He has composed his own songs and has recorded the albums Fearless Shores on Innervision Records and Blue Swing on Slowernickels Records.

In 2008 Hart signed with GAG Order Films, which used music from his album Fearless Shores as the background music for their film The Lawn Boy. Seven of the nine tracks from the album are featured in the movie. Then film was screened at the Hollywood Black Film Festival in June 2008 and at the San Francisco Black Film Festival later the same month.

== Early life ==
Richard Hart grew up in the outskirts of Los Angeles, CA before relocating to Oklahoma in 1980. Once settled, he began collaborating with local musicians and writing original music. In 1981, he met Larry Pierce, a jazz keyboardist who had previously been a member of Blood, Sweat and Tears. Together, they performed as 'Richard Hart & Swans Down featuring Larry Pierce' at the Susan Powell Fine Arts Auditorium in Elk City, Oklahoma.

== Career ==
In 2004, Hart started working on a new project, writing original material for an upcoming album release. He formed a quartet with jazz saxophonist Ron Munn, bassist Dorothy Soto, and percussionist Mark Winkel, and they recorded Fearless Shores in 2005, which was later released on the Schepora IRL label. The quartet went on to perform at the Charlie Christian International Jazz Festival in Oklahoma City in June 2005. Since 2009, Hart has continued to work with new musicians from Oklahoma, performing throughout the region including the Texas Panhandle.
