= John Seely Hart =

American writer

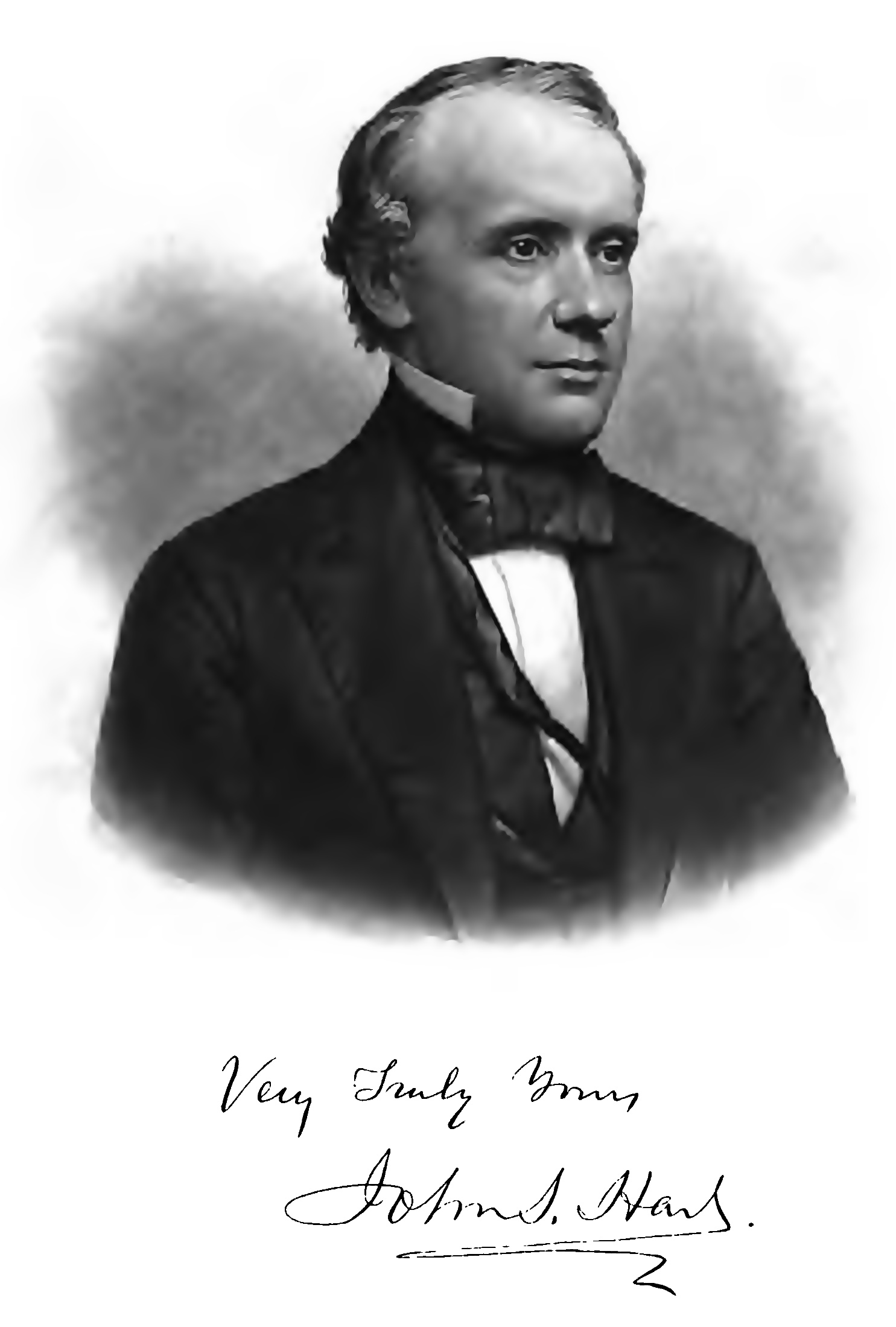
Engraving of John Seely Hart with his signature.

John Hart (January 28, 1810 – March 26, 1877) was an American writer and educator.

== Biography ==
=== Childhood ===
Hart was born in Old Stockbridge, Berkshire County, Massachusetts, on January 28, 1810. When he was two years old, his father, with a number of other heads of families, moved to Pennsylvania and settled in Providence township, on the Lackawanna River. In in 1823 the family moved again to Laurel Run, in the Wyoming Valley, about two miles from Wilkes-Barre, Pennsylvania.

=== Education ===
His health in early youth was delicate, and his physical strength small. He completed preparatory studies at Wilkes-Barre Academy, and entered the College of New Jersey at Princeton, (now Princeton University), in 1827, and was graduated in 1830, with the highest honors of his class. During the year following his graduation, he taught, as Principal of an Academy at Natchez, Mississippi, and in 1831 returned to Princeton and entered the Theological Seminary.

=== Presbyterian ministry ===
He spent three years there, and was regularly graduated in 1834. During the last two years of his course, he filled the position of Tutor in the college. In 1834 he was elected Adjunct Professor of Ancient Languages in Princeton College, and filled that chair two years.

Professor Hart was licensed to preach the gospel by the Presbytery of New Brunswick, August 4, 1835, but having determined, after some years, to devote his life to literary and educational pursuits, his license was, at his own request, withdrawn by the Presbytery, October 19, 1842.

=== Educational responsibilities ===
In 1836, he purchased Edgehill School in Princeton, from Professor E. C. Wines, and resigned his Professorship in the College. He retained the charge of Edgehill School until 1842, when he was selected Principal of Central High School (Philadelphia, Pennsylvania), as well as Professor of Moral, Mental and Political Science. He found this institution in a state of feebleness and placed it on a solid foundation of discipline, accomplishments and popular confidence —making it a representative American institution. In 1844, he was elected as a member of the American Philosophical Society.

In 1848 he received the degree of LL.D. from the University of Miami. He continued to be Principal of Central High School until 29 October 1858, when he resigned in order to become Editor of the periodicals published by the American Sunday School Union, and in this connection he began the Sunday-school Times.

In 1862 he was elected Principal of the New Jersey State Normal School (now The College of New Jersey at Trenton), and held that position with distinguished usefulness and success until February 1871. From 1864 to 1870 he also gave courses of lectures on English Literature in Princeton College. In 1872 he was elected Professor of Belles Lettres and English Literature in Princeton College, which chair he filled two years, returning near the end of 1874 to Philadelphia, where he resided until his death, engaged in literary pursuits. During the months preceding his last illness, he had been delivering a course of popular and instructive lectures on the works of Shakespeare.

=== Death ===
About two months before his death, he suffered a severe fall upon an icy pavement on Chestnut Street, breaking his hip-bone and inflicting internal injuries. After much severe suffering, he died in Philadelphia, March 26, 1877, at the age of 68. Prof. Hart was a man of quiet and retiring manners, yet social and sunny in his temperament, an enthusiast in the cause of education, a devoted Sabbath-school worker, of elegant culture, accurate and wide scholarship, author of many volumes, and possessing great force and earnestness of mind.

In 1902 famous artist and former Central High School student Thomas Eakins painted his posthumous portrait from a photograph.

== Books ==
He wrote an immense number of books related to grammar and biography, including:

- A Brief Exposition of the Constitution of the United States for the Use of Common Schools
- An Elementary Grammar of the English Language: With an Analysis of the Sentence
- Class Book of Poetry: Consisting of Selections from Distinguished English and American Poets, From Chaucer to the Present Day
- Class Book of Prose: Consisting of Selections from Distinguished English and American Authors, From Chaucer to the Present Day
- Elements of Universal History, on a New and Systematic Plan
- Epitome of Greek and Roman Mythology (note: this text is in Latin)
- The Female Prose Writers of America: With Portraits, Biographical Notices, and Specimens of their Writings
- First Lessons in Composition
- Language Lessons for Beginners
- A Manual of American Literature: A Text-book for Schools and Colleges
- A Manual of Composition and Rhetoric: A Text-book for Schools and Colleges
- In the School-room: Chapters in the Philosophy of Education
- Mistakes of Educated Men
- Punctuation and the Use of Capital Letters
- A Short Course in Literature, English and American
- The Sunday-school Idea: An Exposition of the Principles which Underlie the Sunday-School Cause
