= Dick Hart (footballer) =

Australian rules footballer

Personal information
- Full name: Richard Hart
- Born: 25 December 1881; Fitzroy, Victoria
- Died: 8 June 1934 (aged 52); Carlton, Victoria
- Original team: Carlton Imperials

Playing career^{1}
Years	Club	Games (Goals)
1901–02	Carlton	11 (4)
- ^{1} Playing statistics correct to the end of 1902.

Richard Hart (25 December 1881 – 8 June 1934) was an Australian rules footballer who played with Carlton in the Victorian Football League (VFL).

== Family ==
The son of Alfred Hart (1857–1920), and Jane Frances Hart (1855- –1914), née McCracken, Richard Hart was born at Fitzroy, Victoria on 25 December 1881.

He married Bridget Mary "Cis" Mahoney (1881–1939) in 1902.

== Football ==
He played in 11 senior games and kicked 4 goals, over two seasons (1901–1902) for the Carlton Football Club in the VFL.

== Death ==
He died at his residence in Carlton, Victoria on 8 June 1934.

=== Obituary ===
"Mr. R. Hart, poultry Inspector and demonstrator for the Department of Agriculture died on Friday, and is to be buried to-day. He entered the service of the department in July, 1899, under his father, the late Alfred Hart, chief poultry expert.
At the time the Panama Exhibition was held [viz., 1915] he and Mr. [Herbert Frederick] Clinton, another officer of the department, prepared the exhibit of dressed poultry for which the Department of Agriculture was awarded the gold medal against all exhibitors.
Mr. Hurt has prepared exhibits and given demonstrations at practically every agricultural and poultry show in Victoria. His annual exhibit at the Royal show always attracted a great deal of attention.
He Judged poultry at the Victorian Poultry and Kennel Club for several years, and has been a judge at the Royal Agricultural Society for over 25 years.
As a young man he took active interest in sport. About 1901-2 he played cricket and football for Carlton. He was for a time a ground bowler at the Melbourne cricket ground." — The Age, 11 June 1934.
