= William E. Hart =

American Medal of Honor recipient (1843–1874)

- Born: 1843; Rushville, New York
- Died: October 21, 1874; Champlain Canal, Mechanicville, New York
- Military career
- Allegiance: United States
- Branch: United States Army; Union Army
- Service years: 1861 - 1865
- Rank: Corporal
- Units: (New York (state)) Company B,8th New York Volunteer Cavalry Regiment
- Conflicts: American Civil War • Valley Campaigns of 1864 & 1865
- Awards: Medal of Honor

William E. Hart (1843 – October 21, 1874) was a Union Army soldier during the American Civil War. He received the Medal of Honor for gallantry during the Valley Campaigns of 1864 & 1865. Hart was instrumental in the capture of Confederate cavalry raider Colonel Harry Gilmor on February 4, 1865.

Hart enlisted in the Army from Rushville, New York in October 1861, and mustered out with his regiment in June 1865.

== Medal of Honor citation ==
"The President of the United States of America, in the name of Congress, takes pleasure in presenting the Medal of Honor to Private William E. Hart, United States Army, for extraordinary heroism on 1864 & 1865, while serving with Company B, 8th New York Cavalry, in action at Shenandoah Valley, Virginia, for gallant conduct and services as scout in connection with capture of the guerrilla Harry Gilmore."

== See also ==
- List of Medal of Honor recipients
- List of American Civil War Medal of Honor recipients: G-L
- 8th New York Volunteer Cavalry Regiment
