= Rich Hart =

American ice hockey player

- Born: October 5, 1952 (age 73) Boston, Massachusetts, U.S.
- Height: 6 ft 0 in (183 cm)
- Weight: 195 lb (88 kg; 13 st 13 lb)
- Position: Defense
- Shot: Left
- Played for: WHA; Birmingham Bulls; AHL; Providence Reds; Rochester Americans; IHL; Dayton Gems; Columbus Owls
- NHL draft: Undrafted
- Playing career: 1975–1978

Richard Edward Hart also known as Dick Hart (born October 5, 1952) is an American former professional ice hockey defenseman.

During the 1976–77 season, Hart played four games in the World Hockey Association with the Birmingham Bulls.

== Career statistics ==
| | | | Regular season | | | | | Playoffs |
| Season | Team | League | GP | G | A | Pts | PIM | GP | G | A | Pts | PIM |
|---|---|---|---|---|---|---|---|---|---|---|---|---|
| 1972–73 | Boston College | NCAA | 30 | 0 | 9 | 9 | 38 | — | — | — | — | — |
| 1973–74 | Boston College | NCAA | 28 | 4 | 23 | 27 | 56 | — | — | — | — | — |
| 1974–75 | Boston College | NCAA | 28 | 8 | 20 | 28 | 36 | — | — | — | — | — |
| 1974–75 | Providence Reds | AHL | 7 | 0 | 3 | 3 | 6 | 1 | 0 | 0 | 0 | 0 |
| 1975–76 | Broome Dusters | NAHL-Sr. | 25 | 2 | 3 | 5 | 83 | — | — | — | — | — |
| 1975–76 | Dayton Gems | IHL | 3 | 0 | 1 | 1 | 29 | — | — | — | — | — |
| 1975–76 | Columbus Owls | IHL | 24 | 0 | 7 | 7 | 51 | — | — | — | — | — |
| 1975–76 | Rochester Americans | AHL | 6 | 0 | 0 | 0 | 19 | — | — | — | — | — |
| 1976–77 | Rochester Americans | AHL | 3 | 0 | 0 | 0 | 48 | 12 | 0 | 0 | 0 | 4 |
| 1976–77 | Birmingham Bulls | WHA | 4 | 0 | 0 | 0 | 0 | — | — | — | — | — |
| 1976–77 | Charlotte Checkers | SHL-Sr. | 1 | 0 | 1 | 1 | 5 | — | — | — | — | — |
| 1976–77 | Winston-Salem Polar Twins | SHL-Sr. | 3 | 0 | 1 | 1 | 4 | — | — | — | — | — |
| 1976–77 | Beauce Jaros | NAHL-Sr. | 13 | 0 | 3 | 3 | 48 | — | — | — | — | — |
| 1977–78 | San Diego Mariners | PHL | 38 | 4 | 5 | 9 | 70 | — | — | — | — | — |
| WHA totals | | | 4 | 0 | 0 | 0 | 0 | — | — | — | — | — |
| AHL totals | | | 16 | 0 | 3 | 3 | 73 | 13 | 0 | 0 | 0 | 4 |
| IHL totals | | | 27 | 0 | 8 | 8 | 80 | — | — | — | — | — |
| NAHL-Sr. totals | | | 38 | 2 | 6 | 8 | 131 | — | — | — | — | — |
