= Dick Hart (painter) =

British painter

- Born: 3 April 1920; Isle of Sheppey, England
- Died: 5 January 1990 (aged 69); Banbury, England
- Occupation: Painter

Richard J. J. Hart (3 April 1920 – 5 January 1990) was a British painter, who trained at the Royal Academy Schools. His work was part of the painting event in the art competition at the 1948 Summer Olympics. He also illustrated and designed dust jackets for a number of books, in particular works of children's literature
