= Rick Hart (businessman) =

Australian businessman (born 1944)

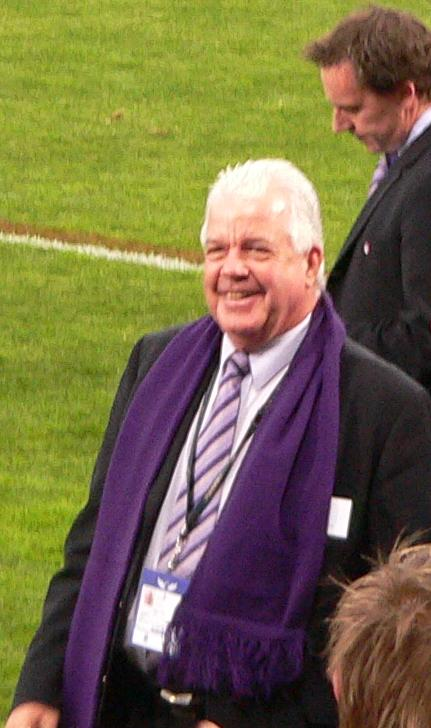
- Rick Hart after a Fremantle Football Club win
- Born: 1944 (age 81–82); Merredin, Western Australia
- Education: Merredin High School
- Known for: Entrepreneur, horse racing, Fremantle Football Club
- Spouse: Lesa Hinchliffe
- Children: Belinda Hart, Michael Hart, Jeremy Hart

Rick Hart is a Western Australian businessman and former president of the Fremantle Football Club. Hart commenced retail trading in 1975, and has since been involved in a number of retail start-ups including Rick Hart Group, Kitchen HQ and Hart & Co. He also was chairman of Renaissance Minerals (2010-2013) during its initial public offering.

== Early life ==
Hart was born in Merredin, Western Australia in 1944, and grew up on a rural property where his mother and father owned a general store. His early life was spent in the country, tractor harvesting and playing a wide range of sports. Upon graduation from Merredin high school, Hart's initial ambition was to be a journalist, and he applied for a cadetship at The West Australian. Being unsuccessful, he sought an internship at Dalgety. Successfully gaining employment, Hart moved to Perth, marking his first experience within the retail sector, specialising in wholesale wine and spirits for the next fourteen years. After Dalgety, Hart entered the horse racing industry as a bookmaker (1989-1992) with his first standing role being at the Albenear Races under the employment of his friend's father.

== Personal life ==
Hart continues his start-up ventures through his family-owned business Hart & Co, ran in conjunction with his two children Belinda and Michael, and close friend Nicholas Kirby. In addition to managing Hart & Co, Hart remains an avid golfer, as well as supporter of his former club, the Fremantle Football Club. Hart enjoys many weekends on his Serpentine property, as although he has largely retired from the racing industry, he continues to breed horses.

== Community service ==
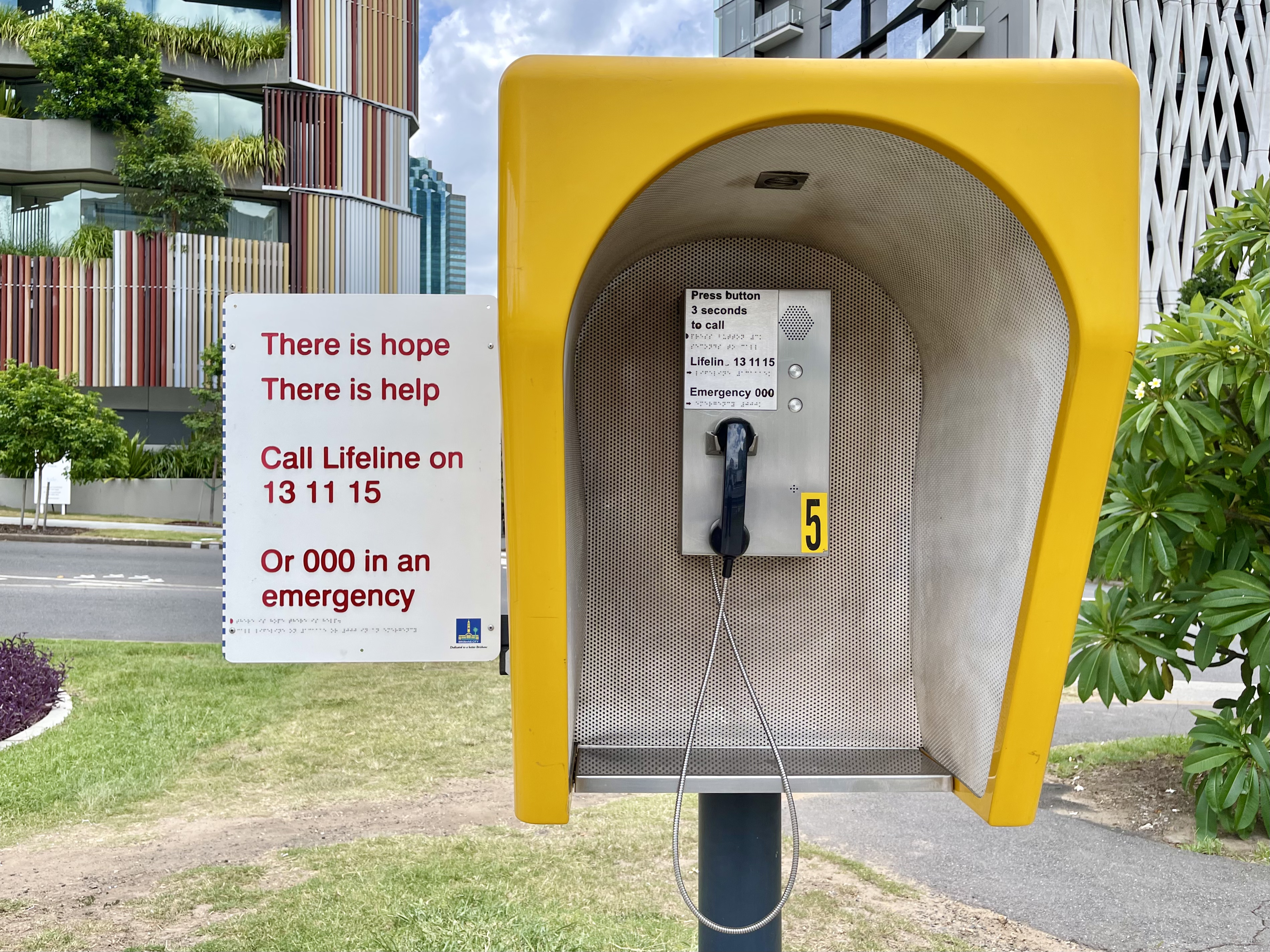
Free telephone linked to suicide prevention hotline, Lifeline

Hart is a major advocate for the Make-A-Wish Foundation, working closely with the foundation for over ten years and raising over $300,000. Hart's commitment to young children extended beyond Make-A-Wish, through his commitment to grassroots football. During his time at Hart Group, the company sponsored several senior and junior sporting associations in addition to the Australian Umpires Association. Since 2013 Hart has focused on the importance and impact of mental health, specifically Lifeline and the prevention of suicide. In an attempt to raise funds for Lifelines' telephone counsellors Hart hosts an annual "Hart & Co Golf Day". This day involves teams of four competing against each other to raise funds for Lifeline, with tickets costing $550 per person.

== Career ==
Hart employed an investment strategy similar to that of search funds for a number of his businesses. This strategy revolved around the identification of market opportunities, scaling of businesses in terms of revenue, market capitalisation, and store locations, then ultimately exiting the firm via an eventual acquisition or takeover.

=== Rick Hart Group ===
While Hart's retail career was influenced by his parents owning a general store, it was his friend's career that led to his initial venture into retail. His friend, an insurance broker, had tipped him off that a container of damaged refrigerators was up for auction. Hart submitted a tender and secured the refrigerators, seeking to sell them for an additional weekend income. This identification of a market opportunity proved to be successful, and from 1979 to 2004 Hart scaled up to a multi-million dollar kitchen appliances retail chain. Eventually, Hart Group was "too big to be private, and it had to be acquired or publicly listed". Hart sold to Clive Peeters, receiving $10.5 million in July 2005. Despite Peeter's ownership of the Rick Hart group the retail chain continued to trade under the Hart brand. Peeters was soon floated on the Australian Securities Exchange (ASX), and Hart remained executive director until his initial retirement in 2009. Following Hart's departure from Peeters, the company, and as a result Hart Group, was purchased by Harvey Norman on 2 July 2010. This eventually led to the closure of all Hart Group stores. As 11 August 2011, Harvey Norman executive chairman Gerry Harvey announced that the Clive Peters brand was "tainted beyond repair". This saw Clive Peters and Hart Group stores either converted into Harvey Norman stores, or closed down and sold off where there were existing Harvey Norman stores nearby.

=== Renaissance Minerals ===
Following his initial retirement in 2009, Hart continued his career as Chairman of Renaissance Minerals, marking his first venture into the commodities industry. The Perth-based mineral exploration company was a subsidiary of Griffin Minerals, an established mining company with the purpose of acquiring, exploring and developing gold and other mineral deposits. In 2010, under Hart's management, the company participated in an initial public offering. As noted within the chairman's prospectus letter, the purpose of this $5m raising of capital funds at 20c per share was to improve RNS's financial leverage, allowing them to borrow more, and as a result accelerate their mining projects. This business venture proved to be relatively short and inefficient, with Hart leaving the company in June 2014. At this time the company's market capitalisation had dropped significantly, with shares now valued at less than 10 cents. Eventually in November 2016 RNS was delisted from the ASX by a compulsory acquisition conducted by Emerald Resources at 7 cents per share.

=== Kitchen HQ ===
In 2010, whilst chairman of Renaissance Minerals, Hart also re-entered the Australian retail industry with his new business Kitchen HQ. This business sought to specialise in the wholesale of high-end kitchen appliances. In less than four years, Hart sold Kitchen HQ for an undisclosed sum to Winning Appliances, to build on the latter's online offering in Western Australia. Hart remained affiliated with Kitchen HQ, being a brand ambassador for Winning Group up until 2019, due to his large influence within the Western Australian retail sector.

=== Hart & Co. ===
As of May 2021, Hart is the executive chairman of the family-owned business Hart & Co. The company's central operation is its appliance showroom. Hart & Co. seeks to differ from competitor showrooms through a value-added approach to customers, including before-purchase and after-purchase cooking demonstrations. The business has one location, in Osborne Park, Western Australia. It is managed and operated by Rick Hart, long time business partner Nicholas Kirby and his two children, Belinda and Michael. Hart's role sees him guiding business strategy, marketing, and key stakeholder relationships, while also assuming the role of brand ambassador due to his influence within the retail industry.

=== Checkout Factory Outlet ===
In May 2021, Hart began a new business venture, Checkout Factory Outlet. The company is part of Hart Group and builds on the successes of Rick Hart Seconds, a former subsidiary chain that specialized in bulk buys and factory seconds. The company currently consists of one store, located alongside the Hart & Co on Guthrie Street in Osborne Park.

== Sports endeavours ==
=== Fremantle Football Club ===
From 2002 to 2009 Hart was president of the Fremantle Football Club, a professional Australian Football League team. At this time, the club was financially unviable, in addition to only winning 2 of the 21 games in the 2001 AFL season. Hart sought to rebuild the club, emphasising the importance of members and their substantial impact in terms of revenue and financial performance. As a result, membership numbers grew from 23,775 in 2002 to 39,202 in 2009, which was nine years of consecutive growth. In terms of performance, under Hart's presidency the Dockers entered their first semi-final in 2003, as they finished 5th overall in the competition.

=== Race horses ===
Hart participated in both the racing and breeding of horses. His most successful venture in the industry was “Jacks or Better”, a thoroughbred who won the Karrakatta Plate Railway Stakes Double in 1995, making it the first horse to achieve this feat since La Trice in 1968. Over his career Jacks or Better had a total of 19 wins, two of those being group one wins, garnering him an 11% win percentage and 44% placement percentage. Ultimately, this saw Hart's original investment of $20,000 produce a total of $913,305 in earnings. As of May 2021 Jacks or Better is retired on Hart's Serpentine property.

In mid-January 2016 Hart joined the Racing & Wagering Western Australia Owners Only program as an ambassador. Hart's role is to promote the project and its associated benefits, as well as attending a variety of Owners Only events. This organisation is designed to encourage Western Australians to buy into racing horses or dogs; as Hart describes it, "something which has given him a lifetime of enjoyment".

Hart's involvement in the racing industry dates back to his time at Rick Hart Group, being a registered bookie from 1979 to 1992. Throughout this period he became one of Australia's highest-profile bookmakers and a president of the Western Australia Bookmakers' Association. In 1989, then chairman of the Bookmakers' Association, Hart resigned from the industry due to the way in which the Turf Club and other aspects of the industry were treating bookmakers in this state. Hart ultimately stayed close to the industry, becoming a member of the Western Australian Turf Club Committee and named apparent heir to the chairmanship of the committee, before being appointed chairman of the Fremantle Dockers in 2003.
