= Cees 't Hart =

Dutch businessman

- Born: 1958 (age 67–68)
- Education: Leiden University
- Occupation: CEO of Carlsberg Group

Cornelis Christiaan "Cees" 't Hart (born 1958) is a Dutch businessman and the chief executive officer (CEO) of the Carlsberg Group from 2015 to 2023.

== Education ==
He earned his MA in Social Science from Leiden University and later attended Harvard University’s General Management Program.

== Business career ==
He has been the CEO of Carlsberg A/S since June 2015, and works from the company's main office in Copenhagen, Denmark.

Prior to Carlsberg, he had a series of executive positions at Unilever, including running divisions in Italy and Poland. In 2008, 't Hart accepted the position of CEO of Friesland Foods, Netherlands, leading the merger with Campina foods into Royal FrieslandCampania. He is also on the board of Air France-KLM. In 2015 't Hart received the award of officer of the Order of Orange Nassau.

In 2023, 't Hart managed Carlsberg's full divestiture of its operations in Russia, which had previously accounted for 13% of the company's revenue. Following an eight year tenure 't Hart is expected to retire as CEO in the fall of 2023.
