= Jane Hart (writer) =

American writer (1922–2006)

Jane Hart (July 16, 1922 – May 21, 2006) was involved in numerous political issues and contributed years of service in the mentally/physically challenged arenas in the state of Kentucky.

She married Ken Hart, a radio station manager and newspaperman, and had two sons and a daughter in Frankfort, Kentucky.

Hart authored many articles on the subject as well as two books titled, Let's Think About Time and Where's Hannah.

In 1968 Jane Hart co-founded and also served as chairwoman emeritus of the Kentucky Disabilities Coalition.
