= Richard O. Hart =

American lawyer and politician (1927–2018)

Richard Odum Hart (December 13, 1927 – March 12, 2018) was an American lawyer and politician.

Hart was born in Benton, Illinois and graduated from Benton Consolidated High School in 1945. He served in the United States Navy in 1945 and 1946. Hart received his bachelor's degree in political science and economics from University of Illinois Urbana-Champaign in 1951 and his law degree from the Washington University School of Law at Washington University in St. Louis in 1954. Hart was admitted to the Illinois bar in 1954 and practiced law in Benton, Illinois. He was also involved in the banking business. Hart served in the Illinois House of Representatives from 1969 to 1978 and was a Democrat. Hart died at Barnes-Jewish Hospital in St. Louis, Missouri.
