= Jane K. Hart =

British geographer and academic

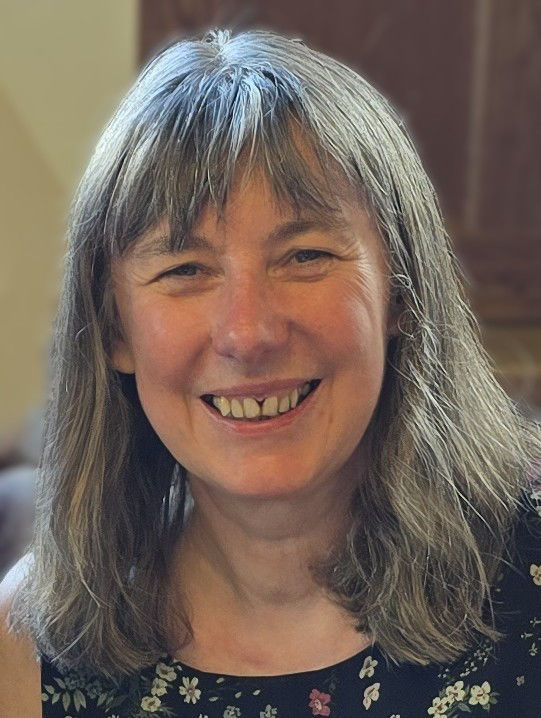
- Born: Colchester, England
- Education: University of Reading; University of East Anglia
- Scientific career
- Workplaces: University of Southampton
- Thesis: Genesis of the North Norfolk Drift (1987)

Jane K. Hart is professor of physical geography in the School of Geography and Environmental Science at the University of Southampton in the United Kingdom. She has a BSc in Physical Geography from the University of Reading and a PhD in Glaciology from the University of East Anglia. She was lecturer in Physical Geography at the University of Manchester (1988–89). Currently she is EGU General Secretary, President of the Quaternary Research Association (QRA) and Chair of the "Funds for Women Graduates".

== Research ==
Jane Hart's research is in glacial sedimentology and Environmental Sensor Networks and informatics. In glacial sedimentology and glaciology, the research is concerned with the formation of till (glacial sediments), glaciotectonics and links between subglacial processes and climate change. Her research has been carried out at numerous modern day glaciers including Iceland, Greenland, Svalbard, Norway and Alaska; as well as Quaternary (Ice Age) sediments from Norfolk, Wales, Ireland, Germany, USA and New Zealand. She is particularly concerned with the quantification of subglacial processes, highlighted from her research on in situ subglacial experiments, ground penetrating radar (GPR), time –lapse cameras and UAV surveying.

She has pioneered the development of Environmental Sensor Networks (wireless sensor networks) for studying/monitoring the environment, particularly in relation to glaciers and climate change. She co-leads the Glacsweb project which was the first project to develop a wireless sensor network to study glacier processes. A key part of this project was the design and deployment of in situ probes within the ice and the till which measured glacier processes and relayed the data 'live' via the internet (Briksdalsbreen, Norway, 2003–2006); Skalafellsjokull, Iceland 2008–2015). This was followed by the Mountain Sensing project to use Internet of Things ((IoT)) technology to monitor climate change on the Cairngorm Plateau, Scotland (2013–15).

== Professional roles and advocacy ==
Jane Hart was elected European Geosciences Union general secretary (2022–24 and 2024–26). She is a member of the Earth and Space Science Informatics (ESSI) section at the European Geosciences Union and American Geophysical Union. She is the co-founder of the series of conferences on Environmental Sensor Networks since 2004; she was on the AGU ESSI Programme Committee (2017–2020), and on the AGU ESSI Executive committee, as Chair of the Programme Committee (2018–19), was the EGU representative (2020–21) and Chair of the Lepkoukh Award Committee (2020–21) and currently on the Edward A. Flinn award committee. She was the deputy president of EGU ESSI (2020–21).

She is the president of the Quaternary Research Association. Prior to that she was vice-president of the QRA (2019–22) and chair of the inaugural Quaternary Research Association EDI committee.

In 2022 she was appointed onto the NERC Advisory Network, and has been on the "NERC Constructing a Digital Environment Expert Network" as a senior panel member (2019–2022, 2022–2024). She is a member of the UKRI Interdisciplinary Assessment College, She was deputy head of school (Education) (2021–2024), Head of School (2012–13), Head of Research Group in the School of Geography and Environmental Science, University of Southampton. She is also on the national Geography Accreditation Review Panel, which is run by the Royal Geographical Society – Institute of British Geographers (2019–22).

She is an advocate for women's rights and education. She has been involved with "Funds for Women Graduates", a UK Charity which supports women postgraduates, and is the chair of governors. She was one of the founding members of the University of Southampton Women in Science Engineering & Technology (WiSET) group, jointly began the annual Campbell Lecture (celebration of Women in Science) and has been the chair of WiSET twice.

== Publications ==
- Hart, J.K., Baurley, N.R., Bonnie, A., Robson, B.A., Bragg, G.M. and Martinez, K. (2025). "Seasonal velocity patterns provide insights for the soft-bed subglacial hydrology continuum", Comms. Earth & Environment, 6, 223.
- Hart, J.K., Martinez, K., Baurley, B., Robson, B.A. and Andrews, A. (2025). "Different styles of subglacial soft bed hydrology – examples from Breiðamerkurjökull and Fjallsjökull Iceland". Earth Surface Processes and Landforms, 50 e70014
- Hart, J.K., Young, D.S., Baurley, N. R., Robson, B. and Martinez K (2022). "The seasonal evolution of subglacial drainage pathways beneath a soft bedded glacier". Nature Communications Earth & Environment, 3, 1–3.
- Hart JK, Martinez K, Young DS, Basford P, Robson B & Clayton A 2019a: "Surface melt driven summer diurnal and winter multi-day stick-slip motion and till sedimentology". Nature Communications, 10, 1599.
- Hart JK, Martinez K, Basford PJ, Clayton AI, Bragg G M, Ward T & Young DS 2019b: "Surface melt-driven seasonal behaviour (englacial and subglacial) from a soft-bedded temperate glacier recorded by in situ wireless probes." Earth Surface Processes and Landforms.
- Hart JK, Clayton AI, Martinez K & Robson BA 2018: "Erosional and depositional subglacial streamlining processes at Skálafellsjökull, Iceland: an analogue for a new bedform continuum model." GFF, DOI: 10.1080/11035897.2018.1477830.
- Martinez K, Hart JK, Basford PJ, Bragg GM, Ward T & Young DS 2017: "A geophone wireless sensor network for investigating glacier stick-slip motion." Computers & Geosciences, 105, 103–112.
- Hart, J.K., 2017. Subglacial till formation: Microscale processes within the subglacial shear zone.
- Young D, Hart JK & Martinez K 2015: Image analysis techniques to estimate river discharge using time-lapse cameras in remote locations. Computers & Geosciences 76, 1–10. (doi:10.1016/j.cageo.2014.11.008).
- Hart JK & Martinez K 2015: Towards an Environmental Internet of Things (IoT). Earth and Space Science 2, 194–200.doi:10.1002/2014EA000044.
- Hart JK, Rose KC, Waller RI, Vaughan-Hirsch D & Martinez K. 2011: Assessing the catastrophic break up of Briksdalsbreen, Norway, associated with rapid climate change. J. Geol. Society of London 168 1–16.
- Hart JK, Rose KC & Martinez K 2011: Subglacial till behaviour derived from in situ wireless multi-sensor subglacial probes: Rheology, hydro-mechanical interactions and till formation. Quat. Sci.Rev.30 234–247.
- Hart JK, Rose KC & Martinez K 2011:Temporal englacial and subglacial water variability associated with a rapidly retreating glacier. Earth Surface Processes & Landforms 36 1230–1239.
- Hart JK, Rose KC, Martinez K & Ong R 2009: Subglacial clast behaviour and its implication for till fabric development: new results derived from wireless subglacial probe experiments. QSR 28 597–607.
- Rose KC, Hart JK & Martinez K 2009: Seasonal changes in basal conditions at Briksdalsbreen, Norway: the winter–spring transition. Boreas 38 579–590.
- Hart JK & Martinez K 2006: Environmental Sensor Networks: A revolution in the Earth System Science? Earth-Science Reviews 78,177–191.
- Hart JK, Martinez K, Ong R, Riddoch A, Rose K & Padhy P 2006: An autonomous multi-sensor subglacial probe: Design and preliminary results from Briksdalsbreen, Norway. Journal of Glaciology 52 389 – 397.
- Martinez K, Hart JK & Ong R 2004: Environmental Sensor Networks. Computer 37 (8), 50–56.
- Hart JK 1997: The relationship between drumlins and other forms of subglacial def. QSR 16 93–108.
- Hart JK 1995: An investigation of the deforming layer/debris-rich ice continuum, illustrated from three Alaskan glaciers. Journal of Glaciology 41 619–633.
- Hart JK 1994: Till fabric associated with deformable beds. Earth Surf. Proc. & Land. 19 15–32.
- Hart JK & Roberts DH 1994: Criteria to distinguish between subglacial glaciotectonic and glaciomarine sedimentation: I – Deformational styles and sedimentology. Sed. Geology 91 191–214.
- Hart JK & Boulton GS 1991: The interrelationship between glaciotectonic deformation and glaciodeposition. Quaternary Science Reviews 10 335–350.
- Hart JK, Hindmarsh RCA & Boulton GS 1990: Different styles of subglacial glaciotectonic deformation in the context of the Anglian ice sheet. Earth Surface Processes and Landforms 15 227–242.
