= Richard Meredith Hart =

Texas Ranger and cattleman

Richard Meredith Hart (1811–1864) was an early Texas settler, soldier and cowman who served as a Texas Ranger and in the Texas militia.

== Early life ==
Richard was born in Hardin County, Kentucky in 1811 to Josiah Hart. His brother John Hart would serve as a commander in the Texas Militia with Richard serving under him. He relocated to Texas in c1833, making a stop in Arkansas where he married Mary Riley in 1831. In total the couple had 6 children. The family lived in Red River County, Texas in an area that is today part of Fannin County.

== Military career ==
On July 20, 1836, Hart was mustered into the Texas Militia, serving in a cavalry company that was commanded by his brother John. He only served for a number of months, being discharged on October 20, 1836. From March 16, 1839, to September 16, 1839, he served in the Texas Rangers. He received a headright certificate granting him one league and one labor of land. He also received a total of 320 acres for serving in the Texas Army and in 1840 he reported owning 1,280 acres and twenty cattle in Fannin County, as well as 1,090 acres in Red River County. He would become a cattleman later in life, with operations in Hunt, Navarro, Erath, Comanche and Johnson counties. He would sell stock at Fort Belknap as well as other army posts.

In 1846, Hunt County was organized and Hart become one of the commissioners. In 1855 he bought land on Mustang Creek in Johnson County, roughly a mile from what is now the town of Rio Vista. He built a two-story house which is known as the Meredith Hart House. The house was designated on the National Register of Historic Places on April 13, 1977.

Later in life his first wife died and he remarried Cassandra Wilkins. The couple had three children.

== Death ==
During the American Civil War Hart lost most of his land and holdings. He died in December 1864 and is buried near his home in Johnson County.
