= Jane Hart (artist) =

American curator, gallerist and artist

Jane Hart (born 1958) is an American curator, gallerist, and artist in New York City. She has worked as an art curator since 1993, having been a gallery owner at in Los Angeles and Miami, and a contemporary art professional in Manhattan and London. As an artist (working under the alias TJ Ahearn), she has exhibited internationally, with solo exhibitions in South Florida and Cleveland, Ohio. Her specialty is contemporary collage, with works in private collections in the United States and abroad.

== Early life and education ==
Jane Hart was born in White Plains, New York.

At the age of 18, Hart enrolled in the Academy Psychopolis in the Netherlands, where she studied in 1976. She returned to the United States the following year, where she obtained her associate degree from Miami-Dade College in Miami, Florida.

In 1978, Hart began attending the School of Visual Arts in New York, where she pursued her bachelor's degree until 1979. She continued her studies towards a BFA in 1980, at the University of Miami.

== Professional career ==
=== 1980–1990: Miami, New York, and London ===
Hart began her art career first as a gallery director, at the Moos Gallery in Miami, where she worked in that capacity from 1980 to 1982.

Afterward, she returned to New York, where she was at the Piezo Electric Gallery until 1984, before moving to London, where she took a position as assistant director in the Angela Flowers Gallery through 1985.

Subsequently, she worked at Marlborough Fine Art in New York until 1990, designing numerous publications for many of the gallery's artists. Upon leaving Marlborough, she moved to Los Angeles, where she remained for over a decade.

=== 1990–2003: Los Angeles ===
In Los Angeles, Hart served from 1990 to 1992 as an assistant director at the L.A. Louver Gallery, where she helped organize significant projects of Wallace Berman, Kienholz, and Jimmie Durham. From 1992 to 1994, Hart worked as international sales director at Gemini G.E.L., an artists' workshop and publisher of limited edition prints and sculptures.

As director at the fine arts publisher Muse [x] Editions from 1994 to 1999, she worked with artists such as Doug Aitken, John Baldessari, Uta Barth, Gregory Crewdson, Lyle Ashton Harris, Mike Kelley, Christian Marclay, Catherine Opie, Diana Thater, Pae White, and Andrea Zittel.

Hart has written pieces for a variety of art publications including Artnet, the Journal of Contemporary Art, Miami New Times, and Zing: A Curatorial Crossing. These have included an interview with Antony Gormley, reviews of exhibitions by Jim Hodges, Martin Kersels, and Eve Andrée Laramée, as well as specially curated projects and other articles.

From 1996 to the present, Hart has been the sole proprietor at lemon sky, which she founded in 1996 and ran in Los Angeles through 2003 before relocating to Miami.

=== 2003–present ===
Lemon sky is a contemporary fine art gallery and editions publisher. Since its original founding, lemon sky received coverage in a variety of internationally distributed contemporary fine art limited edition periodicals including ARTFORUM, Artnet, The Contemporary, and others.

Concurrently from 2007 to 2015, Hart was curator of exhibitions for the Art and Culture Center in Hollywood, Florida. She was named Best Curator in 2011 and again in 2015 by New Times Magazine in its annual "Best of" issue, working with artists from the region and elsewhere, organizing fundraisers and guest lectures.

A show of LEGO artist Nathan Sawaya organized by Hart in 2010 was the center's most well-attended exhibition, attracting 13,000 viewers in eight weeks. During her tenure as curator, Hart curated over one hundred exhibitions, including shows by José Alvarez (D.O.P.A.), Aline Kominsky-Crumb, Dave Muller, Charles M. Schulz, TM Sisters, Ed Templeton, Wayne White, and Agustina Woodgate. Notable among the exhibits was the 2011 show "Artist Unknown/The Free World" featuring vernacular photography of hundreds of images selected by the artists, John D. Monteith and Oliver Wasow. A book, which accompanied the exhibition, includes texts by Hart, the artists, and art historians Jerry Saltz and Marvin Heiferman.

In 2015, Hart returned to focus on independent curating. Among other exhibitions, she organized a multi-venue exhibition and book (published by [NAME] Publications,) "100+ Degrees in the Shade: A Survey of South Florida Art," spotlighting the work of more than 170 South Florida artists. From August 2015 to January 2017, she curated three concurrent exhibits at the Hilliard Museum of Art in Lafayette, Louisiana, focusing on, respectively, contemporary portraiture by Louisiana artists; the "COMUS" series of portraits by Francie Bishop Good; and studio portraits by Oliver Wasow.

In January 2017, Hart curated the exhibition "Champions: Caribbean Artists Breaking Boundaries in South Florida," which ran through February 11, 2017, at the Armory Art Center in West Palm Beach, Florida. This exhibition featured a selection of Caribbean artists living in South Florida, highlighting them through the narratives of their art, working in a broad spectrum of mediums.

In November 2017, Hart curated an exhibition titled "SIXTH" at Miami's non-profit gallery Bridge Red, exploring how artists are increasingly exploring issues of critical environmentalism.

== Publications ==
- Exhibition catalog "A Vital Matrix" (domestic setting gallery, Los Angeles, CA) 1995 text by Tobey Crockett
- Exhibition catalog "a scattering matrix" (Richard Heller Gallery, Santa Monica, CA) 1998 texts by Tobey Crockett, Jane Hart, Klaus Ottmann
- TJ Ahearn JUKEBOX, 2009, text by Gean Moreno
- "Artist Unknown/The Free World" 2011 (accompanied exhibition at Art and Culture Center of Hollywood) texts by Jane Hart, Marvin Heiferman, John D. Monteith, Jerry Saltz, Oliver Wasow, published by [NAME] Publications ISBN 9780615478944
- "100+ Degrees In The Shade: A Survey of South Florida Art," 2015, (multi-venue exhibition) texts by Erica Ando, Sandra Schulman, and Jane Hart, published by [NAME] Publications ISBN 0692548955
