= William Howard Hart =

American painter

- Born: 1863; Fishkill, New York, U.S.
- Died: 1937 (aged 73–74); New York City, U.S.
- Occupation: Painter

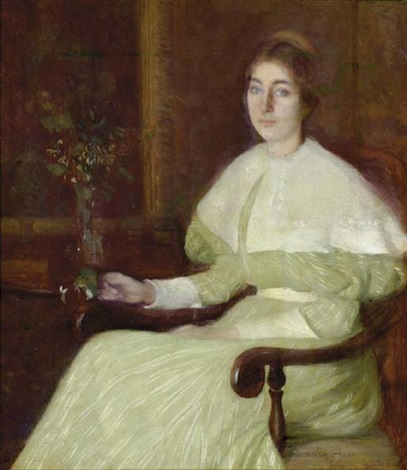
Portrait of Adeline Pond Adams by Hart.

William Howard Hart (1863-1937) was an American painter.
