= William Hart (Medal of Honor) =

- Born: June 9, 1866; Massachusetts, US
- Died: February 6, 1899 (aged 32)
- Military career
- Allegiance: United States
- Branch: United States Navy
- Rank: Machinist First Class
- Unit: U.S.S. Marblehead
- Conflicts: Spanish–American War
- Awards: Medal of Honor

William Hart (June 9, 1866 – February 6, 1899) was a machinist first class serving in the United States Navy during the Spanish–American War who received the Medal of Honor for bravery.

== Biography ==
Hart was born June 9, 1866, in Massachusetts and after entering the navy was sent to fight in the Spanish–American War aboard the torpedo boat U.S.S. Marblehead as a machinist first class.

He died February 6, 1899.

== Medal of Honor citation ==
Rank and organization: Machinist First Class, U.S. Navy. Born: 9 June 1866, Massachusetts. Accredited to: Massachusetts. G.O. No.: 521, 7 July 1899.

Citation:

On board the U.S.S. Marblehead during the operation of cutting the cable leading from Cienfuegos, Cuba, 11 May 1898. Facing the heavy fire of the enemy, Hart set an example of extraordinary bravery and coolness throughout this action.

== See also ==
- List of Medal of Honor recipients for the Spanish–American War
