= Bill Hart (footballer) =

English footballer (1923–1990)

Personal information
- Full name: William Robert Hart
- Date of birth: 1 April 1923
- Place of birth: North Shields, England
- Date of death: March 1990 (aged 66)
- Place of death: North Tyneside, England
- Position: Right half

Youth career
- Newcastle United

Senior career*
Years	Team	Apps	(Gls)
1946–1947	Chesterfield	1	(0)
1947–1949	Bradford City	25	(0)
Total		26	(0)
- * Club domestic league appearances and goals

William Robert Hart (1 April 1923 – March 1990) was an English professional footballer who played as a right half.

== Career ==
Born in North Shields, Hart played for Newcastle United, Chesterfield and Bradford City.

For Bradford City he made 25 appearances in the Football League.

== Sources ==
- Frost, Terry (1988). Bradford City A Complete Record 1903-1988. Breedon Books Sport. ISBN 0-907969-38-0.
