= Fred J. Hart (politician) =

American politician and businessman

Fred J. Hart (March 8, 1906 – August 8, 1983) was an American businessman and politician.

Born in Streator, Illinois, he went to the public schools there and to Rice University in Houston, Texas. Hart worked in the bank and loan business in Streator. He served as the city clerk from 1931 to 1938 and as the LaSalle County Treasurer from 1938 to 1942.

A Republican, Hart served in the Illinois House of Representatives from 1943 to 1950 and in the Illinois Senate from 1951 to 1966. He died at his home in Streator at age 77.
