= Rufus Erastus Hart =

American politician

- Born: September 10, 1812; Middlebury, Ohio, U.S.
- Died: December 24, 1891 (aged 79); Marietta, Ohio, U.S.
- Occupations: Lawyer, politician

Rufus Erastus Hart (September 10, 1812 – December 24, 1891) was an American politician and lawyer who served a term in the Ohio Senate, from 1845 to 1847, and was head of the Ohio Asylum for the Blind in Columbus from 1852 to 1856.

== Early life and education ==
Hart, the son of Joseph and Anna (Hotchkiss) Hart, was born in Middlebury, Ohio, on September 10, 1812. His father was a sea captain from Connecticut and died in 1813; Joseph Hart is considered the founder of Middlebury. Hart graduated from Yale College in 1833. He studied law at home from 1833 to 1835, and then began practice in Akron, Ohio.

== Career ==
In the fall of 1837, Hart moved to Marietta, where he spent the rest of his life, except for the years from 1852 to 1856, when he served as the principal of the Ohio Asylum for the Blind in Columbus. He was a member of the Ohio Senate from 1845 to 1847.

== Personal life ==
Hart married Julia Holden in 1839; they had three sons and three daughters. Hart died in Marietta, from an attack of the prevailing influenza, on December 24, 1891 at the age of 80.
