= William Hart (priest) =

English Roman Catholic priest and martyr

Blessed William Hart

Martyr
- Born: c. 1558; Wells, Somerset, England
- Died: 15 March 1583 (aged 24 - 25); York, England
- Venerated in: Roman Catholic Church
- Beatified: 29 December 1886 by Pope Leo XIII
- Feast: 15 March
- Attributes: Martyr's palm, noose in neck, knife

William Hart (born at Wells, 1558; executed at York, 15 March 1583) was an English Roman Catholic priest and martyr who was beatified in 1886.

== Life ==
Elected Trappes Scholar at Lincoln College, Oxford, 25 May 1571, he supplicated B.A., 18 June 1574. The same year he followed the rector, John Bridgewater, to Douai College. He accompanied the college to Reims, and returned there after a serious operation for kidney stones on 22 November 1578 at Namur. He took the college oath at the English College, Rome, on 23 April 1579, where he was ordained priest. On 26 March 1581, he left Rome, arriving at Reims on 13 May, and resuming his journey on 22 May.

On reaching England he worked on a ministry in Yorkshire, frequently visiting imprisoned Catholics, providing comfort and whatever assistance he was able. He was present at the Mass at York Castle at which William Lacy was captured, and escaped by getting down the wall and wading through the moat up to his chin.

Betrayed by an apostate Catholic on Christmas Day, 1582, he was arrested while asleep in bed. Hart was thrown into an underground dungeon, he was put into double irons. After examination before the Dean of York and the Council of the North, he was arraigned at the Lent Assizes.

The account of his trial states that he was arraigned on two counts and found guilty, namely:

1. under 13 Eliz. 1. c. 3, for having gone abroad without royal licence; and
2. under the Religion Act 1580, for having reconciled John Wright and one Couling to the Catholic Church.

Although the authorities tried to prevent it, a number of Catholics present were able to carry away various relics of his bones and portions of his clothes, which they kept with great veneration.
