= Deaths in June 1986 =

The following is a list of notable deaths in June 1986.

Entries for each day are listed alphabetically by surname. A typical entry lists information in the following sequence:

- Name, age, country of citizenship at birth, subsequent country of citizenship (if applicable), reason for notability, cause of death (if known), and reference.

== June 1986 ==
=== 1 ===
- Dame Margaret Blackwood, 77, Australian botanist and geneticist.
- Emery Blagdon, 78, American artist.
- Jo Gartner, 32, Austrian racing driver, racing crash.
- Alex Gorgal, 86, Polish-born American NFL football player.
- Manuel Gouveia, 62, Portuguese Olympic gymnast (1952).
- Ernst Hack, 39, Austrian Olympic wrestler (1972).
- Mason Hoffenberg, 63, American writer, lung cancer.
- Floyd Johnson, 85, American boxer.
- Noel Jones, 66, Australian rugby league footballer.
- Anděla Kozáková-Jírová, 89, Czech lawyer.
- Herschel Levit, 74, American artist.
- Rudolf Sonneborn, 87, American oil executive.
- George Tapper, 69, American politician, member of the Florida House of Representatives (1947–1951) and Senate (1953–1956, 1965).
- Charles F. Wennerstrum, 96, American jurist.
- Edmund Wood, 83, English footballer.

=== 2 ===
- Stanley Corrsin, 66, American physicist.
- T. S. Durairaj, 75, Indian filmmaker.
- Jimmy Grafton, 70, English screenwriter and theatre agent.
- Hartmann Grasser, 71, German flying ace.
- Arthur Hoérée, 89, Belgian musicologist.
- Aurèle Joliat, 84, Canadian NHL ice hockey player.
- Lya Lys, 78, German-born American actress, heart failure.
- Fay Marbe, 87, American actress.
- Wendell H. Meade, 74, American politician, member of the U.S. House of Representatives (1947–1949).
- Nanha, 43, Pakistani actor and comedian, suicide by gunshot.
- Frank Upchurch, 92, American politician, member of the Florida Senate (1943).
- Peter Wilson, 79, New Zealand cricketer.

=== 3 ===
- Ted Bank, 88, American football player and coach.
- Aloys Bigirumwami, 81, Rwandan Roman Catholic prelate.
- Colin English, 90, American academic administrator.
- John Gilmour, 79, British botanist.
- Grace Wyndham Goldie, 86, British television producer.
- Robert La Tourneaux, 45, American actor, AIDS.
- Max Munk, 95, German-American aerospace engineer.
- Dame Anna Neagle, 81, English actress.
- Louie De Votie Newton, 94, American Baptist leader.
- Jack Orrison, 76, American actor and screenwriter.
- Michael Taylor, 59, American interior designer.
- Frans Van Dessel, 75, Belgian footballer.
- Patricia Wheel, 60, American actress.

=== 4 ===
- Frederick Chauncy, 81, British Olympic hurdler (1928).
- Dame Helen Gardner, 78, English literary critic.
- Charles Harrison, 71, Australian politician.
- Ahmad Saeed Kazmi, 73, Pakistani Islamic scholar.
- Tom Lee, 66, American politician, member of the New Mexico Senate (1967–1978).
- Vladas Mieželis, 91, Soviet Lithuanian general.
- Clifford Mollison, 89, British actor.
- Len Scott, 79, New Zealand rugby league player.
- Paul Stevens, 65, American actor, pneumonia.

=== 5 ===
- Dolly Akers, 85, American politician.
- John Francis Bannon, 80–81, American historian.
- John Bevan, 38, Welsh rugby player, cancer.
- Fanny Buss, 76, New Zealand fashion designer.
- Robert DiBernardo, 49, American mobster (Gambino crime family), shot.
- Bryan Grant, 76, American tennis player.
- Helmut Grunsky, 81, German mathematician.
- Sybil Kennedy, 86, Canadian sculptor.
- Alexander Lipmann-Kessel, 71, South African surgeon.
- Henri Michel, 79, French historian.
- Togo Mizrahi, 85, Egyptian actor and filmmaker.
- Joe Mulligan, 72, American Major League baseball player (Boston Red Sox).
- Andor Ónody, 65, Hungarian football player and manager.
- Arthur Pink, 85, Australian rules footballer.
- Ernie Roderick, 72, British boxer.
- Wim Schuhmacher, 92, Dutch painter and designer.
- Lisa Ullrich, 85, German politician.
- Jesse Winters, 92, American Major League baseball player.

=== 6 ===
- John Carmichael, 83, American sports journalist.
- George Fazio, 73, American golfer.
- Joseph Fischer, 77, Luxembourgish footballer.
- Dennis Grainger, 66, English footballer.
- Petrus Hugo, 68, South African flying ace.
- Masti Venkatesha Iyengar, 95, Indian writer.
- William Joynt, 97, Australian author and soldier, VC recipient.
- Valentyn Rechmedin, 70, Soviet Ukrainian journalist.
- Dick Rowe, 64, British record producer.
- Henry Nash Smith, 79, American literary scholar.
- Robert Stuart, 77, Argentine cricketer.
- Johnnie Tolan, 68, American racing driver.
- Ramón Torralba, 90, Spanish footballer.
- Annes Varjun, 78, Estonian ceramicist.
- Grinton I. Will, 83, American librarian.
- Tony Wright, 60, English actor.

=== 7 ===
- Lloyd M. Bradfield, 85, American football and basketball coach.
- James Fifer, 55, American Olympic rower (1956).
- Georges Halbout, 90, French sculptor.
- Brooks Holder, 71, American baseball player.
- Jan Kavan, 81, Czech sculptor.
- Morice Lipsi, 88, French sculptor.
- Ralph Pickford, 83, English psychologist.
- Pilloo Pochkhanawala, 63, Indian sculptor, cancer.
- Sara Sadíqova, 79, Soviet actress and singer.
- Taungpulu Kaba-Aye Sayadaw, 89, Burmese Buddhist monk.

=== 8 ===
- Harold Abbott, 79, Australian painter.
- Anthony Turner Andreasen, 79, British surgeon.
- Harry Frederick Baker, 81, Australian aviator and motorcycle racer.
- Thomas Burrow, 76, British Indologist.
- F. Curtis Canfield, 82, American theatre director.
- Elsa Gidlow, 87, British-born Canadian-American writer.
- Vernon Loton, 80, Australian cricketer.
- Edward Montgomery, 79, Australian politician.

=== 9 ===
- Arnaldo Benfenati, 62, Italian racing cyclist.
- Matilde Díaz Vélez, 86, Argentine philanthropist.
- Ilona Harima, 75, Finnish artist.
- Edwin Kuh, 61, American economist.
- Ernst Peschl, 79, German mathematician.
- Milton Richman, 64, American sports journalist, heart attack.
- Elisabeth Selbert, 89, German politician and lawyer.
- Karl Skytte, 78, Danish politician.
- Tony Starcer, 66, American soldier and artist.
- Glan Williams, 74, British caricaturist.

=== 10 ===
- Emilio de los Santos, 82, Dominican politician, president of the Dominican Republic (1963).
- Franc Hale, 79–81, American actress.
- Merle Miller, 67, American writer.
- Edgar Petersen, 82, German fighter pilot.
- Louis Risacher, 91, French flying ace.
- Edward Sagarin, 72, American sociologist, heart attack.
- Dick Sudirman, 64, Indonesian badminton player.
- Dennis Thompson, 61, English footballer.
- Reginald Lawson Waterfield, 86, British astronomer.
- William C. White, 89, American football coach.
- Samuel Zauber, 85, Romanian footballer.

=== 11 ===
- James Amster, 77, American interior decorator, leukemia.
- Chesley Bonestell, 98, American painter.
- Marcantonio Bragadin, 79, Italian naval admiral.
- Porter Charleston, 82, American baseball player.
- Frank Cousins, 81, British politician, MP (1965–1966).
- Reed De Rouen, 69, American actor and screenwriter.
- Alfred Goulder, 78, English cricketer.
- John J. Kinzer, 95, American politician.
- Robert K. Ottum, 61, American sports journalist, cancer.
- Jim Trueman, 51, American businessman and racing team owner, colon cancer.

=== 12 ===
- Jackie Burns, 79, English footballer.
- Pierce H. Deamer Jr., 79, American politician, member of the New Jersey State Senate (1962–1966).
- Harry Hanson, 85, Swedish Olympic sailor (1928).
- Edward Henderson, 76, English Anglican prelate.
- Harry Houghton, 85, British Olympic athlete (1924, 1928).
- Zdeněk Koubek, 72, Czech track athlete.
- Bill Miller, 77, Canadian ice hockey player (Montreal Maroons, Montreal Canadiens).
- Gerti Pertlwieser, 61, Austrian slalom canoeist.
- Geoffrey Raphael, 76, English cricketer.
- Naboua Ratieta, 48, I-Kiribati politician.
- William Byron Rumford, 78, American politician.
- Seonu Hwi, 64, South Korean novelist.
- Basil Snell, 79, British Anglican prelate.
- Murray Van Wagoner, 88, American politician, governor of Michigan (1941–1943).
- John Steven Watson, 70, English historian and academic administrator.

=== 13 ===
- Frank Abruzzino, 78, American NFL football player.
- R. Bintoro, 61, Indonesian general.
- Eugene Brodhagen, 68, American football and wrestling coach.
- Deep Diver, 17, British Thoroughbred racehorse.
- Wilfrid Eggleston, 85, British-Canadian journalist.
- Jim Ferrier, 71, Australian-American golfer.
- Benny Goodman, 77, American bandleader and swing musician, heart attack.
- Dana McLean Greeley, 77, American Unitarian leader.
- Harlan N. Hartness, 88, American general.
- John Jerome Hill, 67, American politician.
- Tom Klose, 68, Australian cricketer.
- Dean Reed, 47, American-East German singer and actor, drowned.
- Ulla Strömstedt, 46, Swedish actress.
- Carl O. Wegner, 88, American politician.
- Adam Yacenda, 70, American political advisor and newspaper publisher.

=== 14 ===
- Dimitrije Bogdanović, 55, Yugoslav historian.
- Jaap Boot, 83, Dutch Olympic athlete (1924).
- Jorge Luis Borges, 86, Argentine writer, liver cancer.
- Mushy Callahan, 80, American boxer.
- James A. Cullimore, 80, American Mormon leader.
- John Daley, 80, English cricketer.
- Joan Eyles, 78, British geologist.
- Ben Field, 85, American novelist.
- David Kalstone, 52–53, American literary critic, AIDS.
- Kim Swoo-geun, 55, South Korean architect.
- Alan Jay Lerner, 67, American lyricist, lung cancer.
- Denis McGrath, 75, New Zealand politician and lawyer.
- Norbert Nuttelman, 75, American politician.
- Giorgio Pellini, 62, Italian Olympic fencer (1948, 1952).
- Marlin Perkins, 81, American zoologist (Wild Kingdom), lymphatic cancer.
- Robert Presnell Jr., 71, American screenwriter.
- Settimio Simonini, 72, Italian racing cyclist.
- Karl Söllner, 83, Austrian-American chemist.
- Anthony Spilotro, 48, American mobster, blunt force trauma.
- Michael Spilotro, 41, American mobster, blunt force trauma.

=== 15 ===
- Choi Yong-sool, 81, South Korean martial artist, founder of Hapkido.
- Frank Dickens, 86, English biochemist.
- Francis Galtier, 79, French Olympic sprinter (1924).
- Sambhu Ghosh, 59, Indian politician.
- Willie Hoel, 65, Norwegian actor.
- William Howard Melish, 76, American social leader and Anglican priest.
- Otto Rathsman, 68, Swedish diplomat.
- Walter V. Schaefer, 81, American jurist.
- Werner Streib, 75, German flying ace.
- Keki Tarapore, 75, Indian cricketer.
- Rini Templeton, 50, American artist.
- Donald Tye, 73, American baseball player.

=== 16 ===
- Christian Beullac, 62, French politician.
- Danny Clapton, 51, English footballer.
- Lady Diana Cooper, 93, English actress and aristocrat.
- Maurice Duruflé, 84, French composer.
- Joe Greene, 71, American songwriter, kidney failure.
- John Hayes, 88, Australian politician.
- Léon Lippens, 74, Belgian naturalist.
- Erlendur Patursson, 72, Faroese politician.
- George Pearce, 77, English cricketer.
- Juanchín Ramírez, 80, Puerto Rican musician.
- Luisa Sala, 62, Spanish actress, choked.
- Joginder Sen, 81, Indian politician and diplomat.

=== 17 ===
- Anahareo, 79, Canadian animal rights activist.
- William Attaway, 74, American author, heart failure.
- Leonardo Borgese, 81, Italian painter.
- Prink Callison, 86, American football player and coach.
- Edward Francis Cavanagh Jr., 79, American firefighter.
- Rick Concannon, 78, American NFL football player.
- Ted J. Kent, 84, American film editor.
- Desiderio Medina, 66, Chilean footballer.
- Gilbert Raynes, 82, British Olympic gymnast (1928).
- Felipe Rosas, 76, Mexican footballer.
- Kate Smith, 79, American singer, respiratory arrest.
- Joseph Stone, Baron Stone, 83, British physician.
- Harold W. Tribble, 86, American academic administrator.
- Archie Wood, 60, Scottish footballer.
- Domingo Zaldúa, 82, Spanish footballer.

=== 18 ===
- Albert Anderson, 78, Northern Irish politician.
- Ara Bekaryan, 73, Soviet Armenian painter.
- Frances Scott Fitzgerald, 64, American writer, throat cancer.
- Walter Gilbert, 87, Canadian-American pilot.
- Sonja Johnsson, 90, Swedish Olympic swimmer (1912).
- Sidney Lens, 74, American political activist and author, melanoma.
- Khandavalli Lakshmi Ranjanam, 78, Indian writer.
- Floyd Van Nest Schultz, 75, American electrical engineer.
- Frederick Spence, 84, South African cricketer.
- Charles Twigg, 93, English-born South African cricketer.
- Jack Wagener, 81, English cricketer.

=== 19 ===
- Bentot, 65, Filipino comedian, heart failure.
- Len Bias, 22, American basketball player, cocaine overdose.
- Jean Bonhomme, 49, Canadian tenor
- Lindley Bothwell, 84, American agriculturalist.
- Coluche, 41, French comedian and actor, traffic collision.
- Nelson Cruikshank, 83, American labor activist.
- Antonio Díaz Martínez, 53, Peruvian communist activist, shot.
- Lidiya Khaindrova, 76, Soviet poet.
- Ryuichi Matsuda, 65, Japanese entomologist.
- Paulina Radziulytė, 81, Soviet Lithuanian-American basketball player and Olympic runner (1928).
- Jules-Jean Ravel, 85, French politician.
- Norb Sacksteder, 90, American NFL football player.
- Sir Shiu-kin Tang, 85, Hong Kong businessman and philanthropist.
- Ronald L. Thompson, 86, American politician.
- Alfred Vagts, 93, German-American historian and poet.
- William Webster, 76, English cricketer.

=== 20 ===
- Peter Boughey, 74, British special agent.
- H. G. Cochran, 62, American prison warden and politician.
- David Vivian Currie, 73, Canadian soldier.
- The Duke of Paducah, 85, American comedian and banjoist.
- Julie Duncan, 67, American actress.
- Richard Eybner, 90, Austrian actor.
- Joseph Forer, 75, American attorney.
- Tim Herbert, 71, American actor, heart attack.
- Roy Shepherd, 78–79, Australian pianist.
- Wisse Alfred Pierre Smit, 82, Dutch poet and literary historian.
- Béla Szepes, 82, Hungarian Olympic skier and athlete (1924, 1928).
- William Horace Taylor, 96, Canadian politician, MP (1926–1945).

=== 21 ===
- Ivan Burenin, 89, Soviet general.
- Cathal Coughlan, 48, Irish politician, TD (since 1983).
- Roger Drayton, 61, New Zealand politician, MP (1969–1978).
- Lloyd Espenschied, 97, American electrical engineer.
- Georges Garreau, 83, French Olympic diver (1924).
- Archduchess Margaretha of Austria, 92, Austrian royal.
- Helge Miettunen, 69, Finnish politician.
- Helmut Petri, 78, German anthropologist.
- Arnie Portocarrero, 54, American Major League baseball player.
- Assi Rahbani, 63, Lebanese musician.
- Jimmy Tays, 87, American NFL player.

=== 22 ===
- Mary Anderson, 88, American actress.
- Alpheus Deane, 69, American baseball player.
- Joséphine Thérèse Koster, 83, Dutch botanist.
- Urban Odson, 67, American NFL football player.
- William J. Scott, 59, American politician, heart attack.
- Luciano Sderci, 61, Italian violin maker.
- Rufus Stokes, 61, American mechanic and inventor, mesothelioma.
- Martin Thornton, 70, English theologian.
- Pauline Vinson, 70, American artist.
- Robert F. Young, 71, American science fiction writer.

=== 23 ===
- Geraldine Aves, 87, British civil servant and social reformist.
- Marko Čelebonović, 83, Yugoslav painter.
- Renato De Sanzuane, 61, Italian Olympic water polo player (1952).
- Alfred Paul Dorjahn, 91, American classicist.
- Sir Moses Finley, 74, American-born British classical scholar, stroke.
- Jerzy Putrament, 75, Polish writer and politician.
- Charles Ritchie Russell, Baron Russell of Killowen, 78, British jurist.
- Kåre Siem, 72, Norwegian musician.
- Nigel Stock, 66, British actor.

=== 24 ===
- Mika Antić, 54, Yugoslav film director and poet.
- Liliane Barrard, 37–38, French mountaineer, hypoxia.
- Maurice Barrard, 44–45, French mountaineer, hypoxia.
- Tove Birkelund, 57, Danish geologist.
- Ray Bomba, 79, American sound editor.
- Sidney M. Cadwell, 93, American polymer scientist.
- Elwood Engel, 69, American vehicle designer.
- Thomas M. Fitzpatrick, 95, American football and basketball player and coach.
- Loy Hanning, 68, American Major League baseball player.
- George Howe, 86, English actor.
- Ján Kroner, 59, Czechoslovak actor.
- Jesse Marcel, 79, American Air Force colonel, investigator of the Roswell incident.
- Ximena McGlashan, 92, American entomologist.
- Lodovico Rocca, 90, Italian composer.
- Annabelle Terhune, 82, American journalist.
- Rex Warner, 81, English classicist.
- Dennis Ziadie, 39, Jamaican footballer, traffic collision.

=== 25 ===
- Laurie Fishlock, 79, English cricketer.
- Francis J. Galbraith, 72, American diplomat.
- Kazimierz Gzowski, 84, Polish Olympic equestrian (1928).
- Gwilym Kessey, 67, Australian cricketer.
- A. J. Lockhart, 88, American baseball player.
- Gabriel Lozès, 68, Beninese politician, diplomat and physician.
- Clarence C. Mitchell, 89, American politician.
- Reinhold Münzenberg, 77, German footballer.
- Ivan Sabolić, 64, Yugoslav sculptor.
- Jenifer Strait, 13, daughter of country music singer George Strait.
- Dame Mary Welsh, 89, British military personnel.

=== 26 ===
- Sanford Brown, 77, American politician.
- Aimé Deolet, 80, Belgian racing cyclist.
- Gong Zutong, 81, Chinese optical physicist.
- William Lovelock, 87, English composer.
- Kunio Maekawa, 81, Japanese architect.
- Ed Molinski, 68, American football player.
- Sir Jock Pagan, 72, Australian politician and businessman.
- Sid Plunkett, 65, English footballer.
- Stewart W. Proudfoot, 77, Canadian politician.
- Ruth Roach, 89–90, American rodeo equestrian.
- Charles Rogers, 84, American NFL football player and coach.
- Andriy Skaba, 80, Soviet Ukrainian academic and historian.
- Teiji Takai, 75, Japanese painter.
- Väino Tamm, 55, Estonian interior designer.
- Seif el-Din el-Zoubi, 72–73, Israeli politician.

=== 27 ===
- Nellie Weldon Cocroft, 100, American composer.
- Edna Mae Cooper, 85, American actress.
- Zoltán Gárdonyi, 80, Hungarian composer.
- Charles Jordan, 71, Canadian singer.
- Winnie Lodrigues, 75, American college football player and coach.
- Joe Maphis, 65, American guitarist, lung cancer.
- Jock McNaughton, 74, Scottish footballer.
- Bill Miller, 50, Australian rules footballer.
- Don Rogers, 23, American NFL football player, cocaine overdose.
- Albert Wiesener, 84, Norwegian lawyer.

=== 28 ===
- Pearly Brown, 70, American singer and guitarist.
- Haji Mohammad Danesh, 86, Bangladeshi politician.
- Gilberte Géniat, 70, French actress.
- Yvonne Hakim-Rimpel, 79–80, Haitian journalist and feminist, heart attack.
- Frank Jewett, 69, American Olympic sailor (1936).
- Marjorie Tuite, 63, American social activist, pancreatic cancer.

=== 29 ===
- Thomas Albright, 76, American baseball player.
- Mario Amaya, 52, American museum director, AIDS.
- Lako Bodra, 66, Indian writer and linguist.
- Jack Christiansen, 57, American NFL Hall of Fame player (Detroit Lions).
- Walter Early Craig, 77, American jurist.
- Robert Drivas, 50, American actor, AIDS.
- John Porter East, 55, American politician, member of the U.S. Senate (since 1981), suicide by carbon monoxide poisoning.
- Dusolina Giannini, 83, American-Swiss singer.
- Clair L. Gleason, 63, American college sports coach (Sterling College).
- Jacques Hélian, 74, French orchestra conductor.
- Tiko Jelisavčić, 56–57, Yugoslav football player and coach.
- Wendell P. Kay, 72, American politician.
- Earl Landgrebe, 70, American politician, member of the U.S. House of Representatives (1969–1975), heart attack.
- Edward D. MacArthur, 66, Canadian politician.
- Kyaw Nyein, 73, Burmese politician.
- Dan Pagis, 55, Israeli poet, cancer.
- Sir Desmond Pond, 66, British psychiatrist.
- Siddiqur Rahman, 34, Bangladeshi politician.
- Robert Ryder, 78, British soldier, VC recipient, and politician, MP (1950–1955).
- Kenyon Taylor, 78, English electrical engineer.
- Cliff Townshend, 70, English saxophonist.
- Wirt Williams, 64, American journalist and novelist.
- Frank Wise, 89, Australian politician.

=== 30 ===
- Fernando Ansola, 46, Spanish footballer.
- Thomas Barger, 77, American geologist and businessman.
- Jack Beveridge, 79, Australian rules footballer.
- Pierre Costantini, 97, French soldier and journalist.
- Horst Förster, 66, German conductor.
- Margalo Gillmore, 89, English-born American actress, cancer.
- Guan Zilan, 83, Chinese painter.
- Roman Gul, 89, Russian-American writer.
- Soichi Ichida, 75, Japanese philatelist.
- László Lékai, 76, Hungarian Roman Catholic cardinal.
- Mauricio Magdaleno, 80, Mexican filmmaker.
- Marjorie Matthews, 70, American Methodist bishop, breast cancer.
- Juan Alberto Montes, 83, Argentine historian.
- Iris Noble, 64, Canadian-American biographer.
- Almeda Riddle, 87, American singer.
- Ernst Sabeditsch, 66, Austrian footballer.
