= Rufina (name) =

- Gender: female

Origin
- Origin: Italian/Latin/Greek/Spanish/Russian
- Meaning: "red-haired"

Other names
- Related names: Rufus

Rufina (\r(u)-fi-na\) is a female given name and surname, meaning "red-haired". It is claimed to be of Latin, Greek, Italian, Russian or Spanish origin. As a first name, it is the female equivalent of Rufus.

== People ==
- Claudia Rufina, a woman of British descent who lived in Rome c. 90 AD
- Rufina of Smyrna, (fl. 2nd–3rd century), a Jewish woman known only from a single funerary inscription
- Rufina of Rome (died 257), a Christian martyr venerated as a saint
- Rufina of Caesarea, a 3rd-century Christian martyr
- Rufina of Seville (270–287), a Christian martyr venerated as a saint
- Rufina Alfaro, a possibly legendary figure in the Panamanian independence movement
- Rufina Amaya (1943–2007), sole survivor of the El Mozote massacre
- Rufina Gasheva (1921–2012), a Soviet aviator during World War II
- Rufina Nifontova (1931–1994), a member of the Communist Party of the Soviet Union from 1972
- Rufina Pukhova (1932–2021), a Russian memoir writer
- Rufina Ubah (born 1959), a former Nigerian sprinter who specialised in the 100 metres
