= Rufus Hardy =

Rufus Hardy may refer to:

- Rufus Hardy (representative) (1855–1943), member of the U.S. House of Representatives from Texas
- Rufus K. Hardy (1878–1945), leader and missionary in The Church of Jesus Christ of Latter-day Saints

== See also ==
- Hardy (disambiguation)
- Rufus, a set index article about the name Rufus
- Hardy (surname)
