= Rufus =

Rufus is a masculine given name, a surname, an Ancient Roman cognomen and a nickname (from Latin rufus, "red"). Notable people with the name include:

== Given name ==
=== Politicians ===
- Marcus Caelius Rufus, (28 May 82 BC – after 48 BC), orator and politician in the late Roman Republic
- Rufus Ada George (born 1940), Nigerian politician
- Rufus Aladesanmi III (born 1945), Yoruban king
- Rufus Applegarth (1844–1921), American lawyer and politician
- Rufus A. Ayers (1849–1926), American lawyer, businessman, and politician
- Rufus Barringer (1821–1895), American lawyer, politician, and military general
- Rufus Blodgett (1834–1910), American politician and railroad superintendent
- Rufus Bousquet (born 1958), Saint Lucian politician
- Rufus E. Brown (1854–1920), Vermont attorney, farmer, and politician
- Rufus Bullock (1834–1907), American politician
- Rufus Carter (1866–1932), Canadian farmer and political figure
- Rufus Cheney Jr., member of the Wisconsin State Assembly during the 1850 session
- Rufus W. Cobb (1829–1913), American politician
- Rufus Curry (1859–1934), Canadian manufacturer and politician
- Rufus Davis (born 1964), mayor of Camilla, Georgia
- Rufus B. Dodge Jr. (1861–1935), American lawyer and politician
- Rufus A. Doughton (1857–1946), American politician
- Rufus Easton (1774–1834), American lawyer and politician
- Rufus Edmisten (born 1941), American politician and lawyer
- Rufus Elefante (1903–1994), American politician from Utica, New York
- Rufus Nelson England (1851–1911), Canadian merchant and political figure
- Rufus S. Frost (1826–1894), American politician
- Rufus King Garland Jr. (1830–1886), American politician
- Rufus K. Goodenow (1790–1863), American politician
- Rufus Hardy (representative) (1855–1943), American politician
- Rufus Erastus Hart (1812–1891), American politician and lawyer
- Rufus Henderson (1779–1847), Canadian physician, merchant and political figure
- Rufus Isaacs, 1st Marquess of Reading (1860–1935), English politician and jurist
- Rufus King (1755–1827), pre-Civil War US politician
- Rufus H. King (1820–1890), American politician
- Rufus E. Lester (1837–1906), American politician
- Rufus Anderson Lyman (1842–1910), lawyer and politician in the Kingdom of Hawaii
- Rufus Mallory (1831–1914), American educator, lawyer, and politician
- Rufus P. Manson (1830–1897), American politician
- Rufus McIntire (1784–1866), American lawyer, military officer, congressman, and land surveyor
- Rufus Wheeler Peckham (1809–1873), American judge and congressman
- Rufus W. Peckham (1838–1909), American jurist
- Rufus Ferrand Pelletier (1824–?), American postmaster and politician
- Rufus Pettibone (1784–1825), justice of the Supreme Court of Missouri
- Rufus Phillips (1929–2021), American intelligence officer
- Rufus Henry Pope (1857–1944), Canadian politician
- Rufus K. Polk (1866–1902), American politician
- Rufus Pollock (born 1980), English economist
- Rufus P. Ranney (1813–1891), American politician
- Rufus Rodriguez (born 1953), Filipino politician
- Rufus Smith (1766–1844), Canadian physician and politician
- Rufus P. Spalding (1798–1886), American politician, lawyer and judge
- Rufus P. Tapley (1823–1893), justice of the Maine Supreme Judicial Court

=== Religious figures ===
- Rufus (biblical figure), a first-century Christian mentioned in Mark 15:21
- Rufus Anderson (1796–1880), American minister
- Rufus Babcock (1798–1895), American clergyman and academic
- Rufus Brome (born 1935), Bishop of Barbados
- Rufus Hollis Gause (1925–2015), American theologian
- Rufus Halley (c. 1944–2001), Roman Catholic missionary in the Philippines
- Rufus K. Hardy (1878–1945), leader and missionary in The Church of Jesus Christ of Latter-day Saints
- Rufus L. Perry (1834–1895), American educator, journalist, and minister
- Rufus Phineas Stebbins (1810–1885), American clergyman

=== Athletes ===
- Rufus Alexander (born 1983), American football player
- Rufus Bess (born 1956), American football player
- Rufus Brevett (born 1969), English football player
- Rufus Brown (born 1980), American football player
- Rufus Crawford (born 1955), Canadian Football League player
- Rufus Deal (1917–2005), American football player
- Rufus French (born 1978), American football player
- Rufus Gilbert (1885–1962), American football, basketball, and baseball player and coach
- Rufus Granderson (1936–2015), American football player
- Rufus Guthrie (1942–2000), American football player
- Rufus Mayes (1947–1990), American football player
- Rufus Meadows (1907–1970), American baseball player
- Rufus B. Nalley (1870–1902), football, baseball, and track and field player
- Rufus Porter (American football) (born 1965), American football player
- Rufus Sisson (1890–1977), American basketball player
- Rufus Skillern (born 1982), Canadian football player
- Rufus Smith (baseball) (1905–1984), American baseball player

=== Performers ===
- Rufus Beck (born 1957), German theater, film, and voice actor
- Rufus Cappadocia, Canadian-American cellist
- Rufus Carl Gordon, Jr. (1932-2010), commonly known as Carl Gordon, American actor
- Rufus Harley (1936–2006), American jazz musician
- Rufus Hound (born 1979), British comedian
- Rufus Arthur Johnson (born 1976), better known as Bizarre, American rapper
- Rufus Jones (actor) (born 1975), English actor, comedian and writer
- Rufus "Speedy" Jones (1936–1990), American jazz drummer
- Rufus Payne (1883–1939), American blues musician known as Tee Tot
- Rufus Reid (born 1944), American jazz bassist, educator, and composer
- Rufus Sewell (born 1967), British actor
- Rufus C. Somerby (1832–1903), American entertainer, showman, and panoramist
- Rufus Tiger Taylor (born 1991), English musician
- Rufus Thibodeaux (1934–2005), American Cajun fiddler
- Rufus Thomas (1917–2001), American singer
- Rufus P. Turner (1907–1982), American electronics author
- Rufus Wainwright (born 1973), Canadian-American singer-songwriter
- Rufus Waller, better known as Scola, a member of Dru Hill, American singer and musician
- Rufus Skinner, internet horror personality

=== Others ===
- Rufus Travis Amis (1912–2007), American entrepreneur
- Rufus William Bailey (1793–1863), American academic
- Rufus Black (born 1969), Vice-Chancellor of the University of Tasmania
- Rufus Bowen (1947–1978), American professor of mathematics
- Rufus S. Bratton (1892–1958), American intelligence officer
- Rufus Columbus Burleson (1823–1901), American academic
- Rufus T. Bush (1840–1890), American businessman, oil refining industrialist, and yachtsman
- Rufus Choate (1799–1859), American lawyer and orator
- Rufus Early Clement (1900–1967), American academic
- Rufus Cole (1872–1966), American medical doctor
- Rufus Cowles Crampton (1828–1888), American educator
- Rufus Dawes (1838–1899), American military officer
- Rufus C. Dawes (1867–1940), American businessman
- Rufus Dayglo, English comics artist
- Rufus of Ephesus, 1st-century Greco-Roman physician and anatomist
- Rufus Estes (b. 1857 - d.1939), an American chef aboard luxury railway Pullman Company
- J. Rufus Fears (1945–2012), American historian, scholar, teacher and author
- Rufus Fitzgerald (1890–1966), American academic at the University of Pittsburgh
- Rufus Flint (c. 1865 – c. 1895), American Nicaraguan professor of English and mathematics
- Rufus Edward Foster (1871–1942), American jurist
- Rufus Franklin (1916–1975), American criminal
- Rufus Henry Gilbert (1832–1885), American surgeon and inventor
- Rufus Wilmot Griswold (1815–1857), American anthologist, editor, poet, and critic
- Rufus Hannah (1954–2017), aka "Rufus the Stunt Bum", of Bumfights fame
- Rufus Carrollton Harris (1897–1988), American academic
- Rufus G. Herring (1921–1996), American military officer and Medal of Honor winner
- Rufus Hessberg, American doctor and aeromedical scientist
- Rufus C. Holman (1877–1959), American politician and businessman
- Rufus K. Howell (1820–1890), Justice of the Louisiana Supreme Court
- Rufus Hussey (1919–1994), American slingshot marksman
- Rufus Ingalls (1818–1893), American military general
- Rufus Henry Ingram (1834–?), American bushwhacker
- Rufus Isaacs (game theorist) (1914–1981), American mathematician
- Rufus Zenas Johnston (1874–1959), American military officer and Medal of Honor winner
- Rufus Jones (writer) (1863–1948), American writer, philosopher and Quaker
- Rufus R. Jones (1933–1993), American wrestler
- Rufus Keppel, 10th Earl of Albemarle (born 1965), product designer and founder of a men's-shirt company
- Rufus King (general) (1814–1876), American newspaper editor, educator, diplomat, and military general
- Rufus King (writer) (1893–1966), American author of crime novels
- Rufus King Jr. (1838–1900), American military officer
- Rufus B. von KleinSmid (1875–1964), American academic
- Rufus Osgood Mason (1830–1903), American physician, teacher, and researcher in parapsychology and hypnotherapy
- Rufus May (born 1968?), British clinical psychologist
- Rufus McCain (1903–1940), American prisoner at Alcatraz
- Rufus Naylor (1882–1939), Australian sporting entrepreneur and gambler
- Rufus Norris (born 1965), British theatre director
- Rufus Palmer (1828–1873), Canadian physician and political figure
- Rufus Porter (painter) (1792–1884), American painter, inventor, and founder of Scientific American magazine
- Rufus Putnam (1738–1824), American military officer
- Rufus N. Rhodes (1856–1910), American newspaper editor
- Rufus Rockwell Wilson (1865–1949), American journalist and author
- Rufus G. Russell (1823–1896), American architect
- Rufus Sage (1817–1893), American writer, journalist and mountain man
- Rufus Saxton (1824–1908), American military general
- Rufus Stephenson (1835–1901), Canadian newspaper editor and political figure
- Rufus Stokes (1922–1986), American inventor
- Rufus of Thebes, bishop of Thebes in Greece, referenced in Romans 16:13
- Rufus Welch (1800–1856), American circus impresario
- Rufus Corbin Wood (1818–1885), sheriff of Norfolk County, Massachusetts
- Rufus Yerxa (born 1951), American Deputy Director-General of the World Trade Organization
- Rufus Fairchild Zogbaum (1849–1925), American illustrator, journalist and author

== Surname ==
- Alexis Rufus (born 1979), English Muay Thai kickboxer
- Anneli Rufus, American journalist
- Geoffrey Rufus (died 1141), English Bishop and Lord Chancellor
- Milan Rúfus (1928–2009), Slovak poet and writer
- Richard Rufus (born 1975), English football player

== Cognomen or nickname ==
- Rufus (born 1942), stage name of Italian-French actor Jacques Narcy
- Rufus (Roman cognomen), list of people who had one of the most common of the ancient Roman cognomina
- King William II of England (1050s–1100), called "William Rufus"
- Alan Rufus (c. 1040–1089), companion of William the Conqueror
- Richard Rufus of Cornwall (died 1260), English scholastic philosopher and theologian
- Roger Squires, crossword compiler nicknamed Rufus

== Animals ==
- Rufus the Hawk, a bird used to keep pigeons away from the tennis grass courts at Wimbledon

== Objects ==
- the demon core, the plutonium nuclear weapon core that was involved in two deadly nuclear accidents, was originally nicknamed "Rufus"

== Fictional characters ==
- Rufus (Street Fighter), one of four new fighters in Street Fighter IV
- Rufus the Bobcat, the mascot for Ohio University
- Rufus, a naked mole rat from Disney's TV show Kim Possible
- Rufus McCallister, a character in Ninjago
- Rufus Carlin, a main character in the 2016 NBC show Timeless (American TV series)
- Rufus Emeterio, a character in the novel They Both Die at the End
- Rufus Moffat, title character of the book Rufus M. by Eleanor Estes
- Rufus Ruffcut, from Hanna-Barbera's TV show Wacky Races
- Rufus Scrimgeour, from the Harry Potter universe; see Ministry of Magic
- Rufus Shinra, from the Final Fantasy VII video games; see Characters of the Final Fantasy VII series
- Rufus Turner, from the American television drama Supernatural; see List of Supernatural characters
- Rufus XIV, King of Rubovia, in the 1955 British children's television series A Rubovian Legend
- Rufus, from the 1977 animated film The Rescuers
- Rufus, the forgotten 13th apostle in the film Dogma, played by Chris Rock
- Rufus, protagonist of the children's cartoon series The Dreamstone
- Rufus, time traveler in the films Bill & Ted's Excellent Adventure and Bill & Ted's Bogus Journey, played by George Carlin
  - Rufus, time traveler in the television Bill & Ted's Excellent Adventures (1992 TV series), an adaptation of the above film, played by Rick Overton
- Rufus, an anthropomorphic raccoon skin from the 2017 video game Fortnite
- Rufus Humphrey, a character from the television series Gossip Girl
- Rufus, a character in the movie Kill Bill: Volume 2, played by Samuel L. Jackson
- Rufus T. Firefly, a character in the 1933 film Duck Soup, played by Groucho Marx

== See also ==
- Rufus (software)
- Rufus, the shopping AI chatbot for Amazon (company)
- Saint Rufus (disambiguation)
