= John MacNaughton =

John MacNaughton or variant spellings, may refer to:

- John A. MacNaughton (1945–2013), a Canadian investment banker
- John H. MacNaughton (born 1929), an American bishop
- John McNaughton (born 1950), an American film and TV director
- John McNaughton (government official) (1921–1967), American official
- Jock McNaughton (1912–1986), a Scottish professional footballer
- John Macnaghten (1722–1761), known as Half-Hanged MacNaghten, an Anglo-Irish convicted murderer
- Jon McNaughton, an American painter of conservative political themes
