= Charles Hart =

Charles Hart may refer to:

== Diplomats ==
- Charles C. Hart, American ambassador to Albania, 1925–1929, and to Iran, 1930–1933
- Charles Burdett Hart, United States Ambassador to Colombia, 1897–1903

== Sportspeople ==
- Charles J. Hart (1896–1971), American football coach
- Joe Hart (Charles Joseph John Hart, born 1987), English footballer

== Musicians ==
- Charles Hart (lyricist) (born 1961), British lyricist, songwriter, and musician
- Charles Hart (vaudeville), early 20th-century vaudeville musician (see J. Rosamond Johnson)

== Others ==
- Charles Hart (actor) (1625–1683), British actor
- Charles E. Hart (1900–1991), American general
- Charles H. Hart (1866–1934), American leader in The Church of Jesus Christ of Latter-day Saints
- Charles Henry Hart (1847–1918), American author
- Charles H. T. Hart, (fl. 1880s), founding director of South Australian Brewing Company
- Charles Walter Hart (1872–1937), tractor manufacturer

== See also ==
- Charles Frederick Hartt (1840–1878), Canadian-American geologist, paleontologist and naturalist
