= George G. Wortman =

Canadian-American soldier

- Born: August 15, 1841; Moncton, New Brunswick, British North America
- Died: May 5, 1913 (aged 71); Edgewater, Colorado, United States
- Burial place: Crown Hill Cemetery
- Military career
- Allegiance: United States
- Branch: United States Army; Union Army
- Service years: c. 1862–1865; 1866–1869
- Rank: Quartermaster Sergeant
- Unit: 8th U.S. Cavalry
- Conflicts: Indian Wars; American Civil War
- Awards: Medal of Honor

George G. Wortman (August 15, 1841 – May 19, 1913) was a 19th-century American soldier who served in the U.S. Army during the American Civil War and the Indian Wars. During Colonel Thomas L. Crittenden's campaign against the Apache Indians, Wortman served as a sergeant with the 8th U.S. Cavalry and participated in several notable engagements during the conflict. he later received the Medal of Honor for his service in the Arizona Territory during the summer of 1868.

== Biography ==
=== Early life and military service ===
George G. Wortman was born in Moncton, New Brunswick, British North America on August 15, 1841. He worked as a civilian marble cutter prior to the start of the American Civil War when he enlisted in the Union Army in Boston, Massachusetts. After three years of combat service, his regiment disbanded at the end of the war. Wortman served on occupation duty for another year until he was discharged and mustered out of the service. He returned to Canada for a time to visit his family before going back to the United States. He worked in various jobs on the East Coast for around a year before joining the United States Army once more as a volunteer of the newly formed 8th U.S. Cavalry.

The 8th U.S. Cavalry was formed on July 28, 1866, and officially organized at Camp Reynolds in Angel Island, California two months later. Wortman reenlisted with the U.S. Army in Carlisle, Pennsylvania on November 14 and, expressing to the army recruiter his interest in the cavalry, he was assigned to Angel Island to join the regiment. He spent over two months traveling by train, and later stage coach, before finally arriving at Angel Island on January 18, 1867.

Wortman was initially an unassigned recruit but joined Company B at Camp Cady near Barstow, California. On March 12, he accompanied the unit when they traveled from California to their new post at Camp Whipple in the Arizona Territory. Arriving safely at Camp Whipple three weeks later, Wortman was promoted to the rank of Sergeant and assigned to the Quarter Master Corps.

=== Apache campaign ===
In the next two years, especially during the period between April 1867 and March 1868, the 8th US Cavalry were in almost constant combat with the Apache and became one of the US Army's most experienced cavalry regiments. When several bands of Apache began raiding settlements, killing settlers and stealing livestock throughout the territory in the late summer and fall of 1868, Wortman was among the troopers tasked with protecting the entire Arizona Territory. These consisted of no more the 50 or 60 soldiers, mainly taken from Troops B and L of the 8th US Cavalry, who faced repeated ambushes and were often shot at by snipers during their duties. On one of these patrols, Wortman led a 15-man scouting party across the Salinas River. He had made three previous patrols in the area under Lieutenant Colonel Thomas C. Devin, then commanding officer of the 8th US Cavalry, and was familiar with the area. He and his group found a small rancheria nearby, seemingly deserted like many other camps they had come across, where they were attacking in a poorly planned ambush by four Apaches. All four were killed by the troopers. One of them was killed, shot in the chest at point-blank range, by Wortman himself when the Apache charged at him with a knife.

It was during this time that Wortman rode with Lieutenant Rufus Somerby to scout the areas around Lynx Creek and the Agua Fria River. On September 9, 1868, he was part of Somerby's 16-man cavalry squad that successfully ambushed a group of Hualapais renegades killing two men and capturing four women. The following day, they spotted another band on the lower Agua Fria River. Engaging them, four renegades were killed, three women captured and a large amount of enemy supplies and weapons were destroyed. The troopers suffered no casualties in either engagement.

These patrols, as well as the regiment's actions against hostile Apaches, earned many men in the regiment their medals. On July 24, 1869, Wortman was among the many men to receive the Medal of Honor for "bravery in scouts and actions against Indians". It was one of the largest MOH presentations at the time. Wortman died in Edgewater, Colorado on May 19, 1913, and buried at Crown Hill Cemetery.

== Medal of Honor citation ==
Rank and organization: Sergeant, Company B, 8th U.S. Cavalry. Place and date: Arizona, August to October 1868. Entered service at: ------. Birth: Monckton, New Brunswick. Date of issue: 24 July 1869.

Citation:

Bravery in scouts and actions against Indians.

== See also ==
- List of Medal of Honor recipients
