= Goulder =

Goulder is a surname. Notable people with the surname include:

- Alfred Goulder (1907–1986), English cricketer
- Dave Goulder (born 1939), English singer-songwriter and guitarist
- Grace Goulder Izant, nee Grace Goulder (1893–1984), American writer and historian
- Michael Goulder (1927–2010), English biblical scholar
