= Rufina (disambiguation) =

Rufina is a commune in Tuscany.

Rufina may also refer to:

- Rufina (name), a female first name and surname
- Rufina, Guayanilla, Puerto Rico, a barrio in Puerto Rico
- Rufina Patis, Philippine brand of fish sauce made by fermenting salted fish for several months
- Efferia rufina, species of insect

== See also ==
- Rufus (disambiguation)
