= Ravel (disambiguation) =

Maurice Ravel was a Basque French composer and pianist of Impressionist music.

The word ravel has to do with thread and yarn.

Ravel may also refer to:

== People with the name ==
- Ann M. Ravel, American lawyer and member of the Federal Election Commission
- Bruno Ravel (born 1964), American heavy metal guitarist
- Edeet Ravel (born 1955), Israeli-Canadian novelist
- Freddie Ravel, American keyboardist, recording artist and international keynote speaker
- Gaston Ravel (1878–1958), French film director and screenwriter
- Ginette Ravel (1940–2022), Canadian singer and lyricist
- Jules-Jean Ravel (1901–1986), French communist politician and trade union organizer
- Pierre Joseph Ravel (1832–1908), Swiss civil engineer, father of the composer
- Ravel Morrison (born 1993), English footballer

== Other uses ==
- Ravel, Puy-de-Dôme, France, a commune
  - Château de Ravel, a castle situated in the commune
- 4727 Ravel, a main-belt asteroid
- Ravel Peak, Alexander Island, Antarctica
- RAVeL network, an initiative to build a network of pedestrian paths in Wallonia, Belgium
- The monadic function reshape into a vector in the mathematical notation and computer language APL

== See also ==
- Raval (disambiguation)
- Ravels, Antwerp
- Tallinn, also known as Reval
