= C. rufus =

C. rufus may refer to:

- Canis rufus, the red wolf, a mammal species
- Cursorius rufus, the Burchell's courser, a bird species

== See also ==
- Rufus (disambiguation)
- Calvisius Rufus, a governor of Britannia Inferior, a province of Roman Britain
