= Ben Field =

Ben Field is the name of:

- Ben Field (actor) (1876–1939), British actor
- Ben Field (murderer) (born 1991), British murderer
- Ben Field (writer) (1900–1986), American author
- Benjamin Hazard Field (1814–1893), American merchant

== See also ==
- Benn Fields, American high jumper
