= Tito Mattei =

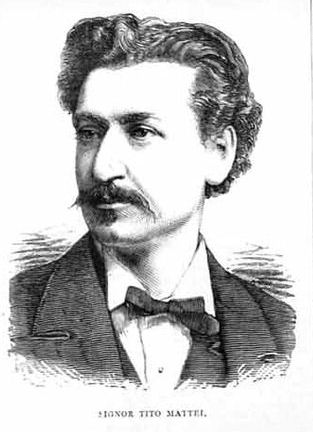
- Mattei in 1879

Background information
- Born: Tito Eduardo Achille Mattei; 24 May 1839; Campobasso, Italy
- Died: 30 March 1914 (aged 74) London, England
- Genres: Classical
- Occupations: Pianist, composer, conductor
- Instrument: Piano

Tito Eduardo Achille Mattei (24 May 1839 – 30 March 1914) was an Italian pianist, composer, and conductor.

== Biography ==
Born at Campobasso in Italy, he was educated in Naples where he studied with Sigismond Thalberg, Carlo Conti, and Michele Ruta. A musical prodigy, he gave his first concert in 1846 aged 5 afterwards touring Italy, France and Germany. At just 11 years-old in 1852 he was appointed Professor at the Accademia Nazionale di Santa Cecilia in Rome. He gave his first performance in London in 1853 aged 12 and also in 1853 played before Pope Pius IX who gave him a gold medal; he was appointed pianist to Victor Emmanuel II, the King of Italy. In 1863 he moved to London where he became the conductor at Her Majesty's Theatre. Mattei was a Chevalier of the Order of Saints Maurice and Lazarus and belonged to various important musical societies including the Societa Filarmonica of Florence. In 1870 he organised and conducted a season of Italian Opera in London. In 1871 he married Amalia Colombo (born 1845) at Kensington in London. Their daughter Marie Jeanette Mattei was born in London in 1875.

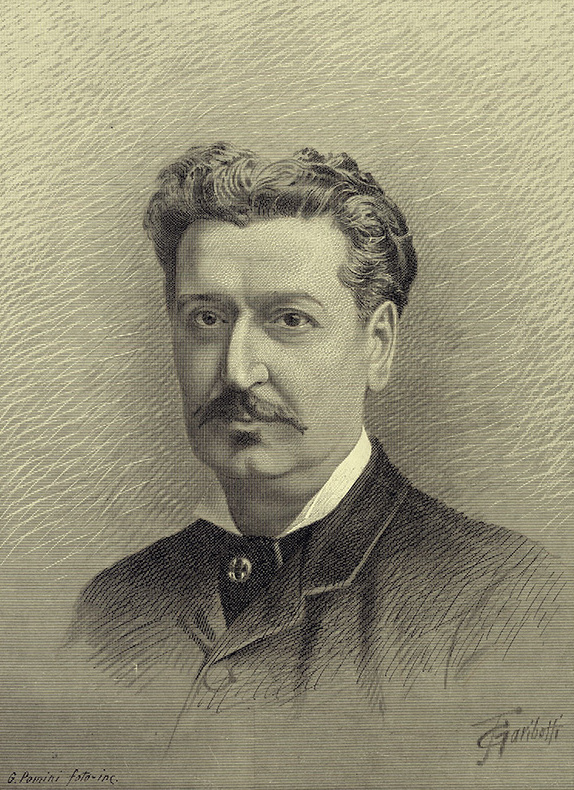
Portrait of Tito Mattei by F. Garibotti

He wrote several hundred piano-pieces and songs which had a moderate success including the ballet The Spider and the Fly, 'For the Sake of the Past', 'Dear Heart', 'Non torno', 'Non è ver', and 'Oh! Oh! Hear the Wild Wind Blow'. His operas included Maria di Grand and the comic opera La Prima Donna. He contributed ballet music and the song "O Leave Me Not, Dear Heart" to the burlesque melodrama Monte Cristo Jr. (1886) which played at the Gaiety Theatre in London and had a cast including Nellie Farren, Letty Lind and Marion Hood. A Freemason, in 1888 he joined the Rothesay Lodge No 1687 in London.

Mattei enjoyed driving fast cars — in 1909 the 68 year-old Mattei broke the speed limit while the American lawyer Rufus Applegarth was a passenger. Applegarth defended Mattei at the Police Court and despite the prosecution's objections that Applegarth could not defend his client in an English court, the American lawyer with 40 years experience successfully got his client off the charge.

Several of his works have been played during the BBC Proms including 'Non è ver' and 'Bianca'.

Although he was a successful musician the last period of his life was not affluent. He was declared bankrupt in 1883, 1890 and 1900 due to repeated Stock Exchange speculations that resulted in the forced sale of the copyright of his compositions; In 1901 he was living alone as a lodger at an address in Paddington in London and had apparently separated from his wife and child who were then living at a separate address Tito Mattei died in London in 1914 at the age of 74.
