= Christian D. Fjeldsted =

Danish Mormon leader

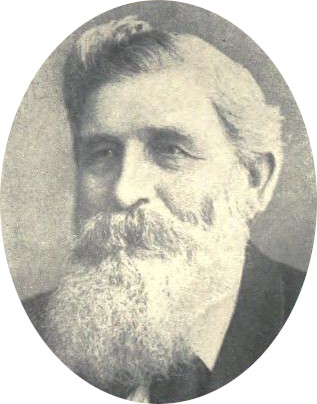

First Seven Presidents of the Seventy
- 6 April 1884 – 23 December 1905
- Called by: John Taylor

Personal details
- Born: Christian Daniel Fjeldsted; 20 February 1829; Sundbyvester, Copenhagen, Denmark
- Died: 23 December 1905 (aged 76); Salt Lake City, Utah, United States
- Resting place: Logan City Cemetery; 41.7492°N 111.8061°W
- Spouse(s): Karen Olsen; Johanne Maria Christensen; Catrina Marie Christensen; Josephine Margarethe Larsen
- Children: 15
- Parents: Henrik or Henry Fjeldsted; Ane Katherine Henriksen

Christian Daniel Fjeldsted (20 February 1829 – 23 December 1905; sometimes spelled Fjelsted) was a general authority of the Church of Jesus Christ of Latter-day Saints (LDS Church) from 1884 to his death. Fjelsted was one of the first Scandinavian converts to Mormonism and was a prominent Mormon missionary to his home country of Denmark and the other Scandinavian countries.

Fjeldsted was born in Sundbyvester in Copenhagen, Denmark. In 1851, he and his wife were taught about Mormonism from LDS Church missionary and apostle Erastus Snow. They became members of the LDS Church in 1852. The following year, he was ordained an elder in the church by Peter O. Hansen and he came to preside over districts of the church in Amager and Ålborg, Denmark and Christiania (now Oslo), Norway.

In 1858, Fjeldsted and his family emigrated to Utah Territory to join the gathering of Latter Day Saints in Salt Lake City. From 1867 to 1870, Fjeldsted served a church mission to Denmark and Norway. In 1884, he became a member of the church's First Seven Presidents of the Seventy. As a general authority of the church, Fjeldsted served two more missions to Scandinavia, including two terms as the president of the Scandinavian Mission of the church from 1888 to 1890 and from 1904 to 1905. Fjeldsted also served missions in northern Utah and in Chicago, Illinois among Scandinavian emigrants.

Shortly after returning to Utah from Scandinavia, Fjeldsted died in Salt Lake City. He was a practitioner of plural marriage and had four wives and fifteen children.

The Church of Jesus Christ of Latter-day Saints titles
| Preceded by John Van Cott | Member of the First Seven Presidents of the Seventy; April, 1884 – December 23, 1905 | Succeeded by Charles H. Hart |
