= Rufus (disambiguation) =

Rufus is a masculine given name and a surname.

Rufus may also refer to:

== Places ==
- Rufus, Oregon, a city in Sherman County
- Rufus Castle, 15th-century castle in Portland, England
- Rufus River, a river of New South Wales, Australia

== Arts and entertainment ==
=== Music ===
- Rufus (band), a 1970s/1980s funk band fronted by Chaka Khan
- Rüfüs Du Sol, a contemporary indie dance group from Sydney, Australia (formerly known as RÜFÜS)
- Rufus (Rufus album), 1973
- Rufus (jazz album), a 1963 album featuring Archie Shepp, John Tchicai, Don Moore and J. C. Moses

=== Film and television ===
- Rufus (film), a 2012 Canadian film directed by Dave Schultz
- Rufus, a 2016 American television film; see List of Nickelodeon original films
- "Rufus" (Doctors), a 2003 television episode

== Other ==
- Rufus (software), a free, open-source application for Microsoft Windows, to create bootable USB drives
- 33158 Rúfus, a main-belt minor planet; see List of minor planets: 33001-34000
- Rufus, the original name of the Demon core, a subcritical mass of plutonium used in the Manhattan Project
- Project Rufus, an American study to identify nuclear weapons testing locations

== See also ==
- Rufous, a shade of red
- Rufous-fronted (disambiguation)
- Rufina (disambiguation)
