= Ara Bekaryan =

Armenian painter and pedagogue

- Born: 30 May 1913; Afyonkarahisar, Turkey
- Died: 18 June 1986 (aged 73); Yerevan, USSR

Ara Vaghinag Bekaryan (May 30, 1913 – June 18, 1986) was an Armenian painter, graphic, pedagogue, and USSR portrait artist. He was born in Afyonkarahisar, Turkey to a family of educators.

== Biography ==
- In 1932, Bekaryan graduated from Yerevan's Geghard College with Vahram Gayfejyan and Sedrak Arakelyan
- In 1939, Bekaryan graduated from the Russian Academy of Arts in Saint Petersburg
- From 1939 to 1945 he joined the Russo-Finnish wars and World War II
- From 1945 to 1986 he lectured at Yerevan State Academy of Fine Arts and the Yerevan State Institute of Theatre and Cinematography
- In 1964, a professor
- Exhibition in 1930
- Individual exhibitions in 1947 (Yerevan), 1964 (Yerevan), 1964 (Moscow)
- Armenian Soviet Socialist Republic distinguished artist in 1945
- Armenian Soviet Socialist Republic portrait artist in 1965

== Work ==
- Close to the Swing
- Florists
- Ashtarak
- Oshakan
- Rest
- Vahan Terian's portrait
- "Nazar the Brave" book design
- "Nairi's World" book design
- Hagop Baronian's work designs

== In memory ==
The Central Bank of Armenia has released a silver coin in tribute to Ara Bekaryan's 100th birthday. The face of the coin has a picture representing an episode of "Ashtarak" canvas, the reverse portrait depicts Ara Bekaryan and "Nazar the Brave" fairy tale illustration.

== Literature ==
- Маня Казарян "Ара Бекарян" Советский художник 1976 г. Москва (Rus.)
- Daniel Dznuni's "Armenian Visual Artists" - 1977, Yerevan
- Manya Ghazaryan's "Ara Bekaryan" - 1984, Yerevan
