= Bothwell Ranch =

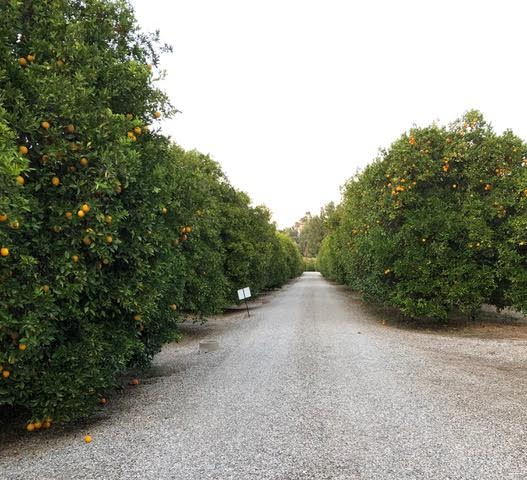
- Bothwell Ranch in 2019.
- Location: 5300 Oakdale Ave., Woodland Hills, CA, USA
- Founded: 1926

Bothwell Ranch is the oldest-remaining orange grove in the San Fernando Valley.

== History ==
Citrus rancher, former Indianapolis 500 racer, pioneer surfer, and collector of vintage cars Lindley Bothwell founded Bothwell Ranch in 1926, purchasing land in Tarzana to sell oranges. Having graduated from Oregon State University with a degree in agriculture, Lindley was qualified to farm the 100 acres he bought, expanding the ranch over time to 14,000 acres. The ranch survived while others folded due to rising land value during the housing boom after World War II.

Bothwell died in 1986, and his family began selling off pieces of the ranch little by little, still maintaining the farm until his wife, Ann, died in 2016. Whittled down to 14 acres, the ranch was put up for sale in 2019. Neighbors attempted to raise money via crowdfunding to save the property, but to no avail; in 2022 it was determined that the ranch would be turned into a housing tract called the Oakdale Estates, with 21 two-story homes replacing the grove of 1,137 orange trees. L.A. City Councilman Bob Blumenfield was able to secure the preservation of a few acres and a few hundred trees to be managed by the Mountain Recreations and Conservation Authority.
