= John Van Cott =

American Mormon missionary (1814–1883)

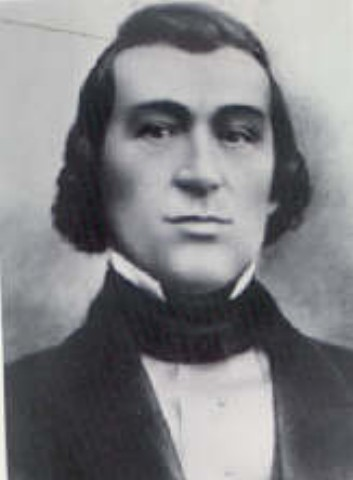
- John Van Cott in 1846

First Seven Presidents of the Seventy
- October 8, 1862 – February 18, 1883
- Called by: Brigham Young

Personal details
- Born: September 7, 1814; Canaan, New York, United States
- Died: February 18, 1883 (aged 68); Salt Lake City, Utah Territory, United States
- Resting place: Salt Lake City Cemetery; 40.777°N 111.858°W
- Spouse(s): Lucy Lavinia Sackett; Jemima Morris; Laura Petra Lund; Caroline Pratt; Caroline Caisa
- Children: 25 to 28
- Parents: Losee Van Cott; Lovinia Jemima Pratt

John Van Cott (September 7, 1814 – February 18, 1883) was a prominent member of the Church of Jesus Christ of Latter-day Saints serving as a member of the Quorum of the Seventy, as one of the Seven Presidents of the Seventy, and also as president of the Scandinavian Mission.

== Early life and conversion ==
John Van Cott was descended from a Dutch settler named Claes Cornelissen Van Cott who came from Holland to what is now New York [Nieuw Amsterdam] in 1662.

His father died of consumption when John was 10 years old. He first heard of the Book of Mormon and the Church of Jesus Christ of Latter Day Saints from his cousin LDS Apostle Parley P. Pratt who was seven years his senior. (John's mother, Lovina Pratt and Parley's father, Jared, were siblings.)

Some accounts put this first introduction as early as 1833 but, unlike his cousin, he did not join for some time. In 1835 he married Lucy Sackett and they had four children in Canaan, New York.

In 1843, Lucy joined the Latter Day Saint church. Historical material is somewhat sketchy here as most sources say that Van Cott himself was baptized by Pratt in Nauvoo in 1844 or 45, but others imply that the family moved to Nauvoo after he was baptized. Records are consistent in saying that the family was in Nauvoo in 1846 and stayed for a time at Pratt's home and that Van Cott donated about $400 towards the completion of the Nauvoo Temple.

== Pioneer and church servant ==
The winter of 1846 was spent at Winter Quarters, where Van Cott became well acquainted with Brigham Young. According to historical records, he was chosen to be a bishop at this time to watch after the families of men who had joined the Mormon Battalion. He was ordained a Seventy on February 25, 1847.

As a Mormon pioneer, John made the "trip across the plains" multiple times. In 1847 he, his wife, two children (their two other children died in New York), and 59-year-old mother traveled with the Daniel Spencer/Perrigrine Sessions Company, wherein John was appointed to be a "captain of 10" and a marshal. They arrived in the Salt Lake Valley on September 25.

After arriving in the valley, at the behest of Young, Van Cott went back out on the trail to assist other companies who were having difficulties. He assisted in the exploration of the new land. He was chosen to be the first marshal of Salt Lake City.

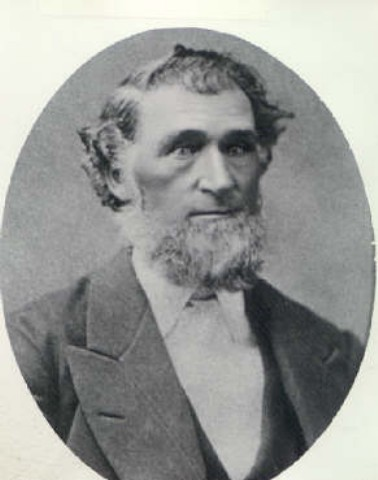
John Van Cott in his older years

In 1852 Van Cott began a four-year assignment as the president of the Scandinavia Mission, headquartered in Denmark. He was called to the same assignment again in 1859 and served for two-and-a-half years. He became proficient in Danish as a result of his work there, and translated the serial article "Celestial Marriage" by Orson Pratt (originally found in The Seer), as well as Pratt's 1852 discourse on Celestial Marriage and a pamphlet on the New Jerusalem into Danish. His translations were published in 1855 as "Det celestiale ægteskab eller den af Gud aabenbarede ægteskabsorden for tid og al evighed, og det Nye Jerusalem."

On the journey home to Utah, Van Cott led a group of church members from Scandinavia to the United States aboard the ship Waldemar, and then on the journey across the midwest to Salt Lake. He is listed as being the President of the Madsen and Liljenquist companies, leading a group of Scandinavian Saints to Salt Lake in July–Sept 1862. This may be the same group he led on the Waldemar, but further information is needed.

In 1862 Van Cott was sustained as one of the Seven Presidents of the Seventy. The following year, he was elected to the first of four terms in the House of Representatives of the Utah territorial legislature. He died at his home a short distance south of Salt Lake City, February 18, 1883, after a lingering illness of several months.

== Family ==
Like several church leaders of his time, John Van Cott was instructed to practice plural marriage. He had five wives and 28 children. His first child was born in 1838, his last in 1878. Some did not live to see adulthood, while others did; some became prominent members of their communities. He has thousands of descendants.

His wives and children:

=== Lucy Lavina Sackett ===
July 17, 1815, Stephentown, Columbia, New York – January 31, 1902, Salt Lake City, Utah; married September 15, 1835

- Martha Van Cott (February 29, 1838 [sic], Canaan, Columbia, New York – March 25, 1908, Salt Lake City), married William Price
- Lucy Van Cott (December 16, 1839, Canaan, Columbia, New York – September 9, 1843, Canaan, Columbia, New York), buried near her brother, John Losee Van Cott, and their grandfather, Losee Van Cott
- John Losee Van Cott (January 16, 1842, Canaan, Columbia, New York – November 6, 1843, Canaan, Columbia, New York), buried there near the Van Cott family farm
- Mary Van Cott (February 2, 1844, Elmira, New York – January 15, 1884, Salt Lake City), married James Cobb, Brigham Young
- Losee Van Cott (August 23, 1847, Independence Rock, Natrona, Wyoming – March 18, 1851, Salt Lake City)
- Fannie Van Cott (April 18, 1850, Salt Lake City – December 21, 1930, Colonia Dublan, Chihuahua Mexico), married Alexander Findlay MacDonald
- Byron Van Cott (March 2, 1852, Salt Lake City – November 19, 1853, Salt Lake City)

=== Jemima Morris ===
August 4, 1831, North Coleford, Gloucestershire, England – March 23, 1851, Salt Lake City; married May 2, 1849

- Morris Van Cott (March 14, 1851, Salt Lake City – March 16, 1851, Salt Lake City)

=== Caroline Amelia Pratt ===
January 20, 1840, Detroit, Wayne, Michigan – October 10, 1915, Salt Lake City; married February 12, 1857

- Orson Van Cott (April 21, 1859, Salt Lake City – May 8, 1859, Salt Lake City)
- Anson Van Cott (April 21, 1859, Salt Lake City – April 21, 1859, Salt Lake City)
- Viola Van Cott (June 19, 1860, Salt Lake City – May 17, 1931, Salt Lake City), married Niels Joseph Madsen
- Oscar Van Cott (September 17, 1863, Salt Lake City – June 9, 1955, Salt Lake City), married Ida Quayle
- Marlon Van Cott (October 10, 1867, Salt Lake City – July 29, 1941, Salt Lake City), married Sarah Ellen Gabbott, Sarah Jane Ottenger Rust
- Ray Van Cott (October 27, 1869, Salt Lake City – March 18, 1944), married Ida Moyle
- Harold Van Cott (July 8, 1873, Salt Lake City – May 15, 1934), married Ella McAllister Sheets
- Edith Van Cott (March 25, 1875, Salt Lake City – February 22, 1941, Los Angeles, California), married Ezra Thompson Palmer
- Lavinia Van Cott (January 15, 1877, Salt Lake City – October 27, 1964, Salt Lake City), married Joseph Alfred White

=== Laura Christina Petra Lund ===
February 27, 1843, Holmen, Copenhagen, Denmark – December 1, 1913, Salt Lake City; married February 12, 1857

- Agnes Van Cott (May 9, 1858, Salt Lake City – January 6, 1859, Salt Lake City)
- Waldemar Van Cott (December 11, 1859, Salt Lake City – January 15, 1940, Salt Lake City), married Ella Catherine Quayle
- Frank Victor Van Cott (August 7, 1863, Salt Lake City – August 17, 1938, Salt Lake City), married Annie Mary Anderson
- Lucy May Van Cott (May 5, 1869, Salt Lake City – September 28, 1958)
- Roy Van Cott (January 12, 1872, Salt Lake City – 1876)
- Ernest Van Cott (December 18, 1875, Salt Lake City – August 27, 1924), married May Siddoway

=== Caroline Lena Caisa Erickson ===
June 27, 1833, Brevik, Skaraborg, Sweden – November 14, 1901, Salt Lake City; married November 22, 1862

- Selma Van Cott (November 12, 1863, Salt Lake City – December 5, 1935, Salt Lake City), married William Whitaker Taylor (son of John Taylor), Lehi Pratt
- Nephi Van Cott (February 25, 1865, Salt Lake City – September 18, 1865, Salt Lake City)
- Albert Van Cott (December 25, 1868, Salt Lake City – November 10, 1959, Salt Lake City), married Margaret Burns South
- Olive (or Olivia) Van Cott (April 27, 1875, Ephraim, Sanpete, Utah – August 27, 1935, Salt Lake City), married Thomas Stafford Davis
- Enoch Van Cott (January 7, 1878, Salt Lake City – August 12, 1952), married Clara Harriet Bailey

== Gallery ==
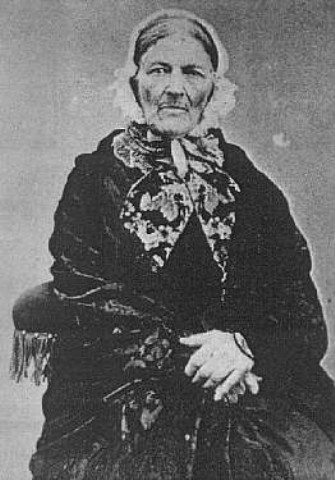
Lavina Jemima Pratt Van Cott, John Van Cott's mother, 1787–1878

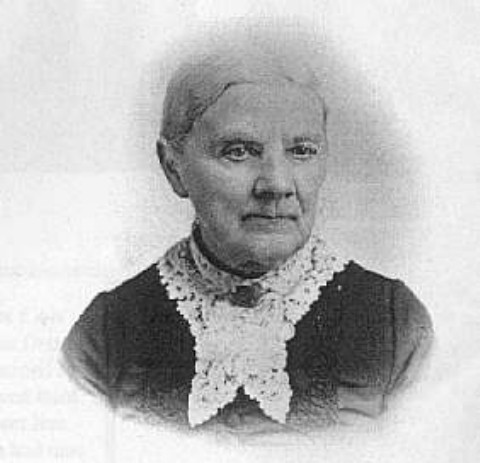
Lucy Sackett, Wife of John Van Cott, 1815–1902

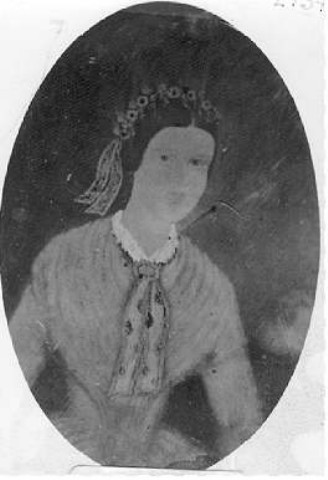
Jemima Morris, Wife of John Van Cott, 1831–1851

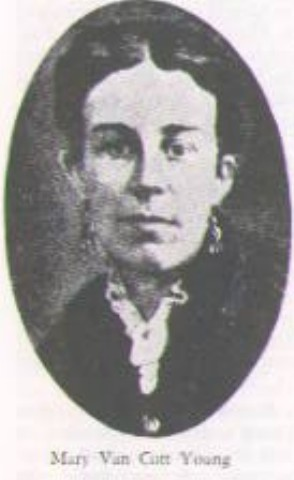
Mary Van Cott, daughter of John and Lucy Van Cott, 1844–1884

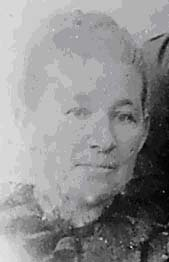
Fannie Van Cott, daughter of John and Lucy Van Cott, 1850–1930

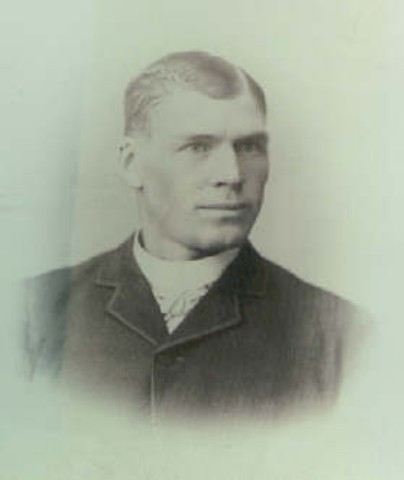
Frank Van Cott, son of John and Laura Van Cott, August 7, 1863 – August 17, 1938

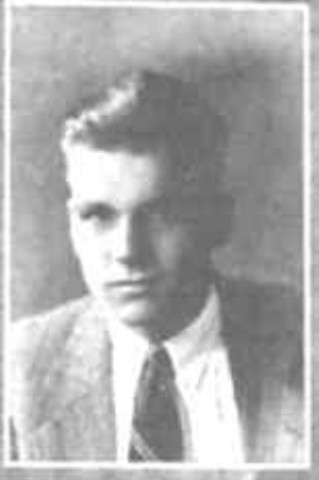
Ernest Van Cott, son of John and Laura Van Cott, December 18, 1875 – August 27, 1924. Prominent Salt Lake City doctor.

The Church of Jesus Christ of Latter-day Saints titles
Preceded by Zera Pulsipher	Member of the First Seven Presidents of the Seventy; October, 1862 - February 18, 1883	Succeeded by Christian D. Fjelsted
