= Joseph Fischer (footballer) =

Luxembourgish footballer

Personal information
- Date of birth: 24 February 1909
- Place of birth: Itzig, Luxembourg
- Date of death: 6 June 1986 (aged 77)
- Place of death: Esch-sur-Alzette, Luxembourg

International career
Years	Team	Apps	(Gls)
1924–1940	Luxembourg	49	(0)

Joseph Fischer (24 February 1909 – 6 June 1986) was a Luxembourgish footballer. Fischer made his debut for Luxembourg, aged 15 years 7 months and 11 days. He later competed in the men's tournament at the 1936 Summer Olympics.
