= Annes Varjun =

Estonian artist

Annes Varjun (18 August 1907 – 6 June 1986) was an Estonian artist who worked in ceramics. His works are on display in the Estonian Museum of Applied Art and Design and in the Tallinn Art Hall.
