= George Pearce (English cricketer) =

English cricketer

George Smart Pearce (27 October 1908 – 16 June 1986) was an English cricketer active from 1928 to 1936 who played for Sussex. He was born died in Horsham. He appeared in 54 first-class matches as a righthanded batsman who bowled right arm medium pace. He scored 1,295 runs with a highest score of 80 and took 89 wickets with a best performance of five for 34.
