= Jan Kavan (sculptor) =

Czech sculptor

- Born: 26 May 1905; Prague, Austria-Hungary
- Died: 7 June 1986 (aged 81); Prague, Czechoslovakia
- Occupation: Sculptor

Jan Kavan (26 May 1905 – 7 June 1986) was a Czech sculptor. His work was part of the sculpture event in the art competition at the 1932 Summer Olympics.
