= Frans Van Dessel =

Belgian footballer

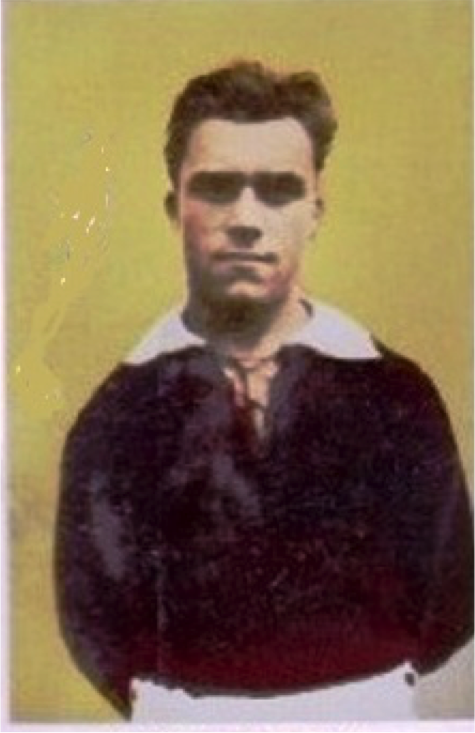
- Frans Van Dessel in 1930

Personal information
- Date of birth: 9 May 1911
- Date of death: 3 June 1986 (aged 75)

International career
| Years | Team | Apps | (Gls) |
| 1934 | Belgium | 1 | (0) |

Frans Van Dessel (9 May 1911 – 3 June 1986) was a Belgian footballer. He played in one match for the Belgium national football team in 1934.
