= Tom Klose =

Australian cricketer (1918–1986)

Personal information
- Full name: Tom Elliott Klose
- Born: 22 January 1918; Adelaide, South Australia
- Died: 13 June 1986 (aged 68); Nailsworth, Adelaide, South Australia
- Batting: Right-handed
- Bowling: Slow left-arm orthodox, left-arm medium-pace
- Role: All-rounder

Domestic team information
- Years: Team
- 1939–40 to 1949–50: South Australia

Career statistics
Competition	First-class
Matches	25
Runs scored	895
Batting average	22.94
100s/50s	0/5
Top score	80
Balls bowled	3236
Wickets	32
Bowling average	37.53
5 wickets in innings	0
10 wickets in match	0
Best bowling	4/23
Catches/stumpings	16/–
- Source: Cricinfo, 12 December 2019

Tom Elliott Klose (22 January 1918 – 13 June 1986) was an Australian cricketer who played first-class cricket for South Australia between 1939 and 1950.

A middle-order batsman, left-arm orthodox spin or medium-pace bowler and brilliant fieldsman, Tom Klose was considered one of Australia's most promising young cricketers immediately before World War II. In his debut first-class season of 1939–40 he made 305 runs at an average of 23.46, took 18 wickets at 16.88, and took 10 catches.

Klose served in the Army from 1940 to 1945. He played a few seasons after the war without fulfilling his youthful promise. He retained his fielding skill, however: playing for Prospect in the 1948–49 Adelaide season, he won the competition fielding prize with 62 points, well ahead of the second-placed player, Neil Dansie, on 39.
