= Lindley Bothwell =

- Born: August 1, 1901; Los Angeles, California, U.S.
- Died: June 19, 1986 (aged 84); Sherman Oaks, Los Angeles, California, U.S.
- Other name: Mr. B
- Education: University of Southern California and Oregon State University
- Occupations: Citrus orchard dynasty in Southern California, and consulting agriculturalist
- Known for: Coach of the USC Yell Leaders and Song Girls, OSU Yell King, Founder of the Trojan Knights, + preeminent antique car collector/racer

Lindley Bothwell (August 1, 1901 – June 19, 1986) was a prosperous Southern California orange grower, a consulting citrus agriculturalist from his Lindley Bothwell Ranch in the San Fernando Valley, and an antique automobile collector and racer.

Bothwell is well known for being a founding member of the Trojan Knights, as well as a Yell Leader at the University of Southern California (USC) and for his invention of moving card stunts in stadium bleachers. He was the founder and volunteer coach of the USC Yell Leaders and Song Girls for 60 years.

== Student years ==
=== At University of Southern California ===
Born in Los Angeles, Bothwell entered the University of Southern California (USC) in the year 1919. His choice of school made sense: his grandfather, Dr. Walter Lindley, was the first dean of the USC School of Medicine, and his aunts founded USC's chapter of Kappa Alpha Theta There he completed both his undergraduate and master's degrees while founding many organizations and groups that are still present at the university today. In addition to his studies and involvement with organizations on campus, Bothwell was a varsity member of the baseball team, and was good enough to be offered a $10,000 signing bonus to play for the Pittsburgh Pirates, an offer he turned down so that he could continue his education.

==== The Yell Leaders ====
In his freshman year at USC (1919), Bothwell and some of his friends decided that the fans at USC Trojans football games were not loud enough or energetic enough, and that having an energetic crowd could be a large factor in the success of the team. In pursuit of this goal, Bothwell formed the USC Yell Leading Squad (better known as the Yell Leaders), with Bothwell dubbed the "Yell King". The Yell Leaders were a group of male students who led the university's student section in cheers at football games. All of the cheers were original, and had an immediate effect on the fans and the team.

One of the more impressive and creative cheers created by Bothwell and organized by the Yell Leaders was the "Floating 'T'". Whenever it was called out, students would release balloons that had been assigned to their seats at the same time, giving the effect of a giant golden 'T' rising from the stands, shortly followed by a mass of cardinal balloons with an 'T' shape in the middle. The "Floating 'T'" drew such a large response from the crowd that Lindley organized an even bigger stunt with a group of spirited students.

On October 21, 1922, during the Trojans' game against the University of Nevada, the Yell Leaders commenced in performing the first ever moving card stunt consisting of 500 men sitting on the 50-yard line. The cards spelled out "Trojans" in sequence and was immediately successful; over the next few years, many other universities began performing similar card stunts.

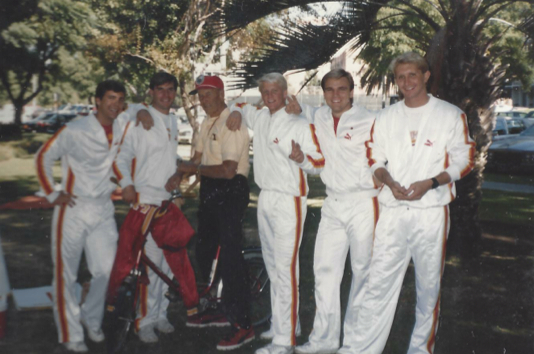
Lindley Bothwell with the USC Yell Leaders in 1986 on the USC campus

==== Trojan Knights ====
In addition to the USC Yell Leaders, Bothwell – along with fellow students Harry Pryor and Harry Kennedy – decided to found an organization that would be dedicated to upholding the traditions of the university. In 1921, the three students formed the Trojan Knights, a spirit and service fraternity specific to the University of Southern California. A non-Greek fraternity, the Trojan Knights are still referred to as both the university's official hosts and its "guardians of tradition". The Knights have been responsible and/or influential in many of the university's traditions, including the Victory Bell, the adoption of George Tirebiter, USC's first (unofficial) mascot, and the origin story of the current mascot, Traveler.

=== At Oregon State University ===
In 1924, after Bothwell had graduated from USC with two degrees, he decided to attend Oregon State University), known then as Oregon Agricultural College, to study agriculture. There he continued his fondness for leading in spirit by becoming OAC's yell king as well. He continued with his trademark moving card stunts, improving from the simple spelling of words to animated pictures, the most famous being the OAC Beaver squashing rival Oregon University's yellow 'O'.

The spirit with which he led the student section of OAC reached many people, including Notre Dame's head football coach Knute Rockne. Rockne was so impressed with Bothwell that he asked him to be an honorary cheerleader for the Fighting Irish in their upcoming 1925 Rose Bowl game with Stanford, a request that Bothwell was more than happy to agree to.

== Adulthood ==
=== Agriculturalist ===
After graduating from OAC in 1926 with a degree in agriculture, Bothwell purchased a Valencia orange orchard in Woodland Hills, a community in the western San Fernando Valley of Los Angeles. He was very successful, expanding his citrus empire to 34 ranches in Southern California that he owned or managed. The USDA considered him one of the country's ten largest citrus farmers by 1943. The Lindley Bothwell Ranch, reduced in size, is the last commercial citrus orchard in the San Fernando Valley.

Bothwell had his own soil chemistry laboratory, and was a consultant to growers throughout the Southwest U.S. He also became one of the leading cattle breeders in California. He was a member of American Society of Agronomy, and the Society of Soil Scientists.

=== Personal life ===
In 1927, Bothwell married Marion Seale, a fellow Oregon State student. The couple had two children: son Lindley Jr. and daughter Bonnie.

Bothwell, apart from being a very successful citrus farmer, had many other hobbies and commitments. In 1926 he helped found the USC chapter of the Sigma Alpha Epsilon fraternity. He was also the coach of the USC Yell Leaders (and later the USC Song Girls, founded in 1967) for 60 years.

Automobile collector

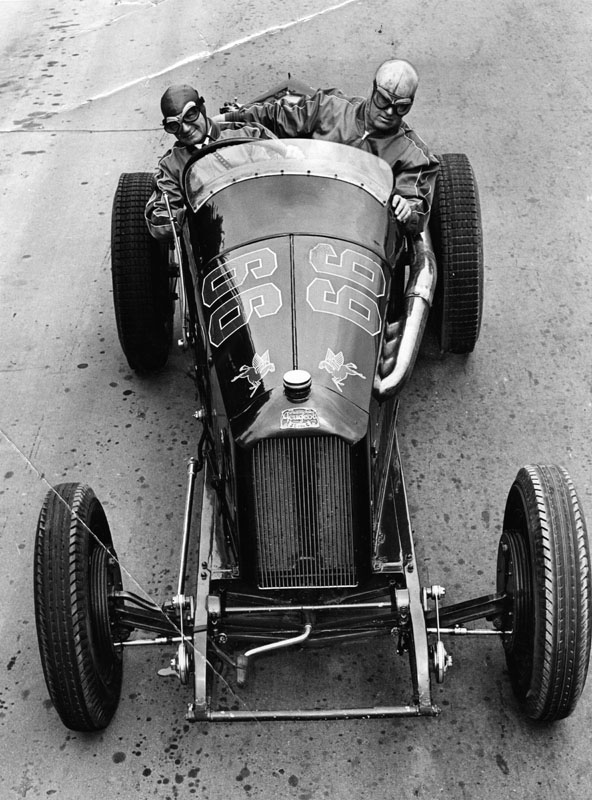
Bothwell (right) with Ralph DePalma

Bothwell was avid antique car collector. By 1954, he was the owner of the largest private antique automobiles collection in the country. His collection included the 1911 Rolls-Royce which had belonged to Nicholas II, the last tsar of Russia. Bothwell served as the Los Angeles regional executive of the Sports Car Club of America.

Bothwell drove and raced some of them, and so created vintage racing in the United States in the 1940s and 1950s. He used a 1913 Peugeot to break one of the speed records at the Indianapolis Motor Speedway in 1949. Even though this was a new track record for the car's class, Bothwell failed to qualify for the Indianapolis 500 due to the Peugeot's age.

Bothwell also collected horse-drawn streetcars, with the only private collection in the world at the time. He built a rail line and a tram barn on his ranch, to keep them in working order and to entertain guests.

Bothwell had an affinity for the water. He was a pioneer surfer in California, and a rower who maintained a small fleet of crew shells for training in San Pedro Bay and off of Catalina Island.

After battling a long illness, Bothwell died at the age of 84 on June 19, 1986, in Sherman Oaks.

Bothwell's second wife, Ann, continued management of the 1,987 trees remaining in their Woodland Hills orchard. She also kept his antique automobile collection intact, and running/run regularly on the ranch property. The collection was sold in November 2017.
