= Donald Tye =

American baseball player

- Pitcher
- Born: March 7, 1913; Lockland, Ohio, U.S.
- Died: June 15, 1986 (aged 73); Cincinnati, Ohio, U.S.
- Threw: Left

Negro league baseball debut
- 1936, for the Cincinnati Tigers

Last appearance
- 1936, for the Cincinnati Tigers

Teams
- Cincinnati Tigers (1936)

Donald Tye (March 7, 1913 – June 15, 1986), nicknamed "Tippy", was an American Negro league pitcher in the 1930s.

A native of Lockland, Ohio, Tye played for the Cincinnati Tigers in 1936. He died in Cincinnati, Ohio in 1986 at age 73.
