= Rufous-fronted =

The descriptive term rufous-fronted is part of the common name of a number of different bird species:

- Rufous-fronted antthrush (Formicarius rufifrons), a species of bird in the family Formicariidae
- Rufous-fronted babbler (Stachyridopsis rufifrons), a species of bird in the Old World babbler family
- Rufous-fronted laughingthrush (Garrulax rufifrons), a species of bird in the family Timaliidae
- Rufous-fronted parakeet (Bolborhynchus ferrugineifrons), a species of parrot in the family Psittacidae
- Rufous-fronted prinia (Prinia buchanani), a species of bird in the family Cisticolidae
- Rufous-fronted tailorbird (Orthotomus frontalis), a species of Old World warbler in the family Sylviidae
- Rufous-fronted thornbird (Phacellodomus rufifrons), a species of bird in the family Furnariidae
- Rufous-fronted tit (Aegithalos iouschistos), a small passerine bird of the eastern and central Himalayas belonging to the long-tailed tit family, Aegithalidae
- Rufous-fronted wood quail (Odontophorus erythrops), a species of bird in the family Odontophoridae
