= Lidiya Khaindrova =

Russian poet and author (1910–1986)

- Лидия Хаиндрова
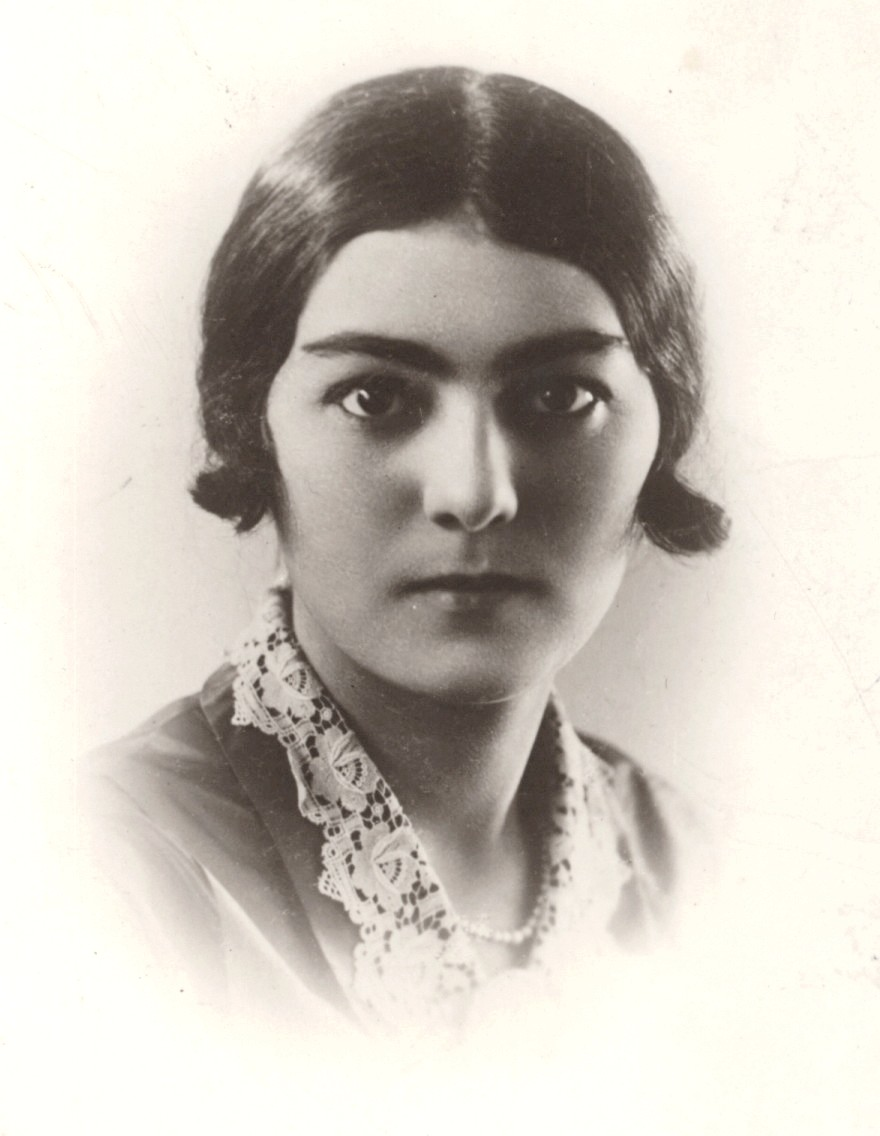
- Khaindrova in the 1930s
- Born: Lidiya Yulianovna Khaindrava; 14 June 1910; Odessa, Russian Empire
- Died: 19 June 1986 (aged 76); Krasnodar, Russian SFSR, Soviet Union
- Occupation: Poet

Lidiya Yulianovna Serebrova (née Khaindrova; Russian: Лидия Юлиановна Хаиндрова; 14 June 1910 – 19 June 1986) was a Russian poet and author. Khaindrova's family left Russia in the years immediately preceding the Russian Revolution and she lived in China from 1916 to 1947. In China, Khaindrova was involved in literary circles and published poems in magazines, journals and her own collections. Central themes in her work are the longing for home, the revolution, peace and war. In 1947 she moved to Russia, and she later worked as a proofreader and English teacher.

Khaindrova published five collections of her poems: Steps (1939), Wings (1941), Crossroads (1943), Heart (1947) and Dates, Dates (1976). She also contributed to the anthology Convolutions (1935) alongside other Russian poets in China.

== Biography ==
=== Early life ===
Lidiya Yulianovna Khaindrova was born in Odessa on 14 June 1910. Her father was Yulian Levanovich Khaindrava, a Georgian, and her mother was Russian. Due to her father's origin, her last name was originally rendered in Georgian as Khaindrava. She had several brothers, including Levan, and an older sister named Sabina. Khaindrova considered herself Russian throughout her life and used her last name in its Russian version, Khaindrova. She spent her early years at an estate owned by her grandfather in the village of Lekhaindravo in Georgia.

=== Emigration to China ===
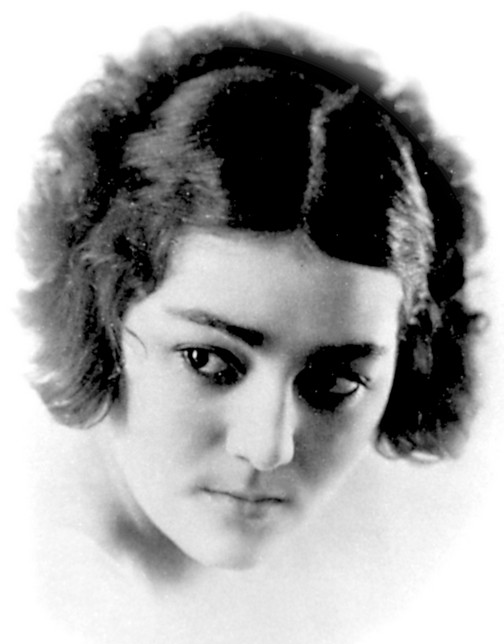
Another photograph of Khaindrova in the 1930s

Khaindrova's family became concerned during the years of turmoil that preceded the Russian Revolution. In 1916, her father took her with him to Harbin in Manchuria. Her father eventually became a leading figure in the Georgian community of Harbin. Khaindrova completed her primary and secondary education in Harbin. She was interested in poetry already as a young child and began writing her own poems while in elementary school.

Khaindrova first published her work in 1928 in the Russian-language newspaper RSlovo. She also published poems in journals such as Feniks, Parus, Bagul'nik and Zemlia Kolumba. While in Harbin she joined the literary circle Churaevka, which also included writers such as Valery Pereleshin, Larissa Andersen, and Arseny Nesmelov. Khaindrova had an influential position in Churaevka; in 1994, the author Helen Yakobson described her and Andersen as the "reigning queens of Churaevka". Nesmelov became somewhat of a mentor to Khaindrova and she later played a significant part in preserving his work. It was not possible for Khaindrova to solely live off of her writing and she thus also worked at the Zaria and Rubezh publishing presses in Harbin.

In addition to literature, Churaevka also engaged in political commentary, for instance criticizing the Soviet Union's dismantling the YMCA within its territory. Although Churaevka had stopped meeting by that point, Khaindrova and several other members published an anthology together in 1935, titled Convolutions. Each poet received five pages in the volume. Produced in 200 copies, Convolutions was not very successful and was met with mixed reception from reviewers.

In 1937, Khaindrova moved to Dalian, where she worked as a news correspondent. In Dalian she published her first collection of poems in 1939, titled Steps. The title referred to "the steps trodden on the difficult path of an émigré poet". She published her second collections of poems, Wings, in 1941. The title of the second collection refers to the power of poetry to "raise the poet above her sad existence". Khaindrova later moved to Qingdao, then to Tianjin, and then to Shanghai in 1943. The move to Shanghai was partly motivated by her brothers living in the city. In the same year she published her third collection of poems, Crossroads.

Khaindrova was going to publish a fourth collection of poems, Heart, in 1947 but nearly all copies were destroyed due to turmoil caused by the Chinese Communist Revolution; only a few copies in Khaindrova's personal possession are known to have survived.

=== Soviet Russia ===
In order to escape the turmoil of the Chinese Communist Revolution, Khaindrova and one of her friends, the bishop Viktor Sviatin, moved to Kazan in the Soviet Union in 1947. In Kazan, Khaindrova worked at the newspaper Krasnaya Tataria as a proofreader.

After having lived in Kazar for a while, Khaindrova moved to Krasnodar, where she worked as an English teacher. She was for a long time unable to get her writings published but managed to return to her literary career in the 1970s, when she began to participate in readings and literary meetings in Krasnodar. She was particularly active in encouraging young writers and poets. Her poems were occasionally published in magazines in the Kuban region and in a provincial journal in Krasnodar. Khaindrova sometimes also read her poems on the radio.

In 1968, Khaindrova learnt the address of Valery Pereleshin, whom had been part of her literary circle in Harbin, through an uncle of hers who lived in California. Khaindrova had lost contact with Pereleshin after she moved to the Soviet Union but from 1968 onwards she again corresponded frequently with him. She published her fifth and final collection of poems, Dates, Dates, in 1976. Dates, Dates included some of the poems she had previously published in Harbin and Shanghai.

Khaindrova died in Krasnodar on 19 June 1986.

== Writings and literary style ==
Khaindrova's literary style has been described as thoughtful and at times melancholic. Her work carries some influence from acmeist poetry. She and the other poets of the Curaevka literary circle are sometimes described as belonging to the "Harbin School" of Russian poets and Khaindrova is considered to be among the major Russian poets who were active in Harbin. Central themes present in much of her work is war, the longing for peace, the longing for home, and revolution. Unlike those of the older generation of Russian immigrants in China, Khaindrova's nostalgia for Russia was motivated not by vivid personal experiences but by vague childhood memories, patriotic education and tales from elders. Several of her poems include traditional Russian Orthodox Christian virtues such as meekness, humility and the necessity of finding consolation in religion. Khaindrova's favorite historical poets included Anna Akhmatova, Alexander Blok, Nikolay Gumilyov, Mikhail Lermontov and Boris Pasternak.

Khaindrova sometimes used the pseudonym "Eristavi" when publishing her writings. Besides her poems, Khaindrova also wrote some prose, though only one of her sketches are known to have been published. In addition to her five published poetry collections and surviving material from newspapers and journals, Khaindrova's daughter has also kept an archive of her writings.

== Personal life ==
Khaindrova married Alexei Leonidovich Serebrov in 1933. Their marriage eventually broke down. They had one daughter, Tatiana.
