= Jack Wagener =

English cricketer

Jack Gordon Wagener (20 January 1905 – 18 June 1986) was an English cricketer active from 1927 to 1931 who played for Sussex. He was born and died in Eastbourne. He appeared in twelve first-class matches as a lefthanded batsman who bowled left-arm orthodox spin. He scored 310 runs with a highest score of 80 not out and took eight wickets with a best performance of three for 74.
