= Glan Williams =

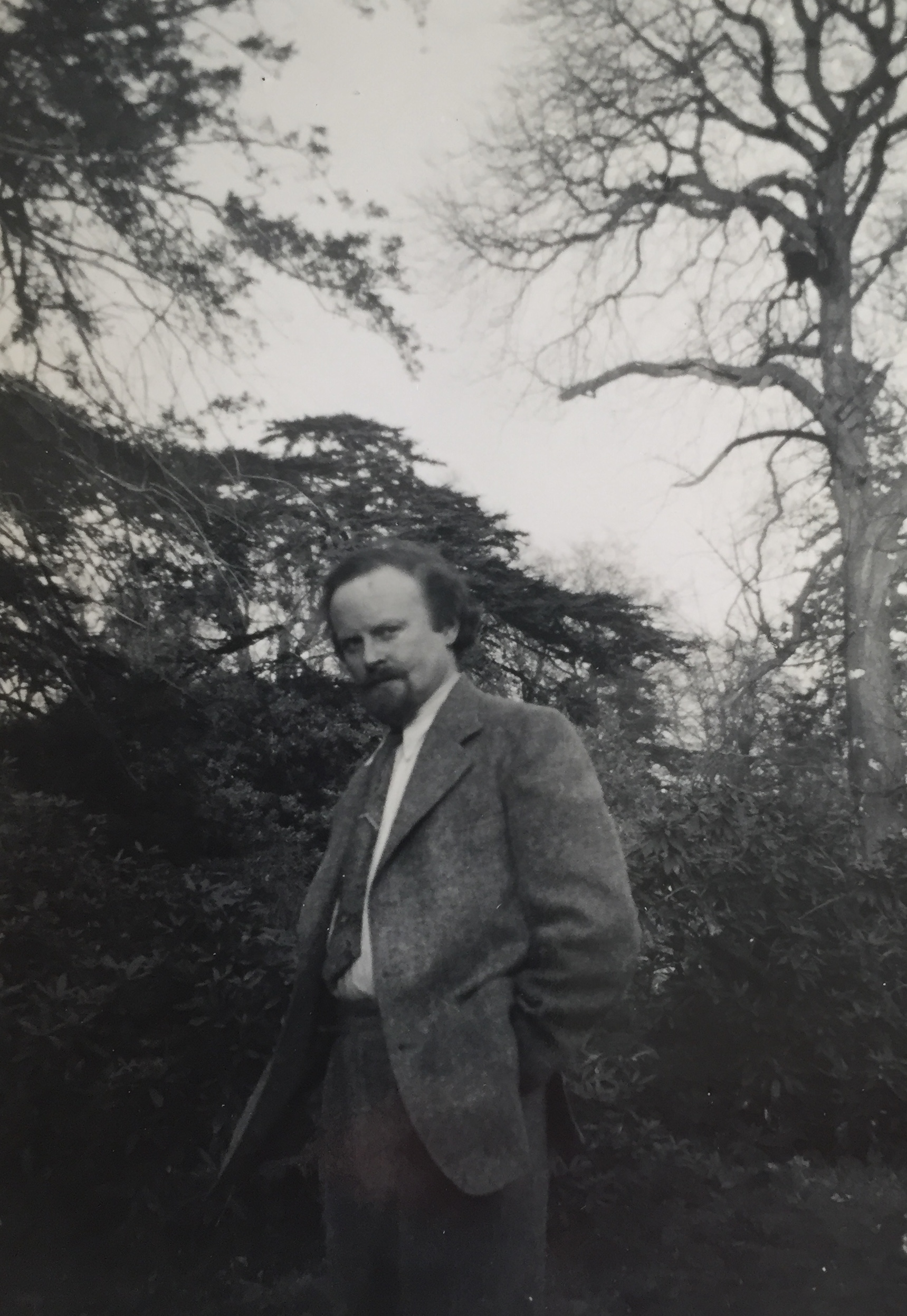
Glan Williams

Glan Williams (born Glanffrwd Owen Williams, 1 September 1911 – 9 June 1986) was a British caricaturist.

Glan Williams was born in Pentrechwyth, Swansea, Wales, the first of five children of Thomas Howell Williams and Mary Ann Owens. After winning a scholarship at age 14, he attended the Swansea School of Arts and Crafts (now part of Swansea Metropolitan University) from 1925 to 1931 where he became friends with other Swansea artists Mervyn Levy and Alfred Janes. He was appointed City Cartoonist to the London Express Newspapers in 1930 and continued working in the 1930s as a political cartoonist for the Sunday and Daily Express while also contributing illustrations to stories in the Daily Herald.

In 1940, he joined the Welsh Regiment but was posted to the camouflage unit in Norwich with Roland Penrose and Oliver Messel. Following the war, he worked as a commercial artist for the George Hopkinson Organisation and Fanfare Displays while continuing to work as a freelance cartoonist, being published in Tribune, Time and Tide and Sporting Life. He provided cover art and theatre review illustrations for The Tatler and Bystander, and the magazine featured him as "The Tatler's most recent discovery of a satirist of the contemporary scene" in 1954.

From 1958 to 1960, he was a political cartoonist for the News Chronicle until it merged with the Daily Mail. He also contributed cartoons for Reynolds News and continued to work for the paper after its merger with the Sunday Citizen until it closed in 1967. In 1970, he was recruited by George Gale to provide illustrations and covers for The Spectator. Throughout the seventies he contributed cartoons to the G. & M.W. Journal, What's On in London (especially from 1976 to 1982 including covers), Pacemaker (including covers), Nursing Times, and the Evening News. From 1976 until his death from lung cancer in 1986, he drew caricatures of many British parliamentarians for The House, a magazine of the British House of Commons. In remembering Glan, What's On in London said that his friends would miss "his ebullient conversation, which reflected his constant enthusiasm for old-time socialism, rugby football and all things Welsh."

Williams was married to Blanche "Lillie" Bunbury (née Ling) from 1948 until his death in London.
