= Ralph Pickford =

English psychologist

- Born: Ralph William Pickford; 11 February 1903; Christchurch, Hampshire, England
- Died: 7 June 1986 (aged 83)
- Education: Emmanuel College, Cambridge; University of Glasgow
- Spouse: Laura Ruth Bowyer (m. 1971–1986)
- Scientific career
- Fields: Psychology
- Workplaces: University of Glasgow
- Thesis: Psychological Problems in the History of Painting (1947)

Ralph William Pickford (11 February 1903 – 7 June 1986) was an English psychologist who served as the first Professor of Psychology at the University of Glasgow in Glasgow, Scotland, United Kingdom, from 1955 to 1973. He first joined the university's faculty in 1930, and received a D. Litt. degree from there in 1947. In 2005, the university established the Pickford Travelling Fellowship in his honor. In 1971, he married his second wife, Laura Ruth Bowyer, and they remained married until his death in 1986. Bowyer later provided one of the two bequests that was first used to fund the Pickford Travelling Fellowship (the other came from a trust set up after Pickford died).
