= Geoffrey Raphael =

English cricketer

Geoffrey Lewis Raphael (10 January 1910 – 12 June 1986) was an English first-class cricketer active 1926–28 who played for Middlesex. He was born in Westminster; died in Kensington.
