= Anthony Turner Andreasen =

Anthony Turner Andreasen FRSE FRCSE FICS MRCS
- Born: 18 November 1906
- Died: 8 June 1986 (aged 79)
- Education: Bedford Modern School; University of London

Anthony Turner Andreasen FRSE FRCSE MRCS (18 November 1906 – 8 June 1986) was a British surgeon, Chair of Surgery at Orissa Medical School, Chair of Surgery at the Calcutta Medical College, Surgeon to the Viceroy of India, Fellow of Surgery at Johns Hopkins University, Government Surgeon in Ghana and Uganda, author, and in his later years Professor of Surgery at the University of Cambridge.

== Biography ==
Anthony Turner Andreasen was born on 18 November 1906. He was educated at Bedford Modern School and the University of London.

Andreasen had a distinguished career in the Indian Medical Service holding chairs of surgery in Orissa and Calcutta and acting as surgeon to the Viceroy. He was elected a Fellow of the Royal Society of Edinburgh on 1 March 1943.

During World War II, he attained the rank of Lieutenant-Colonel on the North West Frontier. After the war, Andreason was invited to the United States to continue his pioneering research into open heart surgery and became Fellow of Surgery at Johns Hopkins University. His paper on low-flow physiology in the 1952 British Journal of Surgery greatly influenced the work of C. Walton Lillehei who was also at Johns Hopkins University.

Andreasen returned to Britain in 1954 to conduct further research before taking up the post of government surgeon in Ghana and Uganda. On his return to England in 1976 he took up a Professorship at the University of Cambridge.

Andreasen and his wife Simone had a son, who died in infancy. Andreasen himself died on 8 June 1986.
