= Archie Wood =

Scottish footballer

Personal information
- Full name: Archie Wood
- Date of birth: 18 March 1926
- Place of birth: Leven, Scotland
- Date of death: 17 June 1986 (aged 60)
- Place of death: Leven, Scotland
- Position: Winger

Senior career*
Years	Team	Apps	(Gls)
1949–1950	Tranmere Rovers	31	(5)
- * Club domestic league appearances and goals

Archie Wood (18 March 1926 – 17 June 1986) was a Scottish footballer, who played as a winger in the Football League for Tranmere Rovers.
