= Tom Lee (New Mexico politician) =

Navajo politician

Member of the New Mexico Senate from the 3rd district
- In office 1967–1978
- Preceded by: Jesse U. Richardson

Personal details
- Born: February 14, 1920 McKinley County, New Mexico, U.S.
- Died: June 4, 1986 (aged 66) Albuquerque, New Mexico, U.S.
- Party: Republican
- Spouse: Emma Rose Lee
- Children: 6
- Profession: Trading post operator, silversmith

Tom K. Lee (February 14, 1920 – June 4, 1986) was an American Navajo politician in the state of New Mexico.

Born at China Springs near Gallup in McKinley County, New Mexico, Lee lived in the Twin Lakes, New Mexico area where he owned and operated a trading post. He served with the United States Army in the Pacific Theatre of World War II and was a survivor of the Bataan Death March. The first Native American elected to the New Mexico Senate, Lee served as a Republican in for the district from 1967 to 1978. Initially approached in 1966 to run as a Democrat in the absence of a candidate, Lee opted to run as a Republican instead, and went on to serve three terms in the state senate. He later served on the Navajo Nation Council from 1978 to 1982 and as president of the Twin Lakes Navajo Chapter House.

Lee was married to Emma Rose Lee, an artist who designed/sewed one of the first Navajo Nation flags. They had six children and lived at Twin Lakes. A son, Clarence and grandson, Russell were both later noted artists and silversmiths. Lee died at a hospital in Albuquerque in 1986 at the age of 66. Following his funeral, he was buried at Sunset Memorial Park in Gallup.
