= Charles H. Hart =

American Mormon leader

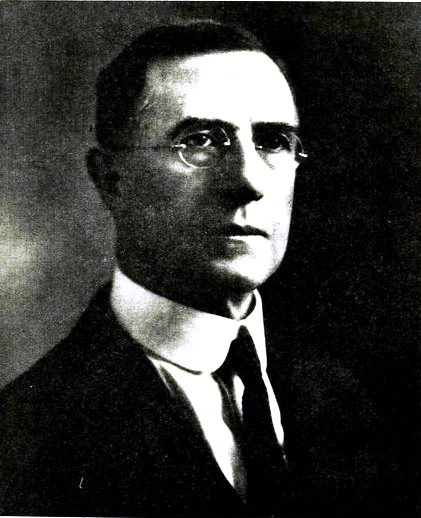
- Hart, c. 1934

First Council of the Seventy
- April 9, 1906 – September 29, 1934
- Called by: Joseph F. Smith

Personal details
- Born: Charles Henry Hart; July 5, 1866; Bloomington, Idaho Territory, United States
- Died: September 29, 1934 (aged 68); Salt Lake City, Utah, United States

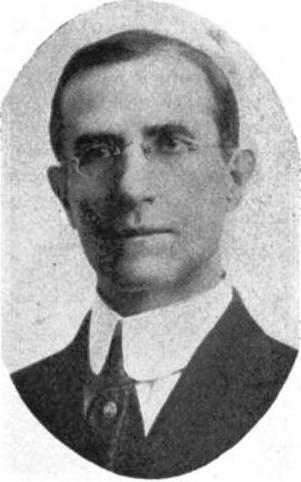
Hart c. 1920

Charles Henry Hart (July 5, 1866 – September 29, 1934) was a general authority and a member of the First Council of the Seventy of the Church of Jesus Christ of Latter-day Saints. Hart also served as president of the Canadian Mission of the LDS Church from 1927 to 1930.

Hart was born at Bloomington, Bear Lake County, Idaho Territory. When he was called as a member of the First Council of the Seventy in April 1906 he became the first general authority born in Idaho. He died from pneumonia at Salt Lake City, Utah.

== Notes ==
The Church of Jesus Christ of Latter-day Saints titles
Preceded by Christian D. Fjelsted	Member of the First Seven Presidents of the Seventy; April, 1906 – September 29, 1934	Succeeded by Rufus K. Hardy
