= Rufina of Smyrna =

Wealthy Jewish woman of antiquity

Rufina of Smyrna (2nd-3rd-century CE) is a wealthy Jewish woman of antiquity known only from a single funerary inscription on a tomb.

The Smyrniot Greek inscription attributed to her, first published in 1883, says:

"Rufina, Judean, head of the synagogue [archisynagogos], prepared the burial–niche for her freedmen and slaves. No one else has the authority to bury anyone else [here]. Now if anyone dares to do so, that person will pay 1500 denarii to the most holy treasury and 1000 denarii to the people [ethnos] of the Judeans. (10) A copy of this inscription was stored in the archive."

From the brief inscription, interpreters can surmise a few things about her life, and include them as evidence for expressions of Judaism in her place and time. For example, the inscription is explicit that she was Jewish. She held a title in a Smyrna synagogue. We presume she was wealthy for a number of reasons, such as: she could afford a lengthy inscription; she seems to have been the head of a household that comprised a significant number of enslaved people and freed formerly-enslaved people; and she left behind instructions that indicate that she had the clout to expect them to be carried out.

Like any ancient inscription, this one adds to the historical evidence for the period, in this case third-century Diaspora Judaism. Although she is referred to by the title "archisynagogos" which would normally be translated as "synagogue ruler" or "head of synagogue," for centuries this was dismissed as impossible by interpreters who held a priori assumptions that ancient Judaism never had female leadership. However, since the 1980s, scholars have aggregated a significant number of similar inscriptions that name women in various roles of Jewish leadership, including this one in which Rufina holds the office of ruler of the synagogue.

Wealthy women's patronage of, and leadership in, religious communities of the Ancient Mediterranean world was not the norm, but was nevertheless relatively common in some Jewish, Christian, and other Greco-Roman groups. What is uncommon about this inscription is that it is the only tomb in Ancient Mediterranean antiquity that we know of that was set up specifically and exclusively for the enslaved and freed members of the household, rather than for the family itself, as argued recently by Ross Kraemer, who is one of the world's experts on this particular inscription and on inscriptions with ancient Jewish women synagogue leaders in general.
