= Alfred Paul Dorjahn =

American historian (1894–1986)

Alfred Paul Dorjahn (11 July 1894 – 23 June 1986) was an American classicist. In 1924 he completed his PhD at the University of Chicago. His doctoral dissertation was The Athenian Political Amnesty of 403 BC.
