= Rufus Applegarth =

American lawyer and politician

Rufus W. Applegarth (August 2, 1844 – June 17, 1921) was an American lawyer and politician, a member of the Maryland House of Delegates.

== Biography ==
Born at Baltimore, Maryland, Applegarth attended public schools. Politically, he was a Republican. In 1895, he was elected to the Maryland House of Delegates, and in 1897 re-elected for a second term. He served as chairman of the judiciary committee of the house. In 1909 in London he successfully defended the 68 year-old composer and conductor Tito Mattei against a charge of breaking the speed limit. Applegarth had been a passenger in the vehicle and he successfully defended Mattei at the Police Court despite the prosecution's objections that Applegarth could not defend his client in an English court despite his 40 years experience as an American lawyer. However, despite these objections he got his client off the charge.

He died in 1921 after he was hit by the driver of an automobile as he walked across a street in Baltimore.
