= Karl Söllner =

Austrian physicist and chemist (1903–1986)

Karl Söllner (9 January 1903 – 14 June 1986) was an Austrian-American chemist, primarily active in the field of physical chemistry and biophysics.

== Life ==
Söllner was the son of lawyer Anton Maria Söllner and his wife Julie (née Karplus). He grew up in Vienna and began studying chemistry and philosophy at the University of Vienna in 1921. From his third semester he was a student assistant (Demonstrator) at the university. He completed his dissertation with Alfons Klemenc. In 1928 he entered the service of the Kaiser Wilhelm Institute for Physical Chemistry and Electrochemistry in Berlin, where he worked as a scientific assistant alongside Herbert Freundlich. In May 1933, Söllner began a habilitation thesis in the field of osmosis which was reviewed by Fritz Haber, Max Bodenstein and Herbert Freundlich.

Unfortunately, in the same year the Nazi party seized power. According to the national socialist definition he was of Jewish heritage and was therefore forced him to leave his position at the institute in June 1933. He then emigrated to Great Britain, where he found a position in the chemistry department of University College London, where he worked from 1933 to 1937. He was also a visiting researcher and consultant at Imperial Chemical Industries.

In 1937, Söllner moved to the United States. There he took a position as a chemist with the Department of Agronomy at Cornell University in Ithaca with support from the “Emergency Committee in Aid of Displaced German Scholars“. In 1938, he moved to the Department of Physiological Chemistry at the University of Minnesota School of Medicine in Minneapolis. There he was initially employed as an Associate Chemist. He was promoted to "Regular Chemist" in 1939, Associate Professor in 1943 and Full Professor in 1947.

Söllner was labelled as an enemy of the state by Nazi authorities. In the spring of 1940, the Reich Security Main Office in Berlin put him on a special Great Britain wanted list, a list of people who, in the event of a successful invasion and occupation of the British Isles by the Wehrmacht, should be identified and arrested as a priority by the SS special forces that followed the occupation forces.

Later Söllner moved to the Institute of Health in Bethesda, Maryland where he worked in the laboratory of National Institute of Arthritis Metabolism and Digestive Diseases, initially at the rank of Principal Research Analyst, from 1948 as a senior physical biochemist and from 1965 as head of the section for electrochemistry and colloid chemistry. In 1973 he officially retired, but continued to work as a consultant and visiting researcher for the institute until 1975.

Söllner was a specialist in ultrasound for colloid systems. In this context, he focused his research on the study of membranes and their electrophysical properties and on "Studies of Dispersion of Solids, Coagulation, and Fog Formation". Söllner published about 120 scientific papers in specialist journals. He was also a member of the American Association for the Advancement of Science, the American Institute of Chemistry and the New York Academy of Sciences, the American Chemical Society, the Society of General Physiologists and the Electrochemical Society.

== Family ==
Söllner married Herta (Helen) Rosenberg on July 23, 1934. Their daughter Barbara Sollner-Webb embarked on a scientific career.

== Publications ==
- Zur Kenntnis der thermischen Zersetzung der Salpetersäure, 1926.
- Zur Erklärung der abnormen Osmose an nichtquellbaren Membranen, I.-III. Teil, 1933.
- The Structure of the Colladion Membrane and Its Electrical Behavior, an Experimental Test of Some Aspects of the Teorell and Meyer-sievers Theories of Electrical Membrane Behavior, 1944.
