= Floyd Van Nest Schultz =

American electrical engineer (1910–1986)

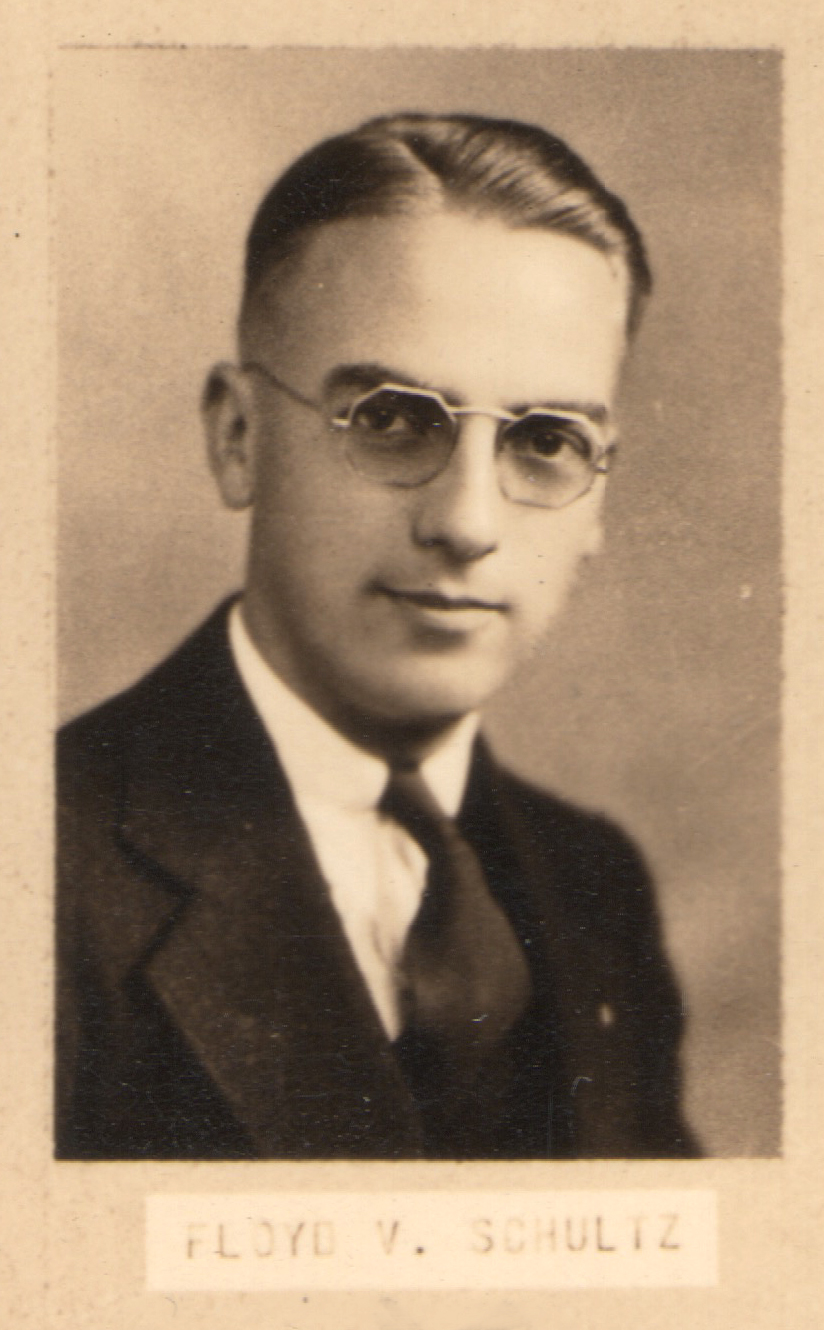
Photo of Dr. Floyd Van Nest Schultz taken In 1932

Floyd Van Nest Schultz (November 7, 1910 – June 18, 1986) was an American educator and electrical engineeringsScientist responsible for pioneering work in Radar and Radio. He received his Bachelor of Science in Electrical Engineering (6/1932), Masters of Science (9/1939) and PhD (6/1950) from University of Michigan, Ann Arbor. He was a professor of electrical engineering at University of Tennessee and Purdue University, was elected to the honorary societies: Tau Beta Pi, Eta Kappa Nu, Phi Kappa Phi, and Phi Eta Sigma and the Honorary Committee, and played flute in the University of Michigan Symphony Orchestra.

Schultz held multiple patents and published a wide range of engineering reports and papers. In 1950, he received his Ph.D from the University of Michigan for his thesis publication entitled; “Scattering by a Prolate Spheroid.” This is the theoretical determination of the scattering of both an incident electro-magnetic wave and the incident acoustic wave by a prolate spheroid. His work was done as part of the basic research phase of a US Air Force guided missile contract.

In addition to his educational career, Schultz held engineering positions at Globe Radio Manufacturing Co., Detroit, Gulf Research and Development Corp., Pittsburgh, Wilcox-Gay Corp., Charlotte, Michigan, Group Supervisor, Radar Laboratory, Wilbur Wright Field, Dayton, Ohio, and International Detrola Corp., Detroit, Michigan.

He married Julia Laurene Bovee in 1932 and had two children; Gretchen Lewis of Pittsburgh, Pennsylvania and Karl Herbert of Sherwood, Oregon. At the time of his death to lung cancer in Charlotte, North Carolina in 1986, he was survived by his second wife, Dorothy, three step-sons, one step-daughter, four grandchildren and seven step-grandchildren.

== Patents ==
- U.S. patent 3,202,995, "Steerable Circular Traveling-Wave Antenna" – Aug 24, 1965
- U.S. patent 2,511,014, "Diversity Receiving Combination" – Jun 13, 1950

== Publications ==
- Scattering by a Prolate Spheroid, Floyd VanNest Schultz, University of Michigan, 1950
- Atmospheric Pressure and Temperature Measurements Between The Altitudes of 40 and 110 Kilometers, University of Michigan, Engineering Research Institute, 1948
