= Rufus Flint =

Rufus Flint (born c. 1865) was a professor of English and mathematics at the National Autonomous University of Nicaragua, conducting early Central American biodiversity studies while enrolled at Cornell University. He took his degree in mechanical engineering from Cornell’s Sibley College of Engineering in 1887.

== The Nicaraguan Study ==
In August 1887, Professor Robert Henry Thurston, director of the Sibley College of Engineering at Cornell University, presented Rufus Flint’s three-year study of Nicaragua hardwoods to the American Association for the Advancement of Science. The impetus behind the Cornell research conducted by Flint was to assess the viability of exploiting Central American timber stands when the Northwest American forest resources were exhausted. As Appleton’s Cyclopedia record, the study, “. . . proved that in that country there exist most valuable varieties of wood. The present impending wood famine may, the speaker said, be averted by the use of tropical timber.”

== Family ==
Flint was the son of an American physician, Earl Flint. His mother was native to the Nicaraos nation. Dr. Flint arrived in Nicaragua from New England about 1850. He lived mainly in the cities of Granada and Rivas, Nicaragua, until his death in the late 1890s. In the 1870s, Earl Flint became an antiquities collector for the Smithsonian Institution. About 1878, he began working for the Peabody Museum of Archaeology and Ethnology at Harvard University about 1878, sending collections and letters to the museum until 1899. Rufus Flint donated land to build the sanctuary for the “Christo Negro”, or Black Christ, of La Conquista, Carazo, Nicaragua. La Conquista was named for the Spanish colonial response to an indigenous rebellion against imperial authority. His son, also named Rufus Flint, was the inaugural coach of the Nicaraguan soccer team, Railroad Star, in 1924. And in 1927, Rufus Flint, Jr. served as head of Nicaragua’s National Football League.

== Member ==
While at Cornell, he was tapped into the Phi Kappa Psi fraternity in 1885.
