= Helge Miettunen =

Finnish politician

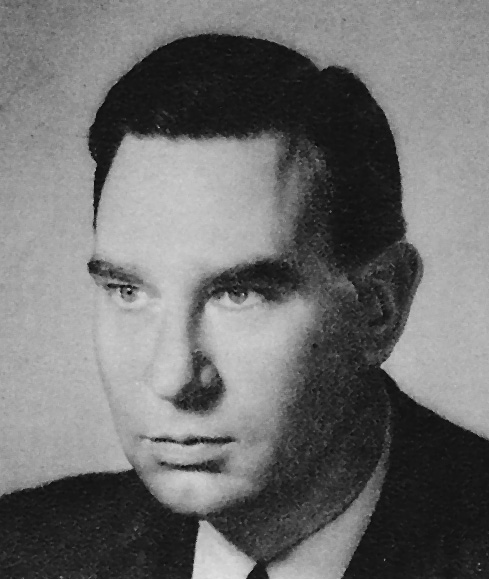
Finnish film professional

Helge Leonard Miettunen (9 September 1916 – 21 June 1986) was a Finnish writer, media executive and politician, born in Vaasa. He was a Member of the Parliament of Finland from 1951 to 1958, representing the People's Party of Finland.
