= Sid Plunkett =

English footballer

Personal information
- Full name: Sidney Ernest Plunkett
- Date of birth: 2 October 1920
- Place of birth: Norwich, England
- Date of death: 26 June 1986 (aged 65)
- Place of death: Norwich, England
- Position: Right winger

Senior career*
| Years | Team | Apps | (Gls) |
- Esdelle Works
- Norwich YMCA
| 1938–1939 | Norwich City | 3 | (0) |
| 1939–1945 | Wolverhampton Wanderers | 0 | (0) |
| 1939–1945 | → Norwich City (guest) | | |
| 1945–1947 | Norwich City | 28 | (7) |
| 1947–1952 | Chelmsford City | | |
| 1952–1954 | Great Yarmouth Town | | |
| 1954–1956 | Gorleston | | |
| 1956–1957 | Great Yarmouth Town | | |
- * Club domestic league appearances and goals

Sidney Ernest Plunkett (2 October 1920 – 26 June 1986) was an English footballer who played as a right winger.

== Career ==
Plunkett began his career with Norwich-based clubs Esdelle Works and Norwich YMCA. In April 1938, Plunkett signed for Norwich City as an amateur. On 5 November 1938, Plunkett made his debut for Norwich, playing in a 2–0 defeat against West Ham United. Plunkett made two further appearances for Norwich, appearing on the losing team both times, before joining Wolverhampton Wanderers in April 1939 after Norwich's relegation from the Second Division. As a result of World War II, Plunkett failed to make an appearance for Wolves, playing war-time football for Norwich, scoring 85 goals in 185 appearances. In December 1945, Plunkett moved back to Norwich permanently, where he made a further 28 Football League appearances, scoring seven times.

Ahead of the 1947–48 season, Plunkett dropped into Non-League football, signing for Chelmsford City. In Plunkett's debut season for the club, he scored seven goals in 35 appearances. In the 1948–49 season, Plunkett was Chelmsford's top scorer, scoring 27 goals in 43 appearances, as Chelmsford finished runners-up in the Southern League. The following season, Plunkett scored 43 goals in all competitions, as the club finished fourth in the Southern League. Plunkett's goalscoring exploits continued into the 1950–51 campaign, scoring 43 goals in 48 games as Chelmsford recorded another fourth place finish. In Plunkett's final season at Chelmsford, he once again finished as the club's top scorer, recording 18 goals, one more than fellow striker Doug Taft.

At the culmination of the season, after 140 goals in 220 appearances for Chelmsford, Plunkett moved closer to home, signing for Great Yarmouth Town. In November 1954, Plunkett signed for neighbours Gorleston, before returning to Great Yarmouth in August 1956, where he played for a final season, before retiring in 1957.
