= Soviet-Finnish wars =

The following is a list of Soviet-Finnish wars.

| Name | Finnish part | Russian part | Years | Result | Aftermath |
|---|---|---|---|---|---|
| Finnish Civil War | White Guard; German Empire | Red Guard; Soviet Russia | 1917–1918 | White guard victory | Russian presence in Finland ceased, Heimosodat |
| Soviet-Finnish border conflicts (Heimosodat) | Volunteers | Various | 1918–1922 | Undecided | Treaty of Tartu |
| Winter War | Finland | Soviet Union | 1939–1940 | Moscow Peace Treaty | Continuation War |
| Continuation War | Finland; Nazi Germany | Soviet Union | 1941–1944 | Soviet Victory | Moscow Armistice, Lapland War, Finlandization |
