= Jock McNaughton =

Scottish footballer

Personal information
- Full name: John McNaughton
- Date of birth: 19 January 1912
- Place of birth: Perth, Scotland
- Date of death: 27 June 1986 (aged 74)
- Place of death: Almondbank, Scotland
- Height: 5 ft 11 in (1.80 m)
- Position: Left back

Senior career*
Years	Team	Apps	(Gls)
19??–1934	Perth Roselea		
1934–1936	Nottingham Forest	11	(0)
1936–1946	Brighton & Hove Albion	6	(0)
- * Club domestic league appearances and goals

John McNaughton (19 January 1912 – 27 June 1986) was a Scottish professional footballer who played as a left back in the English Football League for Nottingham Forest and Brighton & Hove Albion.
