= Jules-Jean Ravel =

French trade unionist and communist politician

Jules-Jean Ravel (6 March 1901, in Guillaumes – 19 June 1986, in Nice), was a Communist politician and trade union organizer in Nice, France. Secretary of the trade union of gas workers of Nice from 1931 to 1933, he was also secretary of the Communist Party in the Nice sector, in 1935. After the Liberation, he was mayor of Guillaumes, a small village in the south-east of France, from 1944 to 1947, then a city councilor until 1953.
