= Ben Field (writer) =

American writer (1900–1986)

- Born: Moses Brahinsky; October 15, 1900; Russia
- Died: June 14, 1986 (aged 84); South Pasadena, California, U.S.
- Occupations: Writer, teacher
- Years active: 1935–1980
- Spouse(s): Jeanette Slotnick (1907–1984); 1 son, Joseph

Ben Field (pseudonym of Moe Bragin), (October 15, 1900 – June 14, 1986), was an American writer who authored five novels.

== Life and career ==
Moe Braginsky was five years old when he arrived at Ellis Island on March 25, 1906 with his then 26-year-old mother, Bessie, and a younger brother Jacob. They were to join their father, Joseph Bragin, who had come earlier. He attended the New York City public schools and got his baccalaureate degree from the City College of New York in 1923 and his Master of Arts degree from Columbia University in 1928. also taught at the Hebrew Institute of Boro Park. He worked as a machinist, a logger, and a farmhand when his family was low on income.

He started writing during the Great Depression, using his own name. He started to use his pseudonym, Ben Field, in 1934. He was included in the 1932 "Honor Roll" of distinctive short story writers. Short stories cited as distinctive were Cow, Flowers and Weeds, It Isn't Pie, New Tuxedo, No Groundhog's Life, Praying Mantis, and We Take Mama Out. The first three were included in the "Honor Roll."

His early reputation was established by short stories that are anthologized with the likes of William Faulkner, Ernest Hemingway, Katherine Porter, Eudora Welty and John Steinbeck. His first major work was a collection of short stories, The Cock's Funeral, published in 1937 with an introduction by Erskine Caldwell. This was followed by three novels, Outside Leaf, Piper Tompkins, The Last Freshet, all published in the forties. In 1971, he wrote his fifth novel, Jacob's Son. He died in South Pasadena, California in June 1986. He was a member of the League of American Writers.

== Published works ==
=== Major Works ===
- The Cock's Funeral. With an Introduction by Erskine Caldwell. NY: International Publishers, 1937.
- Outside Leaf. NY: Reynal & Hitchcock, 1943.
- Piper Tompkins. Garden City, NY: Doubleday & Company, Inc., 1946.
- The Last Freshet. Garden City, NY: Doubleday & Company, Inc., 1948.
- Jacob's Son. NY: Crown Publishers, Inc., 1971.

Short Stories and Poems

- An Answer for My Uncle in Kerker Quinn and Charles Shattuck, eds., Accent Anthology, NY: Harcourt, Brace and Company, 1946, pp. 87–98.
- A Lesson in Joseph Gaer, ed., Our Lives: American Labor Stories, NY: Boni and Gaer, 1948, pp. 96–102.
- The Little Jew, My Brother in The California Quarterly, Vol. 3, Number 4, 1955, pp. 3–19.
- A New York Form in The Stratford Magazine, Vol. V, Number 6, July 1930, 00. 20–24.
- Cake in The Midland, Vol. XVII, Number IV, January/February 1931, pp. 60.
- Cow in The Hound & Horn, Vol. IV, Number 4, July–September 1931, p. 556–568. Anthologized in Granville Hicks et al., eds., Proletarian Literature in the United States: An Anthology, NY: International Publishers, 1935, pp. 71–79; as well as in Jack Salzman, ed. Years of Protest: A Collection of American Writings of the 1930s, NY: Pegasus, 1967, pp. 311–319.
- The Eclipse in Partisan Review, Vol. I, Number 3, June–July 1934, pp. 27–29.
- Flowers and Weeds in Midland, Vol. 19, March–April 1932, p. 50.
- From an Eastern Farm: Night – The Farmer's Daughter in Poetry: A Magazine of Verses, Vol. XXXVII, Number IV, January 1931, 00. 200–201.
- The Grasshopper is Stirring! in Granville Hicks et al., eds., Proletarian Literature in the United States: An Anthology, NY: International Publishers, 1935, pp. 71–79.
- It Isn't Pie in Clay, Autumn 1931, p. 27.
- In Egypt in Dorothy Scarborough, ed., Selected Short Stories of Today. NY: Farrar & Rinehart, 1935, pp. 174–188. (Also published in The Massachusetts Review: A Quarterly of Literature, the Arts and Public Affairs, Vol. 1, Number 3, May 1960, pp. 417–437.)
- The Japanese Kimono in Copy, 1930: Stories, Plays, Poems, and Essays. NY: E. Appleton and Company, 1930, pp. 38–47.
- Maxie Ganew in Maxim Lieber, ed., Das Amerikanische Jahrhundert, Leipzig: Paul List Verlag, 1957, pp. 210–229. Trans. Arthur Bagemühl.
- The Market in John Lehmann, ed., New Writing, London: Lawrence and Wishart, 1937, pp. 225–234.
- The New Housekeeper in Nicholas Moore, ed., The Book of Modern American Short Stories, London: Editions Poetry, 1945, pp. 149–160.
- New Tuxedo in Pagany', Oct-Dec 1931, p. 104.
- No Groundhog's Life in Pagany, April–June 1932, p. 93.
- The Praying Mantis in The New Republic, February 3, 1932, p. 322.
- The Sheep Dip in Partisan Review, Vol. I, Number 1, February–March 1934, pp. 24–31.
- Three Sisters in Massachusetts Review: A Quarterly of Literature, the Arts and Public Affairs, Volume 1, Number 3, May 1960, pp. 417–437.
- We Take Mama Out in Opportunity: A Journal of Negro Life, February 1, 1932.
- Whom the Ox Gored in New Directions in Prose &Poetry, 1941 Mount Vernon: New Directions, 1941, pp. 391–406.
- Work in Prairie Schooner, Vol. 4, Number 3, Summer 1930, p. 144. (Also published in The Menorah Journal, Vol. XIX, Number 4, June 1931, pp. 447–452.)

=== Essays ===
- Israel Zangwill: A Vital Force in Morris U. Schappes, ed., "Jewish Currents" Reader, NY: Jewish Currents, Inc., 1966, pp. 240–246.
- Journal of a Tour in America in The American Mercury, Vol, XXVI, June 1932, pp. 199–208.
- Obituary for Jewish Art Theater in The Hound & Horn, Vol. XX, January–March 1932, pp. 283–287.
