= Rufus C. Somerby =

American entertainer, showman, and panoramist

Rufus Choate Somerby
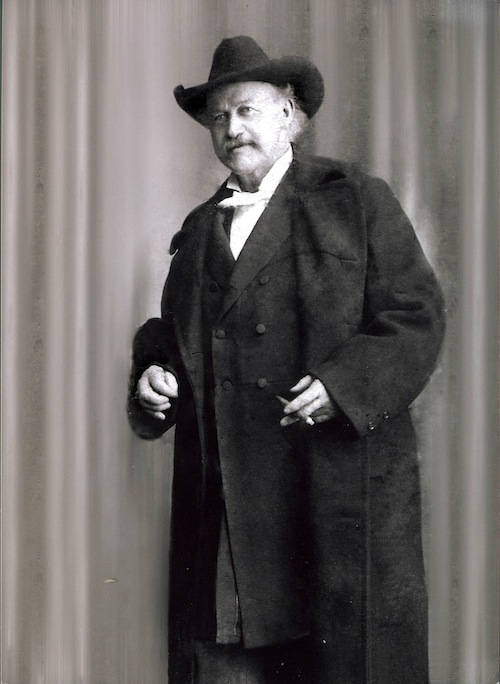
- Born: 1832 (March 31)
- Died: 1903 (November 30); Cambridge, Massachusetts
- Other name: Dr. Judd
- Occupations: Panoramist and Showman
- Known for: Arctic panoramas

Rufus C. Somerby (1832–1903) was an American entertainer, showman, and panoramist in the mid-nineteenth century, and one of a very few men of his profession to leave behind any memoirs or account of his activities. He is chiefly known through a series of articles published in 1903 and 1904 in The Billboard, the ancestor of today's "Billboard Magazine," which at the time was a trade journal for circus, carnival, and theatrical performers and managers. Somerby operated several moving panoramas under the management of Boston's George K. Goodwin, including a panorama of "Dr. Kane's Arctic Voyages," and also was involved in mechanical theatres. He worked as an agent for P.T. Barnum, bringing one such mechanical theatre, "Thiodon's Theatre of Arts," from the United Kingdom to the United States for an exhibition at Barnum's American Museum. After this mechanical show completed its run, he oversaw its re-making into two smaller such theatres, one of which had its figures re-painted by a panorama broker in Providence, Rhode Island to present not "The Battle of Balaclava" in the Crimean War but the assault on Fort Sumter.

Somerby may possibly have served in the U.S. Civil War; a man of that name was a lieutenant in both Companies "A" and "B" of the Ninth Kentucky Infantry Regiment. In any case, after the war he returned to the show trade, working with the well-known Boston actor and theatrical agent Edward P. Kendall as part of a variety troupe, established in 1867, which toured the country. Other members of this troupe included John Maguire, Barney McNulty, C. Amory Bruce, L. M. W. Steere and D. B. Hodges. Somerby also headed his own bills as a professional lecturer; in 1877, there is a record of his operating his own Fair, which included himself as "graphic lecturer" (probably with a panorama), O-car Shaffer, a "facial contortionist," Shaffer's wife the singer Louise Shaffer, and a player of the "musical glasses" (probably a sort of glass harmonica).

== Articles in The Billboard ==
Somerby's career is known chiefly through a series of articles which appeared in The Billboard between December 1903 and December 1904 under the by-name "Doctor Judd." In these columns, the good Doctor offered his reminiscences over the decline of the panorama trade, which by then was almost entirely eclipsed by motion picture exhibition; he remarks that "all the old panorama men who catered to the last generation with their exhibitions are fast passing away, and soon they and their shows will be forgotten." Yet puzzlingly, although Dr. Judd goes on to lament the recent death in Boston of Rufus Somerby, the first-person accounts given in the articles are all of shows at which Somerby was the lecturer. It's possible that the author, an acquaintance of Somerby, worked alongside him in some capacity, or is quoting from some memoir written by him. Or, alternatively, the "Judd" identity, and the conceit that he mourns the passing of Somerby, may be a ploy, and Somerby himself may have been "Dr. Judd." Be that as it may, the description of Somerby's activities is rich in period detail:

I first met Rufus Somerby years and years ago, in what was then called, the Western Country—Ohio, Michigan, Indiana, and Illinois—when we had but few railroads, and all shows then travelling had to have their own conveyances or take the public stages to get over the country. In those days, Somerby was exhibiting a panorama called the "Pilgrim [sic] Progress," travelling in his own red wagon throughout the above named states. Wandering about those states in the early days with our panoramas we had to exhibit in all kinds of places: sometimes the dining room of various taverns, then an empty store would be turned into an exhibition room. Other times the school or court-house would be utilized. A number of times, our 'hall"'was the village blacksmith shop.

Dr. Judd goes on to relate his travels with a series of moving panoramas, beginning with Bullard's Panorama of New York City, and continuing through an account of his association with George K. Goodwin's Panorama of Kane's Arctic Explorations in 1857. Handbills for this panorama confirm that Somerby was the lecturer, and that the show had its debut in East Boston late in 1857. Yet other of Dr. Judd's claims are not necessarily reliable; he speaks of Dr. Kane himself visiting the panorama (unlikely, given that Kane had been dead for many months), and recalls that a Danish "Eskimo" boy, "Hans Christian," one of Kane's guides, appeared with the show (the actual Hans was, at the time, still in Greenland). Nevertheless, Dr. Judd regales his readers with a colorful account of the panorama's success.

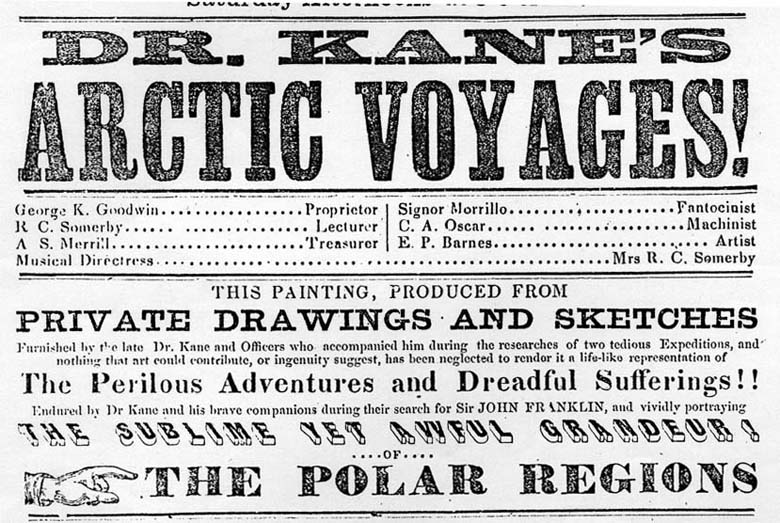
Detail from an advertisement for Goodwin's Kane Panorama of 1857, listing R.C. Somerby

A highlight is his claim—undocumented, quite possibly spurious, but entertaining nevertheless—that while appearing with the show in Springfield, Illinois, he was involved in a dispute over a debt tied to one of the horses that drew his wagon, and sought out the law firm of "Lincoln and Herndon." Not surprisingly, Abraham Lincoln was able to swiftly resolve the dispute, and Dr. Judd rewarded him with complimentary tickets to the panorama; "that evening he attended it, accompanied by one of his sons."

Dr. Judd's other reminiscences are of a similar sort, regaling his readers with tales of travel by wagon, steamship, packet boat, and train to every hinterland of the nation. In the December, 1904 installment, "The Old Panorama," he recounts how he, (again, apparently speaking for or as Somerby), traveled to England to secure J.P. Thiodon's mechanical "Theatre of Arts" for a run at Barnum's American Museum. This mechanical show, whose many tiny mechanical figures were activated by a clever series of leather belts, subsequently toured the U.S.; once again, as fate would have it, Dr. Judd's account leads him to another encounter with a man soon to be famous. When one of the leather belts that activated the figures breaks down in Galena, Illinois, Judd seeks out the help of a local leather shop, which turns out to be that operated by Orville and Ulysses S. Grant. Once again, complimentary tickets are given, and the future general enjoys his visit to the Panoramist's show.

Thiodon's theater's central showpiece was a scene of the Siege of Sevastopol (1854–1855) in the Crimean War, but by the time its western tour was winding down, the U.S. Civil War had broken out, and the Crimean was out of all favor. The ever-resourceful Judd had the theater separated into two pieces by a panorama broker in Providence, Rhode Island, one of which was repainted to resemble the attack on Fort Sumter. The transformation was remarkably simple: "Our figures of Russian soldiers did not need much paint to turn them into Secessionists"; Lord Raglan was remade as Major Anderson, and a model of Fort Sumter was slipped over an extra patch of the Black Sea. Dr. Judd also describes his work with the American humorist Artemis Ward, whose show was advertised as being accompanied by a "very middling panorama", so already at this stage Dr. Judd was parodying what was soon to become a forgotten medium.
