= Rufus K. Hardy =

American LDS Church leader (1879–1945)

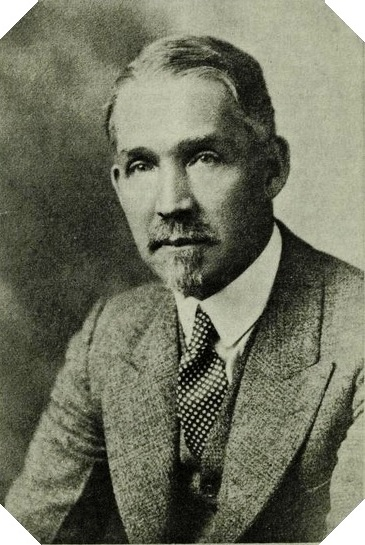
- Hardy, c. 1934

First Council of the Seventy
- October 6, 1934 – March 7, 1945
- Called by: Heber J. Grant

Personal details
- Born: Rufus Kay Hardy; May 28, 1878; Salt Lake City, Utah Territory, United States
- Died: March 7, 1945 (aged 66); Salt Lake City, Utah, United States

Rufus Kay Hardy (May 28, 1878 – March 7, 1945) was an American missionary for the Church of Jesus Christ of Latter-day Saints in New Zealand and was a general authority of the LDS Church from 1935 until his death.

Hardy was born in Salt Lake City, Utah Territory. In 1897, church apostle John Henry Smith ordained Hardy to be a seventy and set him apart to be a missionary in New Zealand. Hardy served in New Zealand as a church missionary from 1897 to 1901. Hardy would return to New Zealand twice as the president of the church's New Zealand Mission from 1907 to 1909 and from 1933 to 1934.

In 1935, Hardy became a member of the church's First Council of the Seventy, and served in this position until his death in Salt Lake City from myocarditis. He was married to Adelaide Underwood Eldredge and was the father of one daughter.

== Notes ==
The Church of Jesus Christ of Latter-day Saints titles
Preceded by Charles H. Hart	Member of the First Council of the Seventy; October 6, 1934 - March 7, 1945	Succeeded by S. Dilworth Young
