= Rufus Stokes =

- Rufus Stokes circa 1940
- Born: September 3, 1924; Phenix City, Alabama, US
- Died: June 22, 1986 (aged 61); Claremont, California, US
- Occupation: Inventor
- Children: 6

Rufus Stokes (September 3, 1924 – June 22, 1986), an African American inventor, was born in Phenix City, Alabama.

== Early life ==
Rufus Stokes grew up in the rural American South and attended public school in Alabama until he was 18 years old. On November 5, 1940, just before receiving his high school diploma, Rufus Stokes enlisted in the US Army at Fort Benning, Georgia in the Quartermaster Corps.

In the Army, he attended a technical school where he received auto mechanic training. He was deployed in western Europe and served predominantly in the Rhineland campaign. Upon his discharge, he was decorated with an American Defense Service Medal, European-African-Middle Eastern Campaign Medal, and Good Conduct Medal.

While leaving the military, Stokes met Bessie Lee Knight, his future wife, of Camp Hill, Alabama when she was attending Tuskegee Institute. Army records indicate that he was married at the time of his discharge in 1945.

Soon after, they moved to Kansas City, Missouri, where Stokes was employed as a part-time auto mechanic. In 1947, they moved once again, to Waukegan, Illinois where he found temporary employment as a pipe and sheet metal worker.

Between late 1947 and 1949, Stokes was employed as an orderly at the Chicago Veterans Administration Hospital, specifically in the Tuberculosis Sanitarium. It was during this time that he first saw the negative health effects of the city's pollution. In 1949, he left the hospital and found work at Brule Inc., an incinerator manufacturing company in Chicago. He quickly learned the process of combustion and was thought to have contributed heavily in the designs of new incinerators, but was never credited for his work. For that reason, he left to pursue his own interests.

== Accomplishments ==
Air Pollution Control Device

He later created a smaller domestic version and a larger mobile version of the air purification device to show its versatility. This device further reduced the ash emissions of the furnace and power plant smokestack emissions. Moreover, it was not limited by design and configuration, meaning that its efficiency remained excellent regardless of industrial or residential applications. This was not true of typical air pollution control technologies, such as electrostatic precipitators, bag houses, and wet scrubbers. The larger the device that utilized these approaches, the more cumbersome and inefficient it became. The core of Stokes' technology was a unique utilization of what he described as "the three Ts": Temperature, Time, and Turbulence. In his patent applications (U.S., U.K., Germany, and Japan), he provided only data sufficient to obtain patent approval. Other critical processes involving variations of physics were not revealed but nevertheless manifest in demonstrations to municipal, state and federal officials and engineering firms such as A.T. Kearney. The ability of the APC-100 to convert particulate matter and toxic gases resulting from the burning of rubber tires and other combustibles to steam was a constant source of intrigue to those who witnessed its operation.

In 1982, Rufus Stokes was granted a doctor of science degree from Heed University in Hollywood, Florida on account of his scientific achievements.

In 1985, he moved to Claremont, California, where he died of mesothelioma, an asbestos-related disease, in 1986. His death coincided with his being brought in as a consultant to the Los Angeles Hyperian Waste Water Treatment facility.

Stokes' inventions led to a direct improvement to air quality, but more importantly, brought attention to the idea that scientists could work to reduce pollution and harmful gases in the atmosphere. Notably, he has been honored with inclusion in the United States Department of Energy's (DOE) list of "Energy Pioneers", as well as being acknowledged in the technology white paper "Quantum Parallel".

Many of his research and development papers, correspondence and diagrams are included in archival data donated to the University of Illinois at Chicago Library by publisher/graphic artist and military aviator Eugene Winslow, a long time friend and business colleague.
