= Alfred Goulder =

English cricketer

Alfred Goulder (16 August 1907 – 11 June 1986) was an English first-class cricketer, who played two matches for Yorkshire County Cricket Club in 1929.

Born in Attercliffe, Sheffield, Yorkshire, England, Goulder was a left arm orthodox spinner and left-handed tail end batsman, who made his debut against an 'All England XI' at Bramall Lane, Sheffield, at the end of July 1929. He did not bat as Alan Barber (100) and Edgar Oldroyd (143) put on 203 for the second wicket, to help Yorkshire post 320 for 4. He bowled 11 overs and took the wickets of Eddie Dawson and Alan Shipman for 21, before rain forced the abandonment of the final day's play. His second, and final game, was the County Championship clash against Derbyshire again at Bramall Lane, in August. Batting at number eleven, he fell leg before wicket to Tommy Mitchell for three runs, and his only success with the ball came when he dismissed Stan Worthington, caught by Frank Dennis, for six. He finished with a first-class career bowling average of 30.00.

He appeared for the Yorkshire Second XI from 1928 to 1930. For many years he played for Sheffield United Cricket Club, and also had a spell with Rawmarsh C.C.

Goulder died in Sheffield in June 1986.
