= Hart =

Hart often refers to:

- Hart (deer)
- Hart (surname)

Hart may also refer to:

== Organizations ==
- Hart Racing Engines, a former Formula One engine manufacturer
- Hart Skis, US ski manufacturer
- Hart Stores, a Canadian chain of department stores
- Hart's Reptile World, a zoo in Oregon, United States
- Harts Stores, a defunct American chain of department stores
- Hart Tools, a brand of Techtronic Industries

== People ==
- Hart (given name)
- Hart (surname)
  - Hart family, a family of Canadian professional wrestlers, plus some American and British wrestlers related by marriage
    - The Hart Foundation, a number of tag teams or stables, most of them featuring second-generation members of the above family
      - The Hart Dynasty, a late-2000s WWE stable that included third-generation members of the family
- Hart family murders, a 2018 murder–suicide by Jennifer and Sarah Hart, who murdered their six adopted children

== Places ==
=== Austria ===
- Hart, Austria

=== Australia ===
- Hart, Northern Territory, a locality
- Hart, South Australia, a locality
- Cape Hart Conservation Park, a protected area in South Australia

=== Greenland ===
- Hart Glacier (Greenland)

=== United Kingdom ===
- Hart District, Hampshire, England
- Hart, County Durham, England
- Hart Fell, a hill in Scotland
- River Hart, a tributary in Hampshire

=== United States ===
- Hart, California
- Hart, Michigan
- Hart, Minnesota
- Hart, Missouri
- Hart, Macon County, Missouri
- Hart, Texas
- Hart County (disambiguation)
- Hart Island (disambiguation)
- Hart Township (disambiguation)

== Buildings ==
- Hart House (Alberta), historic house of the Hart wrestling family
- Hart House (University of Toronto), a student centre

== Military ==
- Hawker Hart, a Royal Air Force biplane light-bomber
- USS Hart, US Navy ships

== Music ==
- Hart (album), a 2008 album by rapper Brainpower
- The Hart, a 2025 album by rock band Grayscale

== Computing ==
- A hardware thread in RISC-V processor architecture
- Highway Addressable Remote Transducer Protocol

== See also ==
- HART (disambiguation)
- Harte (disambiguation)
- Harts (disambiguation)
- Hartt
- Heart (disambiguation)
- Justice Hart (disambiguation)
- Major Hart River
