= Hart Township =

Hart Township may refer to:

- Hart Township, Warrick County, Indiana
- Hart Township, Michigan
- Hart Township, Winona County, Minnesota
- Hart Township, Wright County, Missouri
- Hart Township, Roberts County, South Dakota, in Roberts County, South Dakota

== See also ==
- Hart Lake Township, Minnesota
- Hartford Township (disambiguation)
- Hartland Township (disambiguation)
