= Harts =

Harts may refer to:

- Harts (surname)
- Harts (musician), Melbourne indie musician
- Harts, West Virginia, United States
- Harts Stores, a regional general merchandise chain in the midwestern United States
- Hong Kong Amateur Radio Transmitting Society

== See also ==
- Arts
- Hart (disambiguation)
- Harts Bluff
- Harts Hill
- Harts Range
- Harts River
- Hearts (disambiguation)
