= Elkhart Lake =

Elkhart Lake may refer to:

== Places ==
- Elkhart Lake, Wisconsin, a village and a lake in the US
- Elkhart Lake-Glenbeulah High School, Elkhart Lake, Wisconsin, US
- Road America, a motorsports racetrack near Elkhart Lake, Wisconsin, US, also known as Elkhart Lake

== Other uses ==
- Elkhart Lake (microprocessor), an Intel CPU microarchitecture

== See also ==
- Elkhart (disambiguation)
- Elk Lake (disambiguation)
- Hart Lake (disambiguation)
