= Hart Lake =

Hart Lake may refer to:

== Cities, towns, townships etc. ==
Hart Lake Township in Hubbard County, Minnesota

== Lakes ==
- Hart Lake, a lake in Faribault County, Minnesota
- Hart Lake (Hubbard County, Minnesota)
- Hart Lake (Swift County, Minnesota)
- Hart Lake (Oregon), a lake in Lake County, Oregon
- Hart Lake (Cumberland), a lake in Cumberland County, Nova Scotia
- Hart Lake (Guysborough), a lake in Guysborough District, Nova Scotia
- Hart Lake (Parry Sound District), a lake in Parry Sound District, Ontario
- Hart Lake (Macdonald, Meredith and Aberdeen Additional), a lake in Macdonald, Meredith and Aberdeen Additional, Ontario
- Hart Lake (Frontenac County), a lake in South Frontenac township, Frontenac County, Ontario
- Hart Lake (Thunder Bay District), a lake in Thunder Bay District, Ontario
- Hart Lake (Sudbury District), a lake in Sudbury District, Ontario
- Hart Lake (Cochrane District), a lake in Cochrane District, Ontario
- Hart Lake (Haig Township, Algoma District), a lake in Algoma District, Ontario
- Hart Lake (Muskoka District), a lake in Muskoka District, Ontario
