= Heart River =

Heart River may refer to:

Rivers

- Heart River (North Dakota), a river in North Dakota, US
- Heart River (Wyoming), a river in Yellowstone National Park, Wyoming, US
- Heart River (Alberta), a river in north-western Alberta, Canada

Place

- Heart River, Alberta, a settlement in Alberta, Canada

== See also ==
- Bad Heart River, a river in north-western Alberta, Canada
- Sick Heart River, a novel by Scottish author John Buchan set in Canada
- Heart (disambiguation)
