= Heart (disambiguation) =

A heart is a muscular organ that pumps blood in various species.

Heart may also refer to:

- Heart symbol, a symbol (♡) representing love, the organ, or a card suit
- A synonym for soul

== Arts, entertainment, and media ==
=== Film and television ===
- The Heart (1955 film), a Japanese film
- The Heart (1973 film), a Japanese film
- Heart (1987 film), an American film
- Heart (1999 film), a British film
- Heart (2006 film), an Indonesian film
- "Heart" (Glee), an episode of Glee
- "Heart" (Supernatural), an episode of Supernatural
- "The Heart" (The Amazing World of Gumball), an episode of The Amazing World of Gumball

=== Radio stations ===
- DXCO-FM, a radio station in Cagayan de Oro, Philippines, branded as 92.7 Heart FM
- DXIZ, a radio station in Maramag, Bukidnon, Philippines, branded as 93.7 Heart FM
- Heart (radio network), a United Kingdom radio network
- Radio Heart, the former names of Singapore radio stations One FM 91.3 and UFM 1003

=== Other media ===
- The Heart, a podcast distributed by Radiotopia

== Literature ==
- Heart (novel), an 1886 children's book by Edmondo De Amicis
- The Heart (novel), a 2014 novel by Maylis de Kerangal
- Heart: The City Beneath, a tabletop roleplaying game
- Heart (journal), a journal covering cardiovascular medicine and surgery
- Clinical Science (journal) or Heart, an academic journal
- Kokoro, a Japanese novel, the title can be translated as "Heart"

== Music ==
=== Bands ===
- Heart (band), American rock band

=== Albums ===
- Heart (L'Arc-en-Ciel album) (1998)
- Heart (Audrey Assad album) (2012)
- Heart (Eric Church album) (2021)
- Heart (The City Harmonic album) (2013)
- Heart (Elisa album) (2009)
- Heart (Heart album) (1985)
- Heart (Amanda Lear album) (2001)
- Heart (Stars album) (2003)
- Heart (Tokio album) (2014)
- Heart (Yuna Ito album) (2007)
- Heart (EP), by Jane Remover (2025)
- The Heart (album), a 2010 album by Jimmy Gnecco
- Heart, a 2003 album by Heart Evangelista
- Heart, an EP by Aleksander Vinter

=== Songs ===
- "Heart" (Do As Infinity song) (1999)
- "Heart" (Pet Shop Boys song) (1988)
- "The Heart" (song), by Lacy J. Dalton (1989)
- Six songs by Kendrick Lamar and one by Drake:
  - "The Heart Part 1" by Lamar (2010)
  - "The Heart Part 2" by Lamar, from his mixtape Overly Dedicated (2010)
  - "The Heart Part 3" by Lamar (2012)
  - "The Heart Part 4" by Lamar (2017)
  - "The Heart Part 5" by Lamar (2022)
  - "The Heart Part 6" by Drake, a diss track aimed at Lamar (2024)
  - "Heart Pt. 6" by Lamar (2024)
- "Heart", a song by Ai Otsuka from the 2007 single "Peach/Heart"
- "Heart", a song by Booth and the Bad Angel from their eponymous album
- "Heart", a song by Erra from their debut album Impulse, 2011
- "Heart", a song by Max Bygraves, 1957
- "Heart", a song by Neneh Cherry from her debut album Raw Like Sushi, 1989
- "Heart", a song by Petula Clark from I Know a Place
- "Heart", a song by Toya Delazy from Due Drop
- "Heart", a song by Rockpile from Seconds of Pleasure
- "Heart", a song by Sault from Air
- "Heart (Stop Beating in Time)", a song by Leo Sayer from Have You Ever Been in Love
- "Heart", a song by Britney Spears, the B-side to the single "Lucky"
- "Heart", a song by Voisper from Voice + Whisper
- "(You've Got to Have) Heart", a song from the musical comedy Damn Yankees
- "Heart", a song by Jars of Clay from the album The Long Fall Back to Earth, 2009
- "Human Heart" a song by Coldplay from the album Music of the Spheres, 2021

== Sport ==
- Heart of Midlothian F.C., a Scottish football club
- Melbourne Heart FC, an Australian soccer team

== People ==
- Heart Evangelista (born 1985), Filipina actress and singer
- Heart (surname)

=== Fictional characters ===
- Margaret Grace "Heart" L. de Jesus, a character in the 2017 ABS-CBN drama series My Dear Heart

== Places ==
- The Heart (Pluto) or Tombaugh Regio, a prominent feature on the dwarf planet Pluto
- Heart Peaks, a volcano in northern British Columbia, Canada
- Heart Mountain (Alberta)
- Heart Nebula
- Heart River (disambiguation)

== Other uses ==
- Heart (category theory), an abelian category in a t-structure, a concept in homological algebra
- Heart (Chinese constellation), one of the Twenty-eight mansions of the Chinese constellations
- Heart (Chinese medicine), a zàng-fǔ organ stipulated by traditional Chinese medicine
- Heart (mobile design), a mobile design and metric framework
- Heart of palm
- Heart stage, a stage of plant embryogenesis
- Health Equity and Access Reform Today Act of 1993
- Holocaust Era Asset Restitution Taskforce by Israeli government
- Human error assessment and reduction technique
- HEART Party, an Australian anti-vaccination, anti-fluoridation and COVID sceptic political party

== See also ==
- Hart (disambiguation)
- Hearts (disambiguation)
