= Heart Lake (Wyoming) =

Lake in Yellowstone National Park

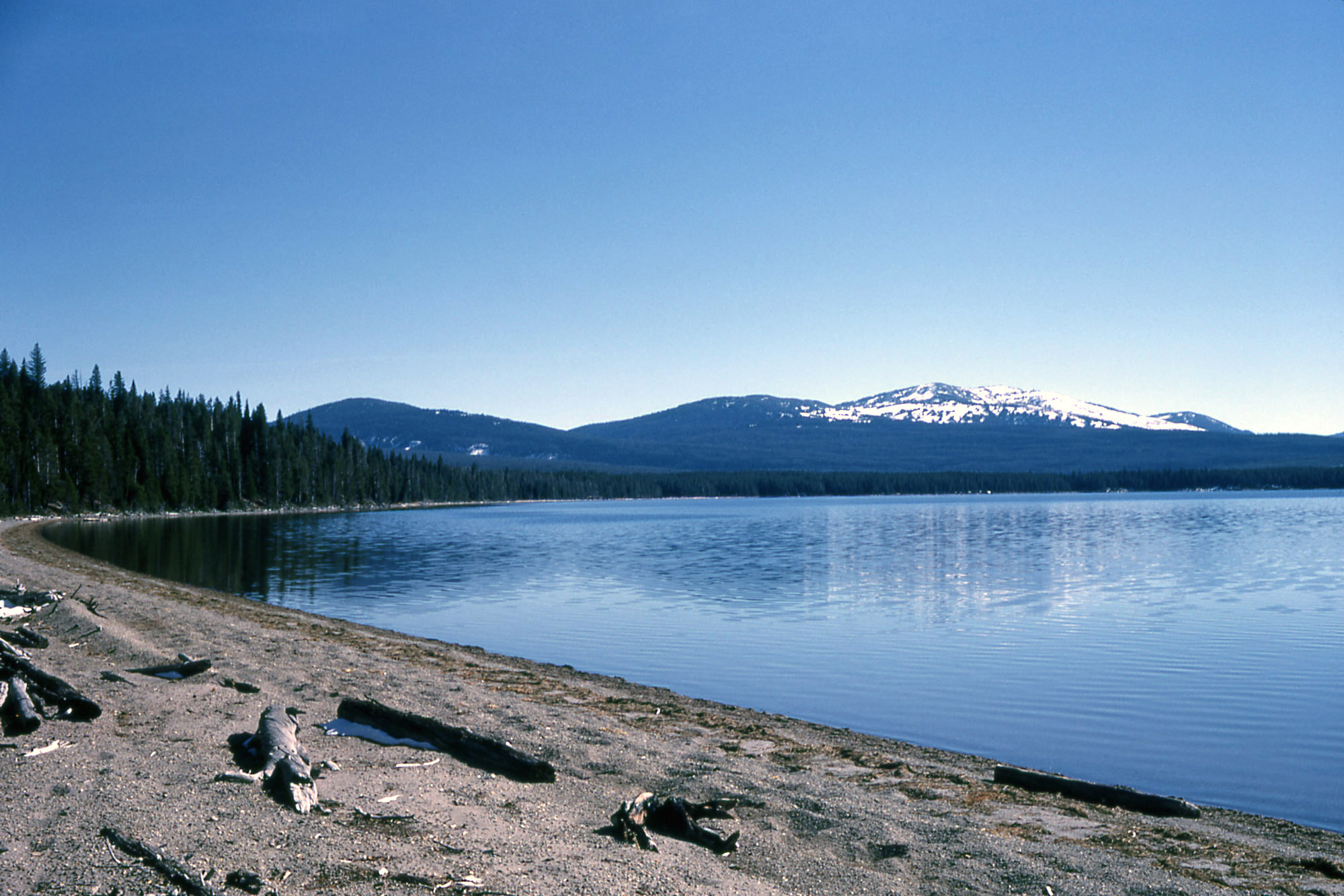
- Heart Lake, 1962

- Location within Wyoming Location within the United States
- Location: Yellowstone National Park, Teton County, Wyoming, US
- Coordinates: 44°16′04″N 110°29′20″W
- Primary outflows: Heart River
- Surface elevation: 7,461 feet (2,274 m)

Heart Lake el. 7,461 feet (2,274 m) is a large backcountry lake, nestled at the base of Mount Sheridan in Yellowstone National Park. Heart Lake is in the Snake River drainage and is drained by the Heart River.

== History ==
Heart Lake was apparently named sometime prior to 1871 for a local 1840s hunter, Hart Hunney, a fact that was later verified by Hiram Chittenden. In 1871, Captain John W. Barlow thought the name was Heart Lake because of it shape and the name became its official name. During the Arnold Hague Geologic Surveys, Chittenden petitioned Hague to change the name back to Hart, but Hague thought that Heart Lake was named because of the lake's shape and refused to change it. In 1870 a member of the Washburn-Langford-Doane Expedition, the solitary explorer Truman C. Everts, who had become separated from the rest of his party, probably camped on the shores of Heart Lake and named it Bessie Lake after his daughter.

== Heart Lake Geyser Basin ==
The Heart Lake Geyser Basin begins a couple miles from the lake and descends along Witch Creek to the lakeshore. Five groups of hydrothermal features comprise the basin, and all of them contain geysers, although some are dormant.

== Angling Heart Lake ==
Heart Lake holds Yellowstone cutthroat trout, lake trout, and mountain whitefish. Lake Trout were introduced in the 1890s. Angling is restricted to fly fishing or artificial lures. All cutthroat trout and whitefish must be released. There is no limit on the number of lake trout harvested. The park record lake trout, 42 pounds (19 kg) was caught in Heart Lake.

Heart Lake is 7.5 miles (12.1 km) from the south entrance road at Lewis Lake via the Heart Lake trail. Heart Lake can also be reached via the Trail Creek trail that traverses the southern shoreline of Yellowstone Lake or via the Heart River trail/Snake River trail from the park's southern border.

Heart Lake is within the Heart Lake Bear Management Area and access to the area is closed between April 1 and June 1 annually.

Images of Heart Lake

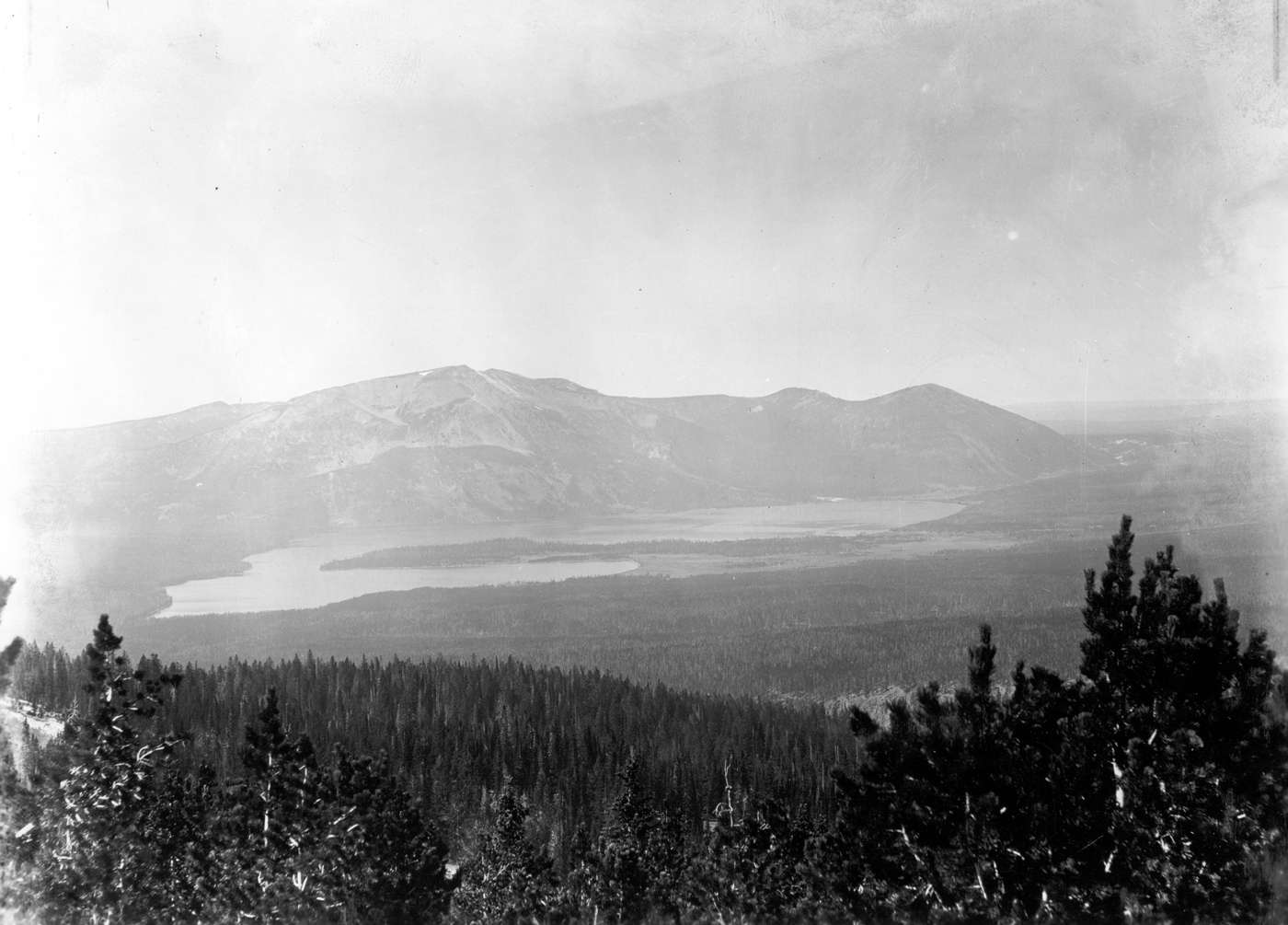
Heart Lake and Mount Sheridan, ca1890

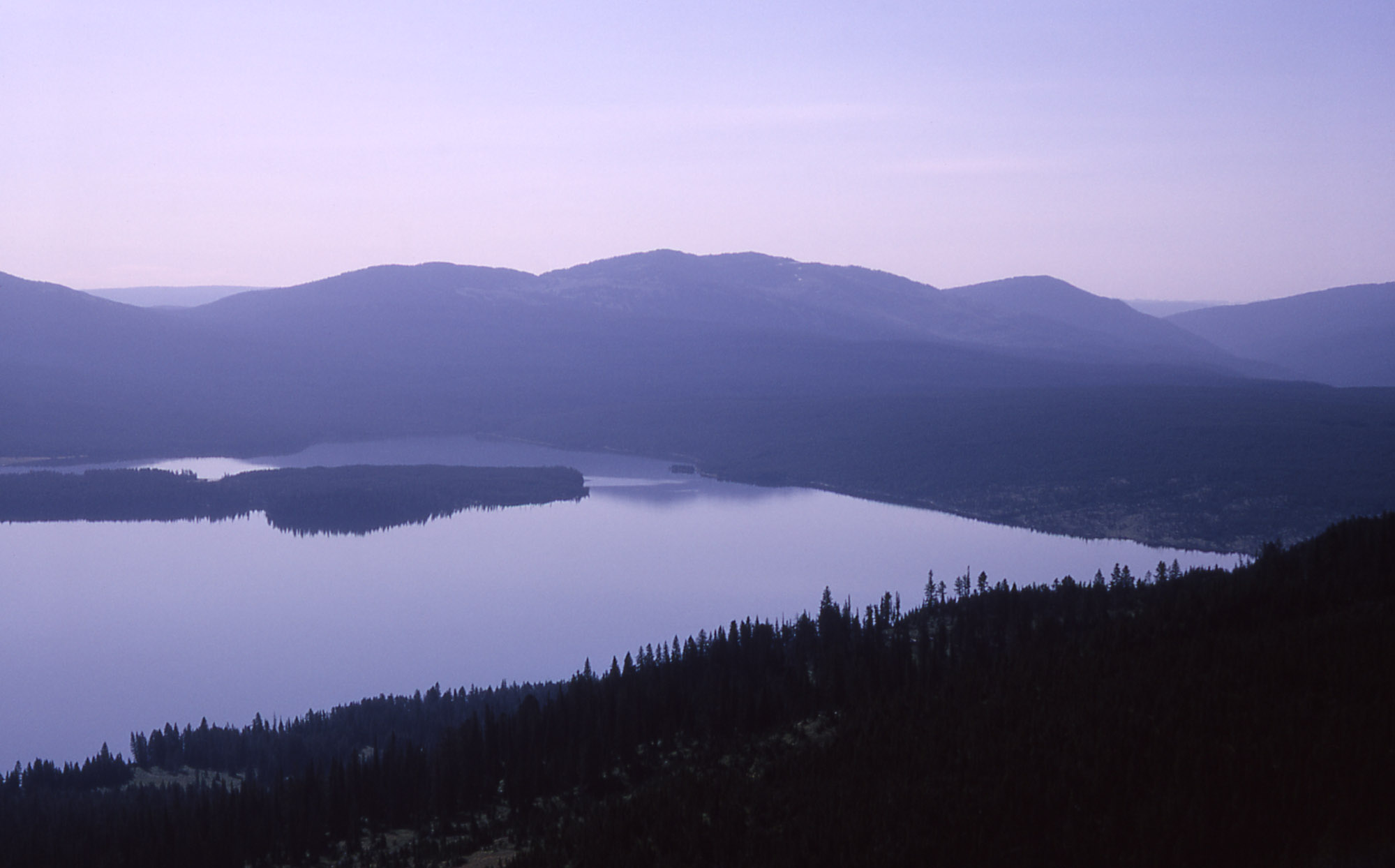
Heart Lake from Mount Sheridan, 1965

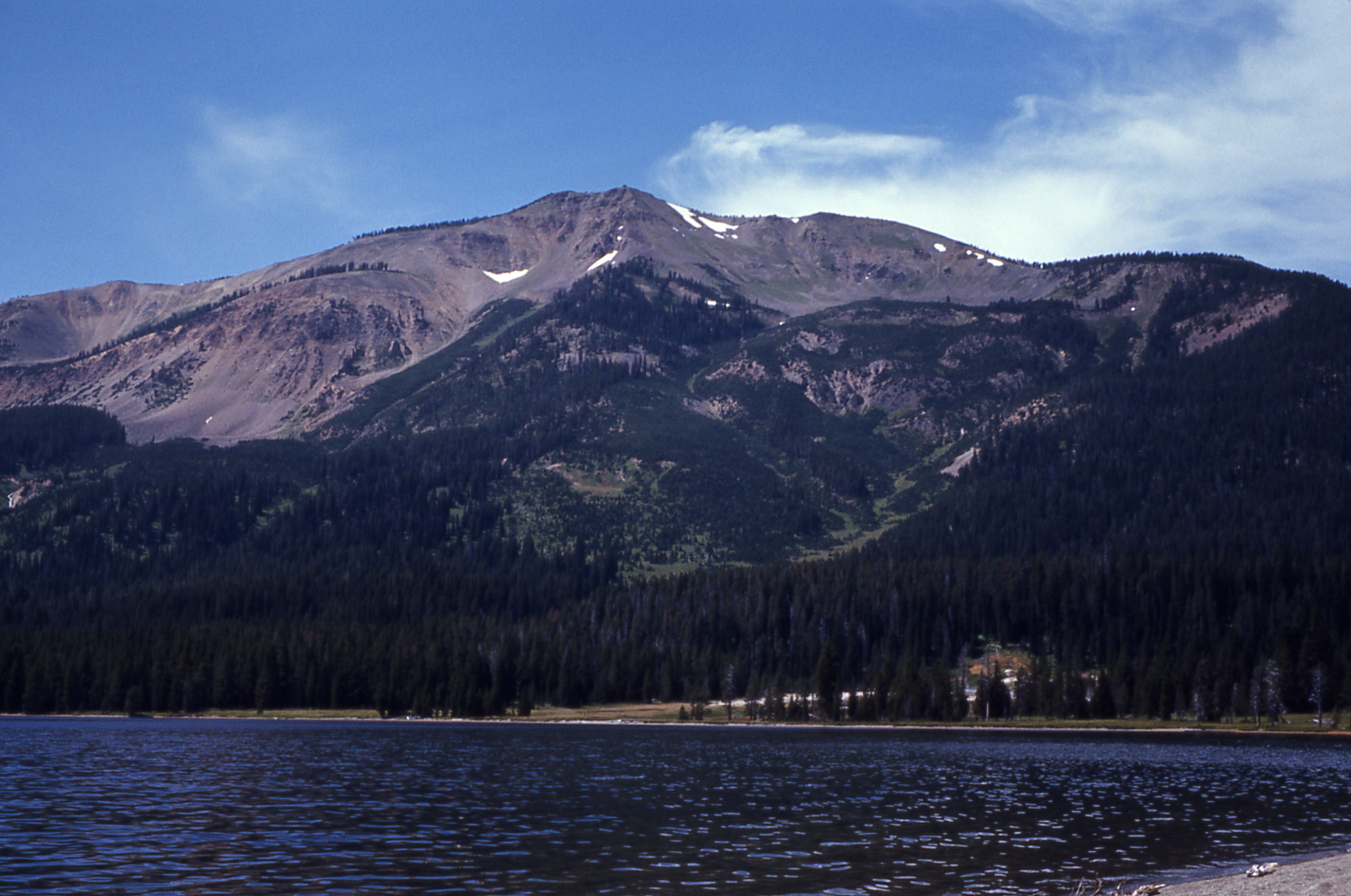
Mount Sheridan from Heart Lake, 1968

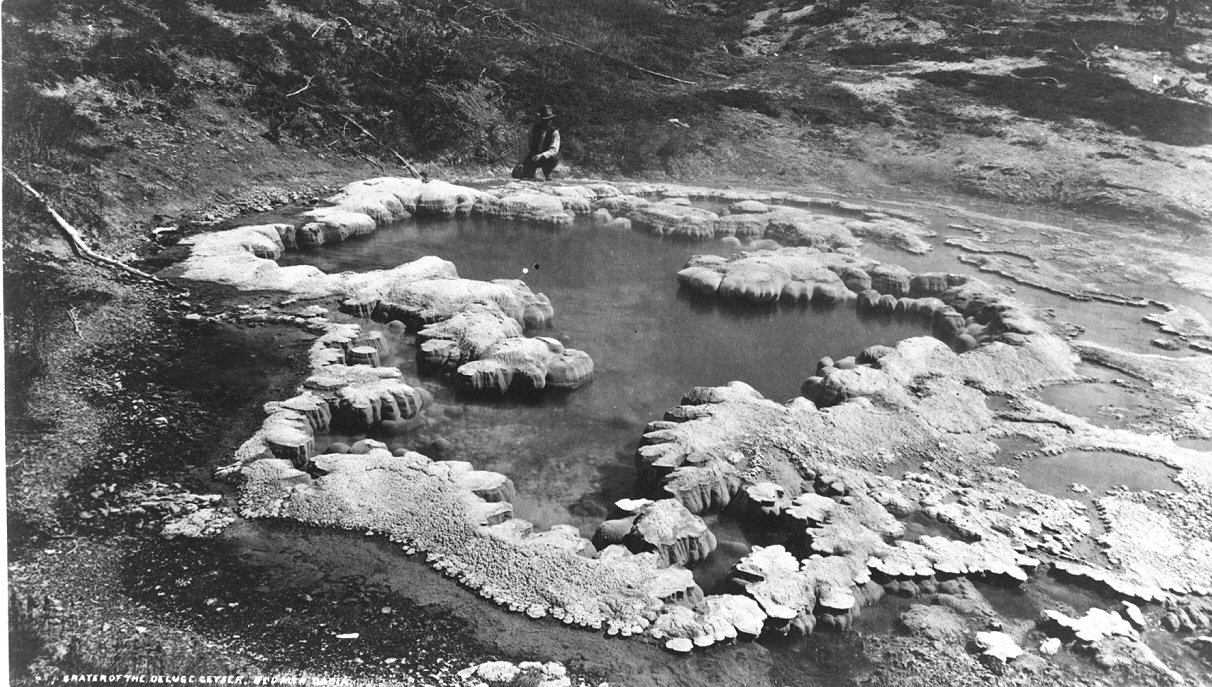
Deluge Geyser, Heart Lake Geyser Basin, 1872 William Henry Jackson

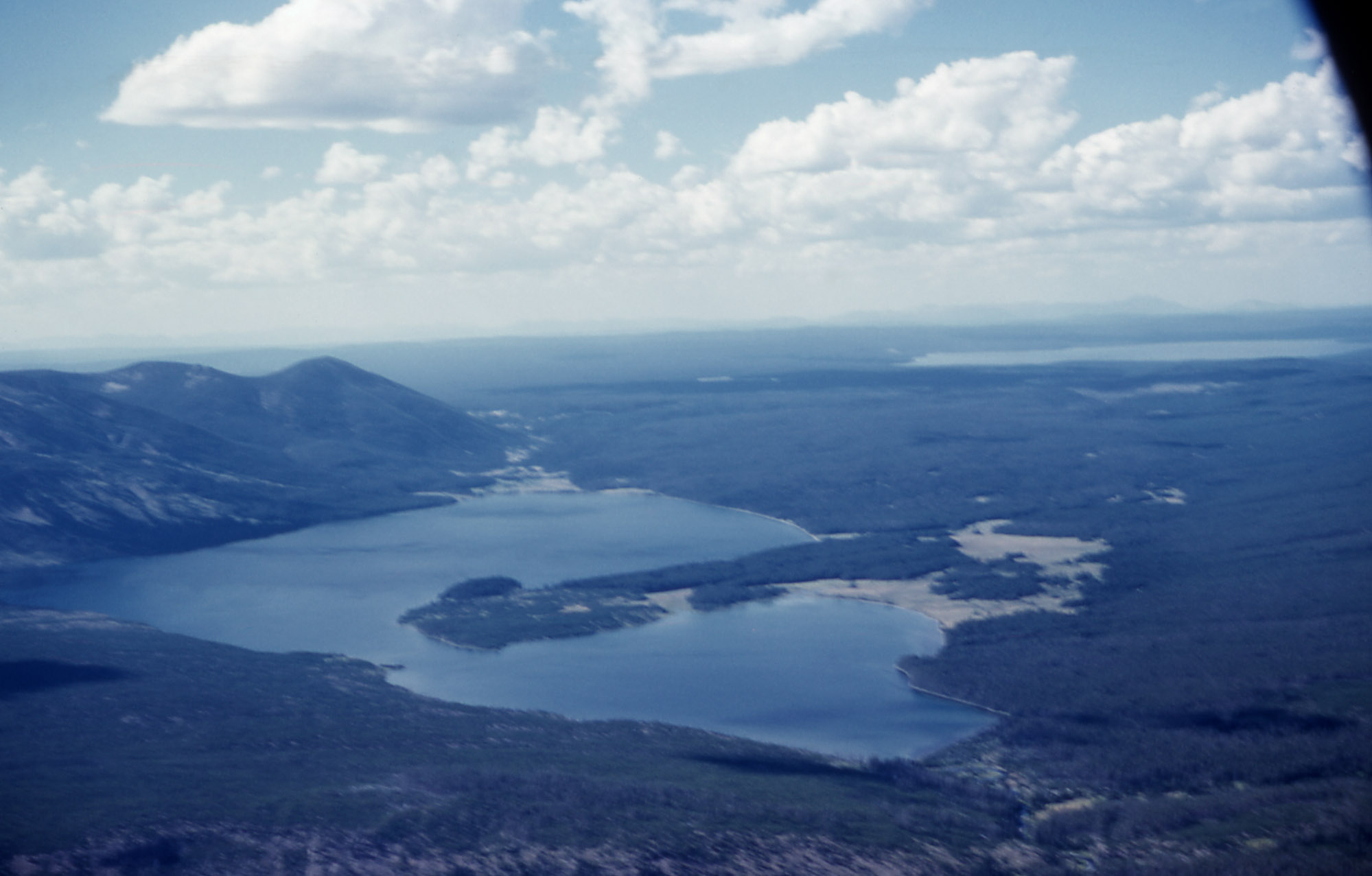

== See also ==
- Angling in Yellowstone National Park
- Fishes of Yellowstone National Park
