= Mount Sheridan =

Mountain in Wyoming, United States

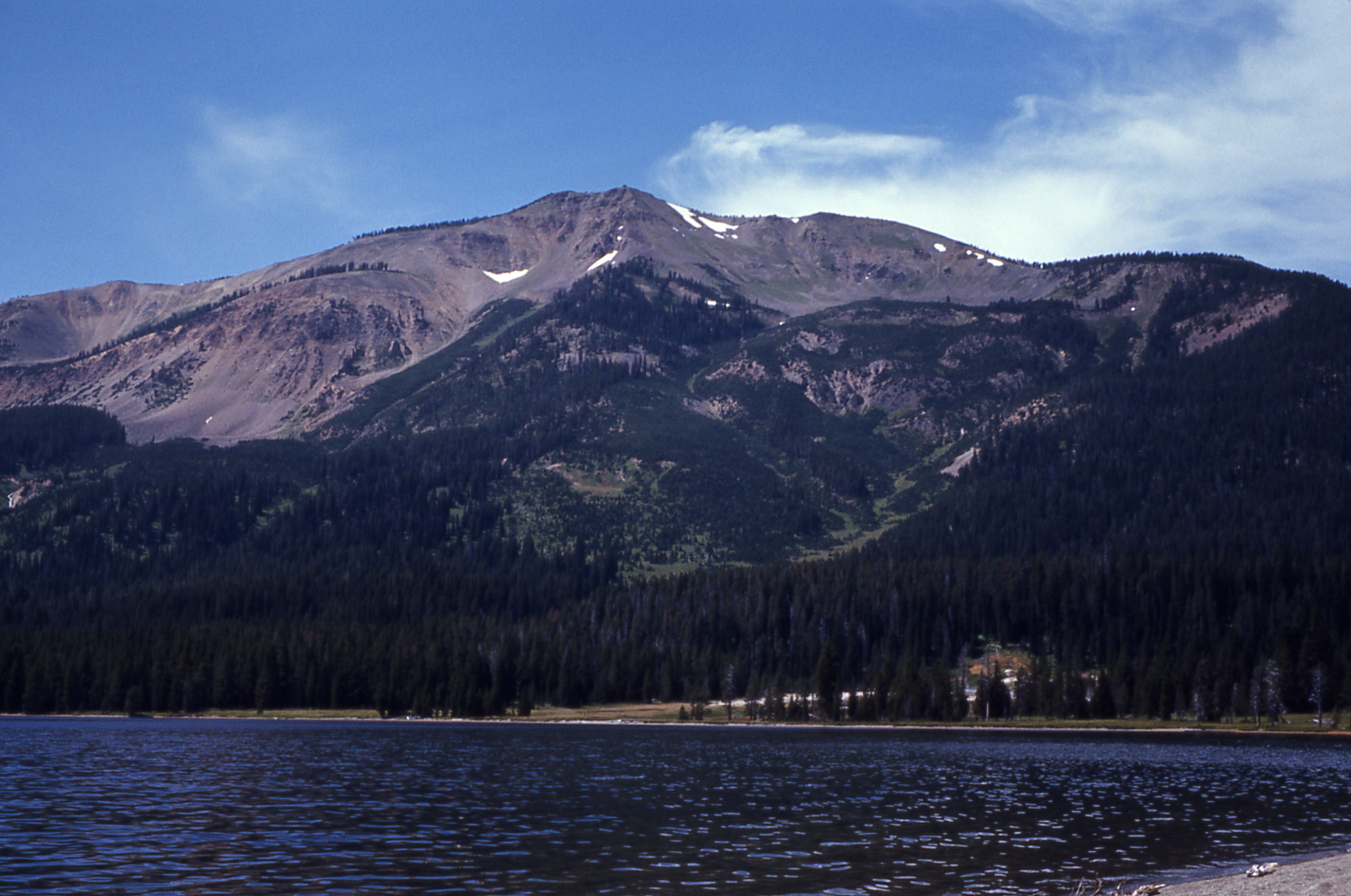
- Mount Sheridan from Heart Lake

Highest point
- Elevation: 10,313 ft (3,143 m)
- Prominence: 2,308 ft (703 m)
- Coordinates: 44°15′58″N 110°31′46″W

Geography
- Location within Wyoming
- Location: Yellowstone National Park, Teton County, Wyoming, U.S.
- Parent range: Red Mountains
- Topo map: Shoshone

Mount Sheridan, elevation 10,313 feet (3,143 m), is a prominent mountain peak overlooking Heart Lake in the Red Mountains of Yellowstone National Park. The peak is named in honor of General Philip H. Sheridan, U.S. Army, one of the early protectors of the park.

== History ==
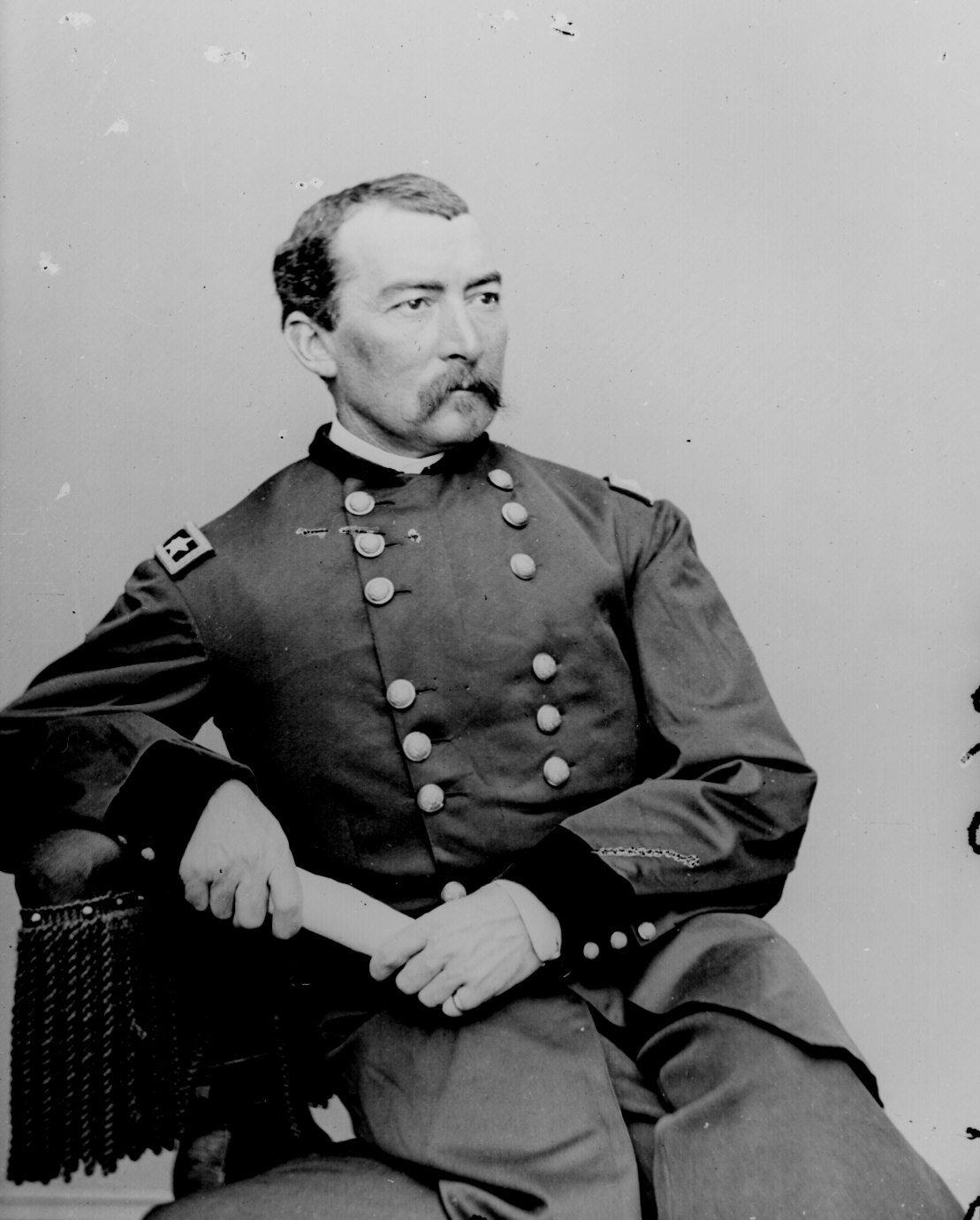
Mount Sheridan namesake, Philip Sheridan

Members of the Washburn–Langford–Doane Expedition in 1870 gave this mountain the name of Brown Mountain, while Lt. Gustavus C. Doane, also a member of the expedition named the mountain Yellow Mountain. In 1871 during the Hayden Geological Survey of 1871 Ferdinand Vandeveer Hayden named the peak Red Mountain. Also in 1871, Captain John W. Barlow, a military member of the Hayden expedition ascended the peak on August 10, 1871 and named it Mount Sheridan to honor the general. Years later the name Red Mountain was given to the entire range in which Mount Sheridan sits.

Opposite the head of this arm [South Arm of Yellowstone Lake] is the great yellow mountain seen from Mount Langford several days ago. This is the central point from which radiate double barriers, separating the waters of the Yellowstone from the Snake, and the latter from the Madison, Snake River flowing on the east side of the mountain southerly, and the Firehole branch of the Madison rising in a small lake to the west of the range, the main branch coming from Henry's Lake, south of this. This mountain may be said to be the focus of volcanic action in the basin, the greatest phenomena being observed within a radius of thirty miles from its summit. From its yellow, sulphureted appearance it can be readily distinguished, and is the central and most important landmark in the great basin.

— Gustavus C. Doane, September 11, 1870

== Mount Sheridan Trail ==
The summit can be reached via the Mount Sheridan Trail 3.9 miles (6.3 km) which spurs off the Heart Lake Trail at the northwest corner of Heart Lake. This is a steep climb of 3,000 feet (910 m) in 3 miles (4.8 km), but provides extraordinary views of the park in all directions and the Teton Range to the southwest.

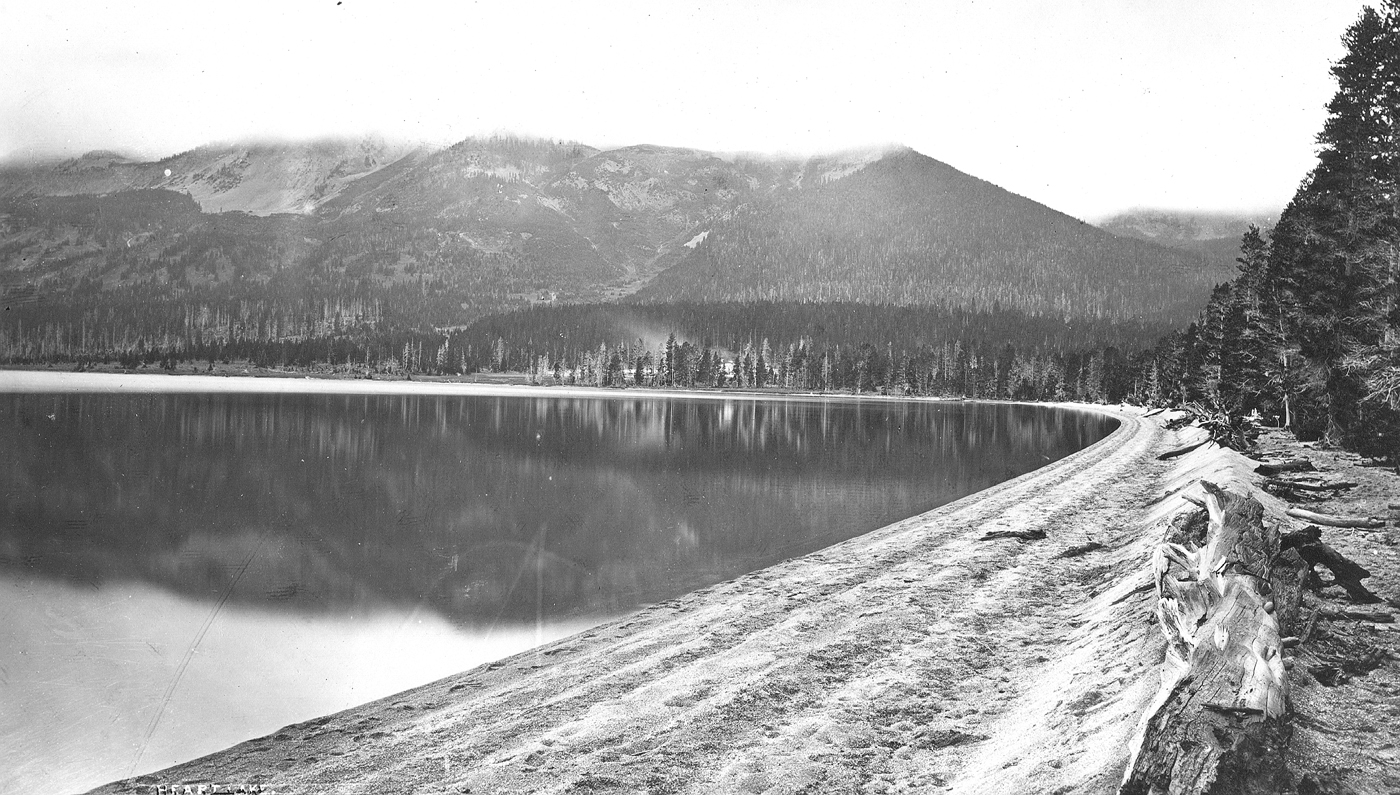
Heart Lake and Mountain Sheridan, 1878, William Henry Jackson

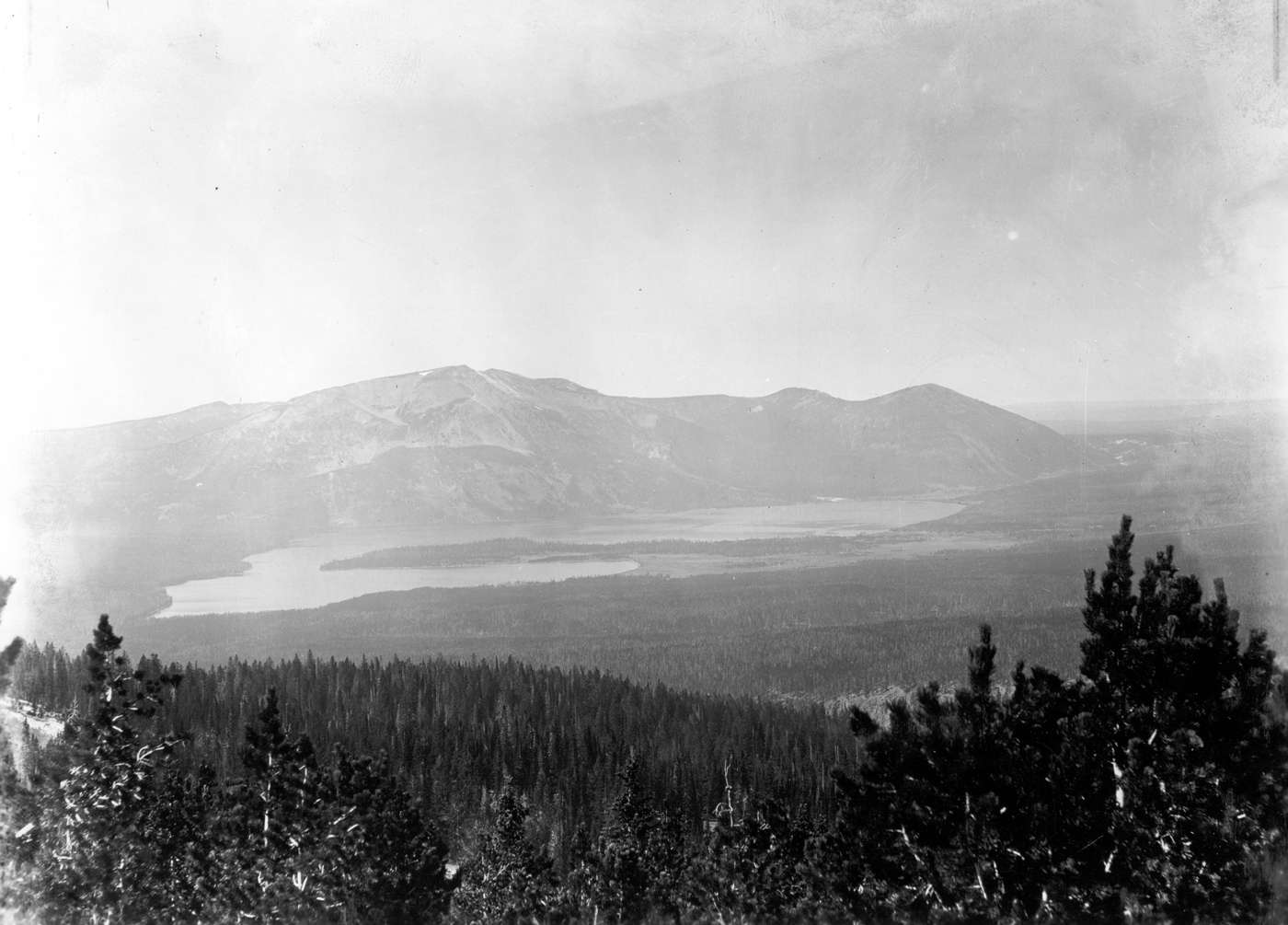
Heart Lake and Mount Sheridan, ca1890

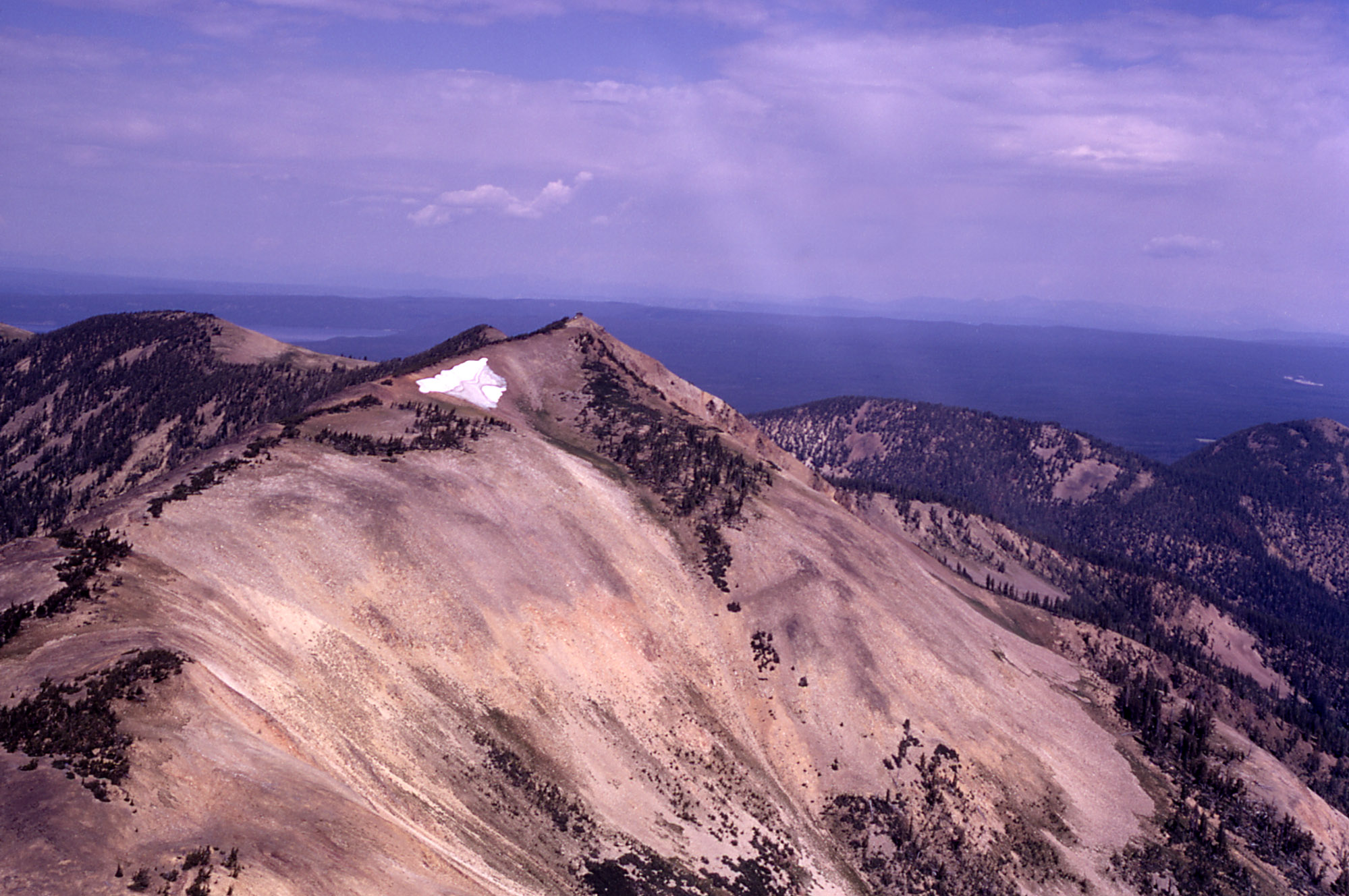
Mount Sheridan from the southeast, 1973

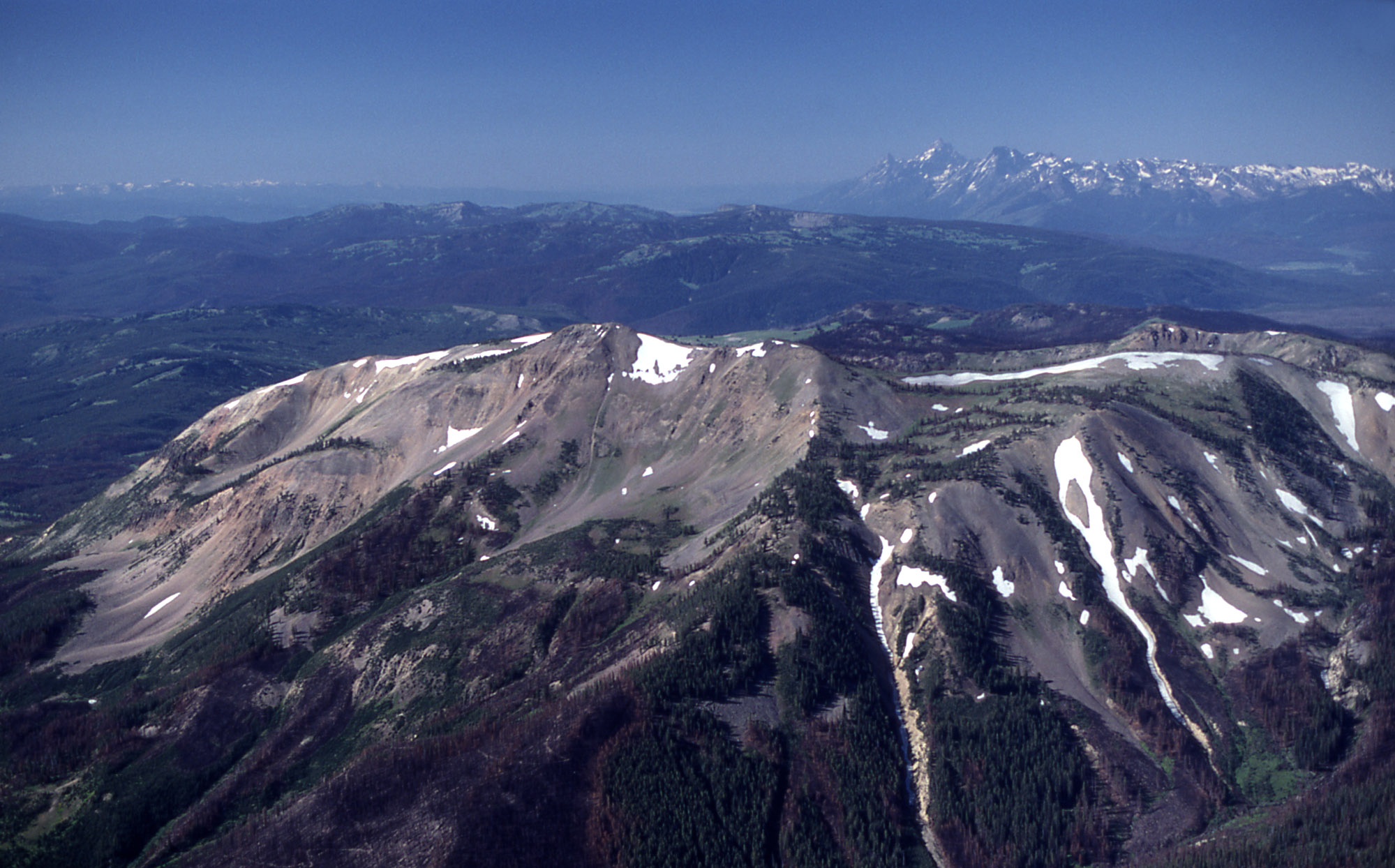
Mount Sheridan and Tetons, 1989

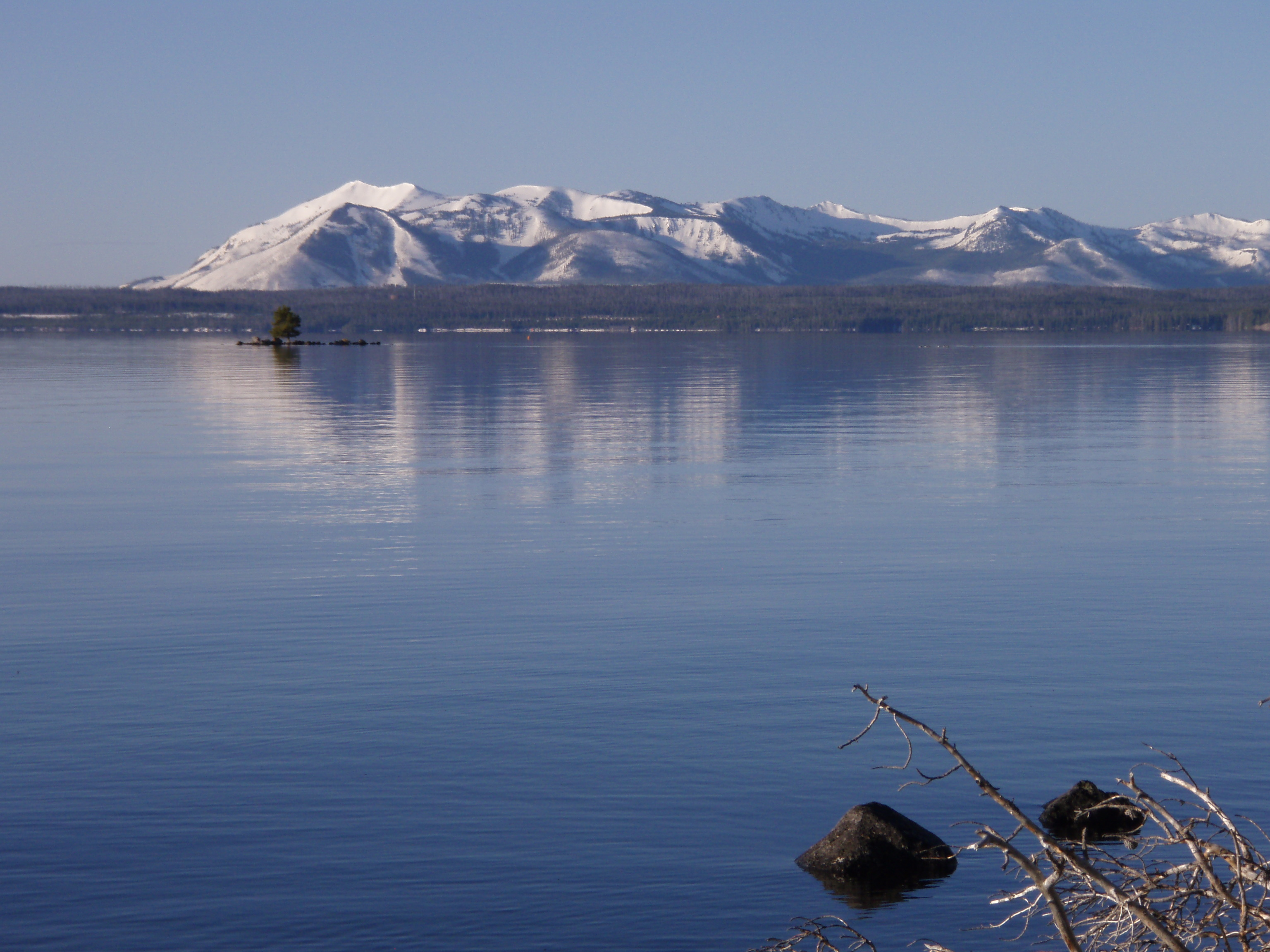
From West Thumb, Yellowstone Lake, June 2011

== See also ==
- List of mountains and mountain ranges of Yellowstone National Park
