= Canby, Oregon =

Canby
- City
- Canby, Oregon
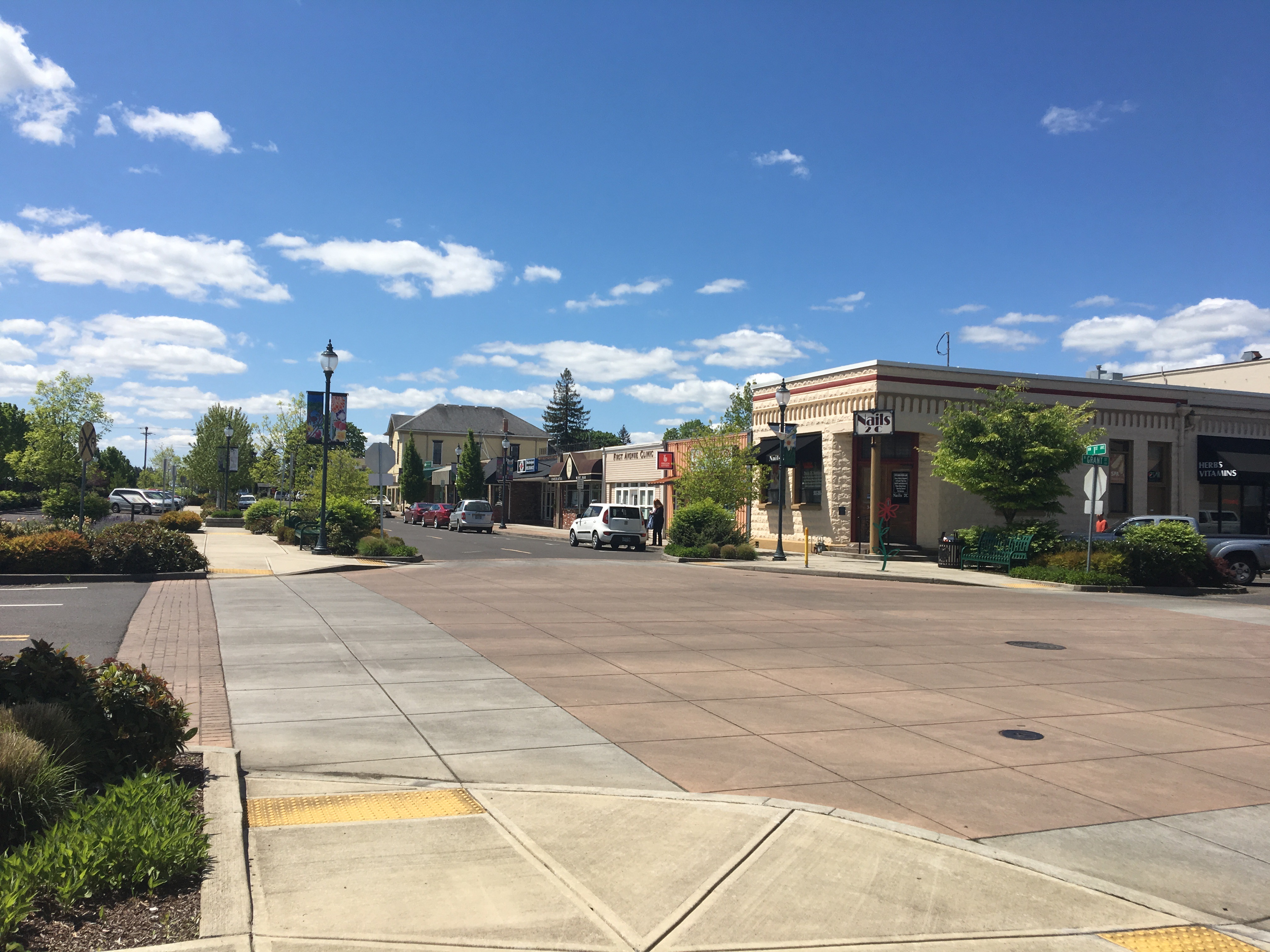
- Shops in downtown Canby

- Seal
- Nickname: Oregon's Garden Spot
- Motto: Home of the Good Earth
- Location in Oregon
- Coordinates: 45°15′55″N 122°41′12″W
- Country: United States
- State: Oregon
- County: Clackamas
- Incorporated: 1893

Government
  - Mayor: Brian Hodson

Area
  - Total: 4.73 sq mi (12.26 km^{2})
  - Land: 4.70 sq mi (12.17 km^{2})
  - Water: 0.035 sq mi (0.09 km^{2})
- Elevation: 148 ft (45 m)

Population (2020)
  - Total: 18,171
  - Density: 3,868/sq mi (1,493.5/km^{2})
- Time zone: UTC−8 (Pacific)
  - Summer (DST): UTC−7 (Pacific)
- ZIP code: 97013
- Area code: 503 971
- FIPS code: 41-10750
- GNIS feature ID: 2409974
- Website: City of Canby

Canby is a city in Clackamas County, Oregon, United States. The population was 18,171 at the 2020 census. It is along Oregon Route 99E, 2 miles (3 km) northeast of Barlow.

== History ==
Canby is named for Edward Richard Sprigg Canby, a Civil War general who was later killed in the Modoc War by Captain Jack and his group of warriors.

The area was known as Baker Prairie when the community was founded in 1857. Canby was platted in 1870. Canby was incorporated by the Oregon Legislative Assembly on February 15, 1893.

In May 2016, Canby was featured on the ABC newsmagazine 20/20, when the local "Canby Psychic" was part of an investigation into the swindling of a local rancher out of $15 million.

== Geography ==
According to the United States Census Bureau, the city has a total area of 3.79 square miles (9.82 km^{2}), of which 3.75 square miles (9.71 km^{2}) is land and 0.04 square miles (0.10 km^{2}) is water.

Entering Canby from the north brings visitors past the Willamette River, and from the south through the historic community of Aurora. The Molalla River passes by the southern and western border of the city.

=== Climate ===
This region experiences warm and dry summers, with no average monthly temperatures above 71.6 °F (22.0 °C). According to the Köppen Climate Classification system, Canby has a warm-summer Mediterranean climate, abbreviated "Csb" on climate maps.

== Demographics ==
Historical population
Census	Pop.	Note	%±
1880	29		—
1900	378		—
1910	587		55.3%
1920	852		45.1%
1930	744		−12.7%
1940	988		32.8%
1950	1,671		69.1%
1960	2,168		29.7%
1970	3,813		75.9%
1980	7,659		100.9%
1990	8,983		17.3%
2000	12,790		42.4%
2010	15,829		23.8%
2020	18,171		14.8%

=== 2020 census ===
As of the 2020 census, Canby had a population of 18,171. The median age was 39.7 years, with 23.5% of residents under the age of 18 and 19.1% of residents 65 years of age or older. For every 100 females there were 93.4 males, and for every 100 females age 18 and over there were 90.8 males age 18 and over. The average household size was 2.73 people and the population density was 3,867.82 inhabitants per square mile (1,493.37/km^{2}).

There were 6,642 households in Canby, of which 33.3% had children under the age of 18 living in them. Of all households, 55.7% were married-couple households, 13.7% were households with a male householder and no spouse or partner present, and 24.5% were households with a female householder and no spouse or partner present. About 22.2% of all households were made up of individuals and 13.0% had someone living alone who was 65 years of age or older.

There were 6,826 housing units, of which 2.7% were vacant. Among occupied housing units, 66.8% were owner-occupied and 33.2% were renter-occupied. The homeowner vacancy rate was 0.8% and the rental vacancy rate was 2.6%.

100.0% of residents lived in urban areas, while <0.1% lived in rural areas.

Racial composition as of the 2020 census
Race	Number	Percent
White	13,448	74.0%
Black or African American	79	0.4%
American Indian and Alaska Native	193	1.1%
Asian	235	1.3%
Native Hawaiian and Other Pacific Islander	24	0.1%
Some other race	1,804	9.9%
Two or more races	2,388	13.1%
Hispanic or Latino (of any race)	3,866	21.3%

=== 2010 census ===
As of the census of 2010, there were 15,829 people, 5,647 households, and 4,129 families living in the city. The population density was 4,221.1 inhabitants per square mile (1,629.8/km^{2}). There were 5,890 housing units at an average density of 1,570.7 per square mile (606.5/km^{2}). The racial makeup of the city was 81.0% White, 0.6% African American, 1.2% Native American, 1.1% Asian, 0.2% Pacific Islander, 13.1% from other races, and 2.9% from two or more races. Hispanic or Latino of any race were 21.3% of the population.

There were 5,647 households, of which 39.5% had children under the age of 18 living with them, 57.4% were married couples living together, 11.1% had a female householder with no husband present, 4.6% had a male householder with no wife present, and 26.9% were non-families. 22.3% of all households were made up of individuals, and 12.9% had someone living alone who was 65 years of age or older. The average household size was 2.79 and the average family size was 3.27.

The median age in the city was 36.3 years. 28.3% of residents were under the age of 18; 7.9% were between the ages of 18 and 24; 25.5% were from 25 to 44; 24% were from 45 to 64; and 14.2% were 65 years of age or older. The gender makeup of the city was 48.0% male and 52.0% female.

=== 2000 census ===
As of the census of 2000, there were 12,790 people, 4,489 households, and 3,366 families living in the city. The population density was 3,390.0 inhabitants per square mile (1,308.9/km^{2}). There were 4,743 housing units at an average density of 1,257.1 per square mile (485.4/km^{2}). The racial makeup of the city was 88.42% White, 0.47% African American, 0.77% Native American, 1.00% Asian, 0.13% Pacific Islander, 7.47% from other races, and 1.74% from two or more races. Hispanic or Latino of any race were 15.52% of the population.

There were 4,489 households, out of which 40.6% had children under the age of 18 living with them, 60.3% were married couples living together, 10.4% had a female householder with no husband present, and 25.0% were non-families. Households made up of individuals represented 21.2% of all households, and 11.0% of all households had someone living alone who was 65 years of age or older. The average household size was 2.83 and the average family size was 3.27.

In the city, the population was spread out, with 30.6% under the age of 18, 8.5% from 18 to 24, 29.7% from 25 to 44, 19.7% from 45 to 64, and 11.6% who were 65 years of age or older. The median age was 33 years. For every 100 females, there were 95.1 males. For every 100 females age 18 and over, there were 91.4 males.

The median income for a household in the city was $45,811, and the median income for a family was $49,690. Males had a median income of $42,145 versus $28,775 for females. The per capita income for the city was $19,322. About 6.0% of families and 7.4% of the population were below the poverty line, including 9.3% of those under age 18 and 5.7% of those age 65 or over.

== Arts and culture ==
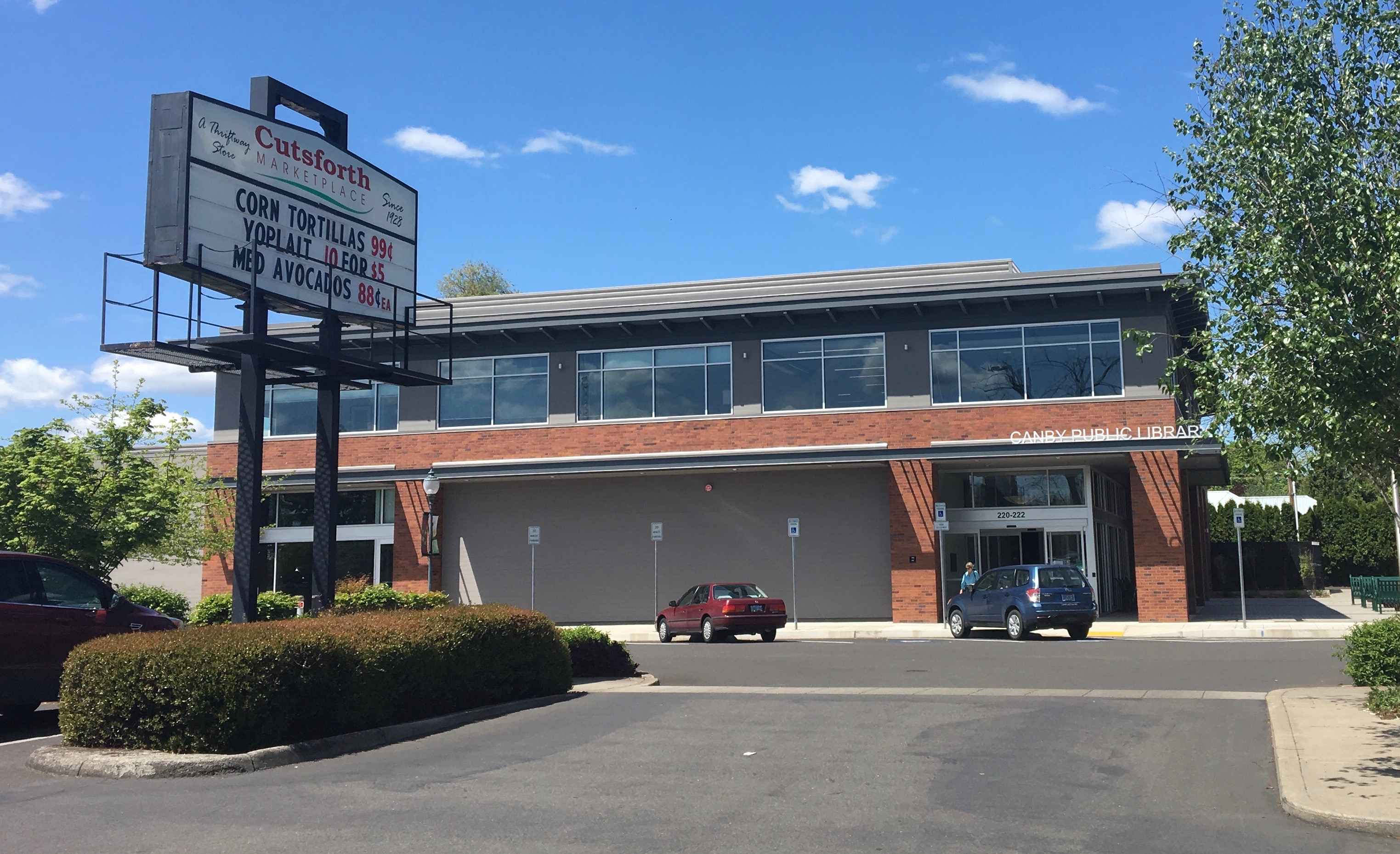
Canby Public Library and advert for Cutsforth's Market

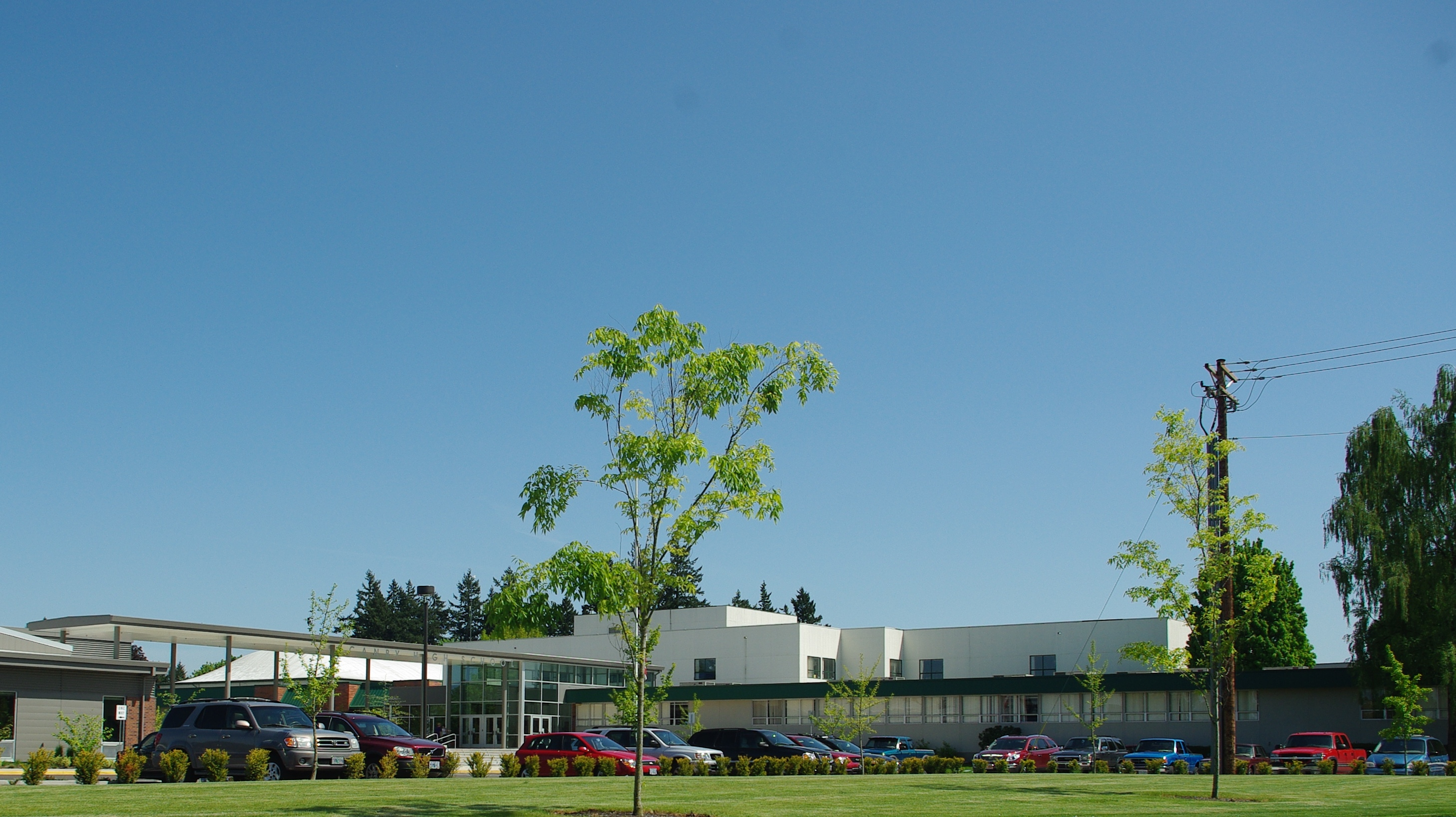
Canby High School

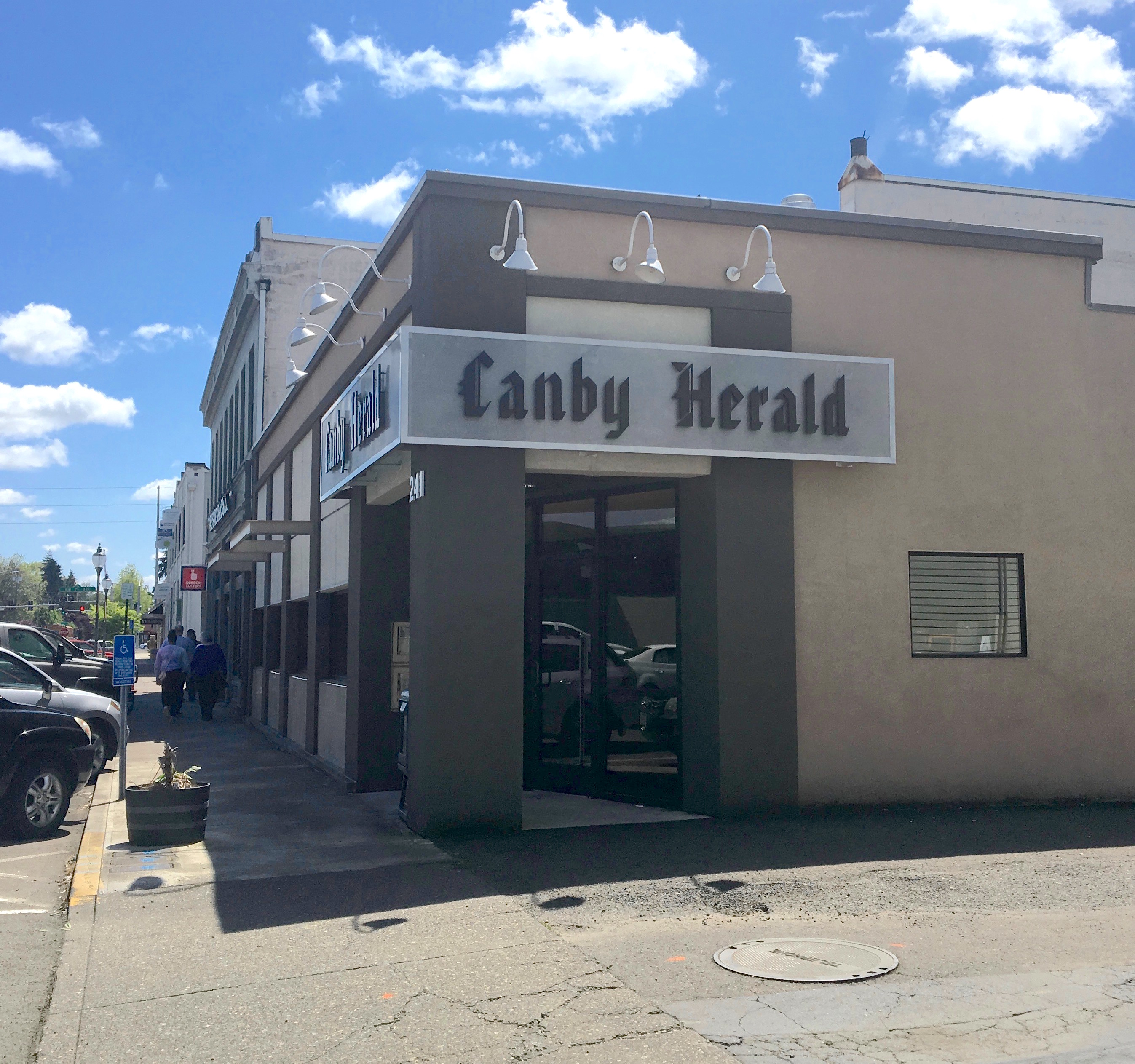
Canby Herald office

The city's library is part of the Library Information Network of Clackamas County.

Canby is the home of the Clackamas County Fairgrounds, where the annual Clackamas County Fair and Rodeo has been held since 1907. The fairgrounds, located north of Oregon Route 99E, are used in August for the fair and year-round for other events.

Canby is home to the Canby Depot Museum and Hart's Reptile World.

== Education ==
Canby students are served by the Canby School District, which includes Canby High School.

== Media ==
The Herald-Pioneer is the city's weekly newspaper. It was previously named the Canby Herald, and had covered the city and published under that title for nearly 100 years, since 1922, until merging in 2020 with the Molalla Pioneer, a jointly owned newspaper focused on nearby Molalla, Oregon. As of September 2018, Canby is also served by The Canby Current, a digital news source and twice-weekly podcast formerly known as the Canby Now Podcast.

== Transportation ==
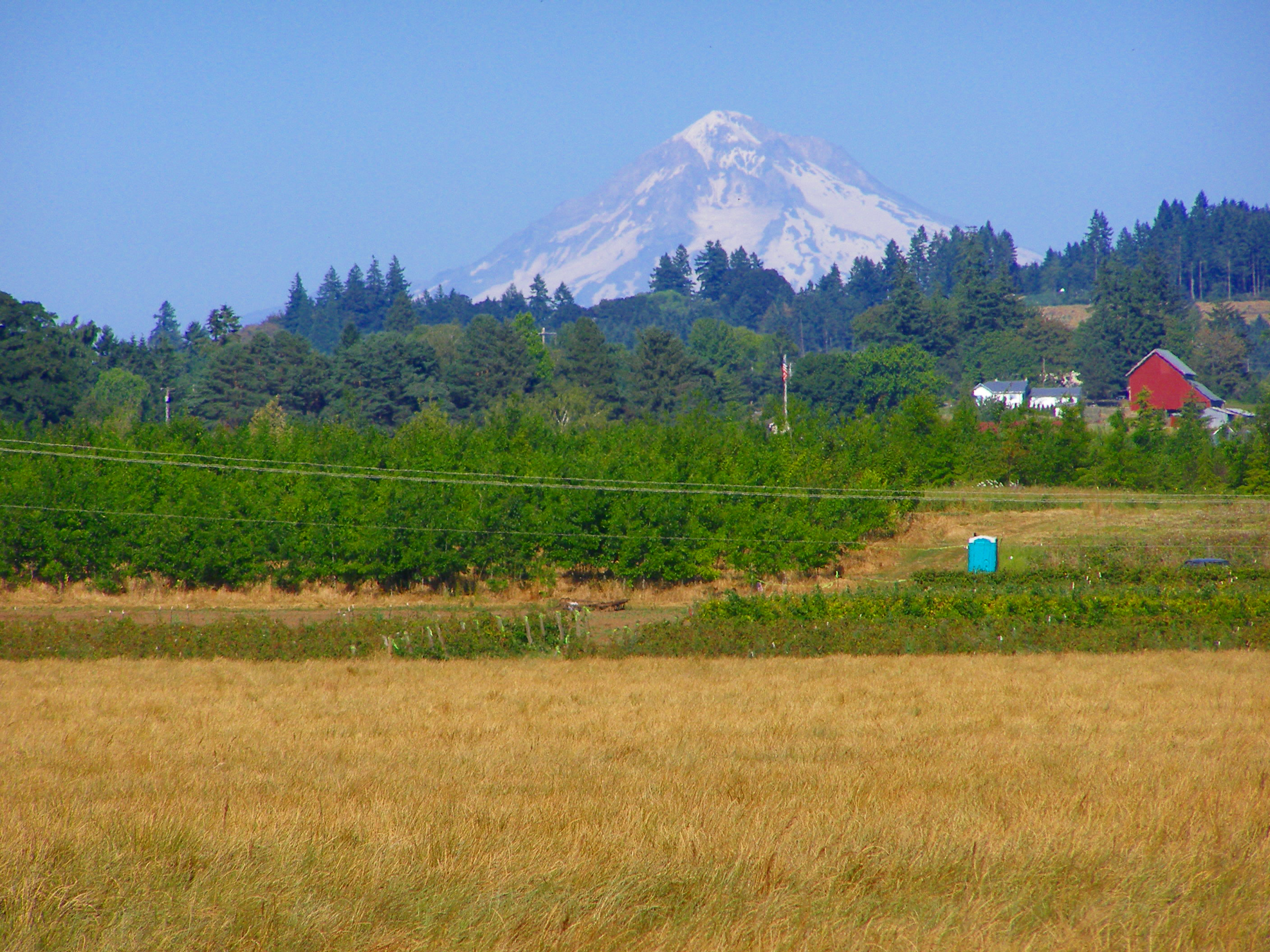
Mount Hood, as seen from the Molalla Forest Road in Canby, between Southeast 13th St. and Southeast Township Road

=== Rail ===
The Union Pacific (formerly a Southern Pacific mainline) freight and passenger (via Amtrak) line runs through the center of downtown Canby although Amtrak passenger trains no longer stop here. The Amtrak Cascades stops in nearby Oregon City. The Oregon Pacific Railroad branchline to Molalla interchanges with the Union Pacific mainline at Canby.

=== Mass transit ===
Since 2002, the city has operated its own bus system, Canby Area Transit (CAT). CAT buses do not run on weekends or major holidays. The service connects with the Portland area's TriMet at the Oregon City Transit Center and with the Salem-Keizer Transit (Cherriots) bus system in Woodburn. Canby is also served by one route of South Metro Area Regional Transit (SMART), the bus division of the City of Wilsonville. Prior to 2002, Canby was included within the TriMet district, and that agency was the sole provider of transit service in Canby. In late 2001, TriMet approved a request by Canby to withdraw from the TriMet district and initiate its own transit service.

=== Automobile ===
Oregon Route 99E, a north–south highway, runs generally east–west within the city, paralleling the Union Pacific mainline. The Union Pacific mainline and Ivy St. form a cross that divides the city into four quadrants: NW, NE, SE and SW.

The east–west streets are generally numbered avenues, with Oregon Route 99E being SE and SW 1st Avenue. North–south streets are named streets. Many of their names are types of trees, and they run in alphabetical order from west to east, starting at the Molalla River. Within the city limits, addresses always include a quadrant designation, except for Ivy St, which only includes N or S.

Unincorporated islands within the city limits are included in the addressing system, as are some adjacent areas, but most unincorporated areas around the city but still in Clackamas County conform to the Portland addressing scheme, while areas in Marion County conform to the Salem addressing scheme.

=== Waterways ===
The historic Canby Ferry provides year-round transportation across the Willamette River (river conditions permitting) between Canby and Wilsonville.

=== Aviation ===
Canby is close to the Aurora State Airport and the Portland-Mulino Airport, both of which are served by general aviation only.

=== Pedestrian and bicycle ===
Canby features a paved road which is closed to automobile traffic, the Molalla Forest Road. This road was formerly a private road used by logging trucks, but is now used primarily by bicyclists and pedestrians.

== Notable people ==
- Jay Baller, baseball player for the Orix Buffaloes
- Howard C. Belton, Oregon State Treasurer
- Ed Coleman, baseball player for the St Louis Browns
- Ralph Coleman, baseball coach for the Oregon State Beavers
- McKayla Fricker, middle-distance runner
- Tom Gorman, baseball pitcher for the San Diego Padres
- Joni Harms, country musician
- Bill Morgan, football player for the New York Giants
- Alan Olsen, Oregon State Senator
- Ralph Patt (1929–2010), the jazz-guitarist who introduced major-thirds tuning, Griewank (2010) and also a geologist who consulted on groundwater contamination at the Hanford Site.
- Kurt Schrader, U.S. Representative from Oregon
- Martha Schrader, Oregon State Senator
- Aaron E. Waite, Oregon Supreme Court justice
- Jana Schmieding, Comedian, Actor, Podcaster, and Writer

== Sister city ==
- Kurisawa, Hokkaido, Japan (since 1987)
