= Hart Island (disambiguation) =

Hart Island may refer to:

== Islands ==
- Hart Island (Maryland), Chesapeake Bay, USA; an island now part of Hart-Miller Island
- Hart Island (Bronx), New York City, New York State, USA; an island in Long Island Sound formerly part of Westchester County
- Hart Island (Washington), in Skagit County, state of Washington, USA; an island on the Skagit River
- Hart Island (İzmir), in Aegean region, Republic of Turkey

== Other uses ==
- Hart Island (book) a 1998 book about the Bronx island by Melinda Hunt and Joel Sternfeld

== See also ==
- Heart Island, an island in the Saint Lawrence River in New York
