= HART =

HART may refer to:

== Transportation ==
- Hillsborough Area Regional Transit, Florida
- Honolulu Authority for Rapid Transportation, Hawaiʻi
- Housatonic Area Regional Transit, Connecticut
- Huntington Area Rapid Transit, Long Island, New York

== Response or rescue teams ==
- Hazardous area response team, UK
- High Acuity Response Team, a type of Rapid response team (medicine)

== Science and technology ==
- HART Communications Protocol (Highway Addressable Remote Transducer) - a communication protocol used in the process industries.
- Human Assisted Reproductive Technology
- Hypervelocity Aircraft Rocket, Tactical

== Other uses ==
- Halt All Racist Tours, New Zealand
- Health Advisory and Recovery Team, a British antivaccine pressure group
- Heterogeneous Aerial Reconnaissance Team
- Hillsboro Artists' Regional Theatre

== See also ==
- Highly active antiretroviral therapy (HAART), a treatment for HIV
- Hart (disambiguation)
