= Grayscale (band) =

American rock band

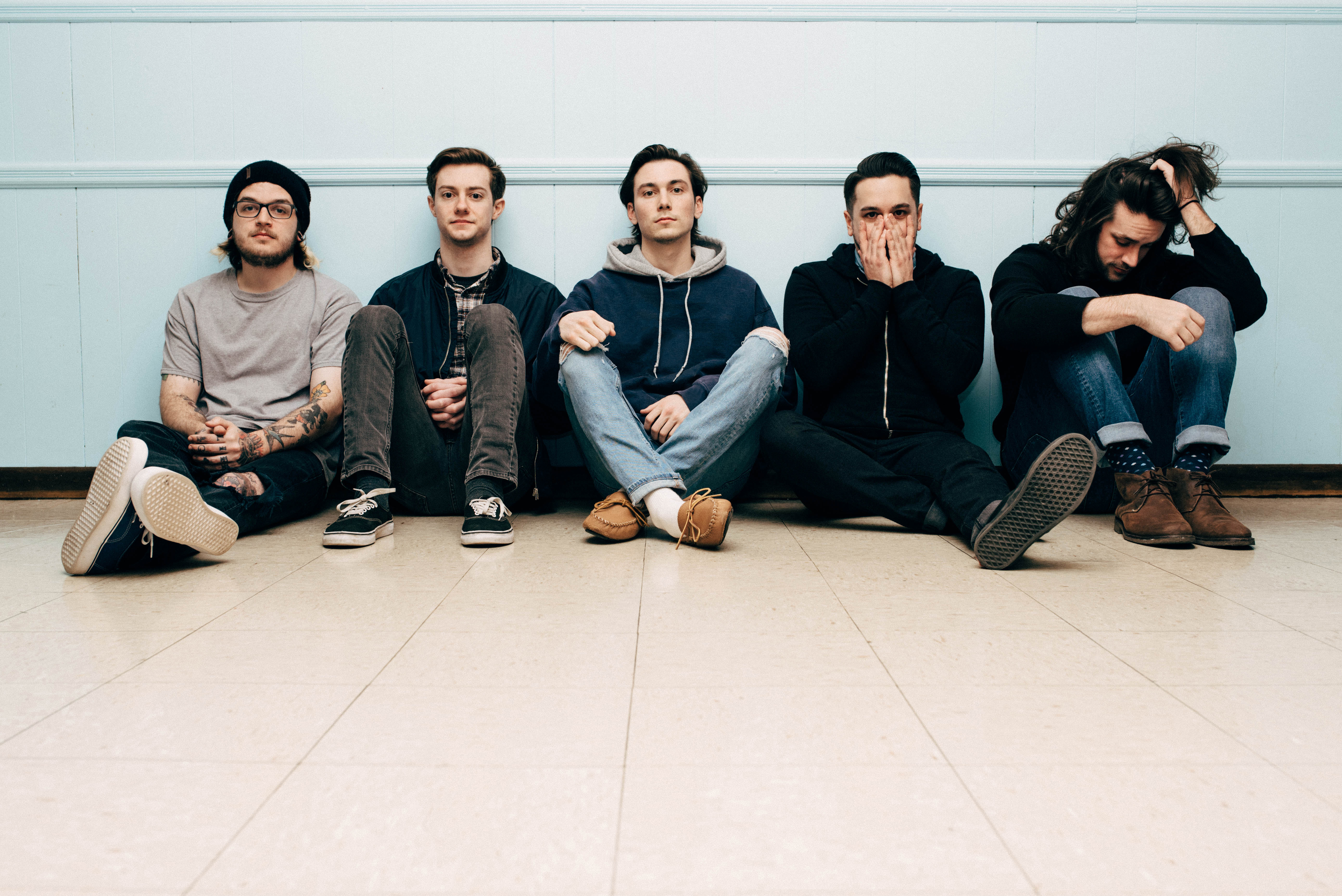
- Grayscale in 2017. From left to right: Dallas Molster, Nick Veno, Collin Walsh, Nick Ventimiglia, and Andrew Kyne

Background information
- Origin: Philadelphia, Pennsylvania, U.S.
- Genres: Pop punk; alternative rock
- Years active: 2011–present
- Label: Infield Records
- Members: Collin Walsh; Dallas Molster; Nick Veno; Andrew Kyne
- Past members: Derek Parker; Nick Ventimiglia; William Adair
- Website: grayscalepa.com

Grayscale are an American rock band from Philadelphia, Pennsylvania. Formed in 2011, the group features lead vocalist and guitarist Collin Walsh, lead guitarist and backing vocalist Andrew Kyne, rhythm guitarist and backing vocalist Dallas Molster, and drummer Nick Veno.

The band formed from the Philadelphia pop-punk scene, building a strong reputation and gaining steam among fans and music lovers. In April 2015, Grayscale released its first EP, Change. From 2017 to 2023, the band was signed to Fearless Records. They have released three studio albums through Fearless, Adornment (2017), Nella Vita (2019) and Umbra (2021), and a fourth independently, The Hart (2025).

== History ==
=== 2017–2018: Adornment ===
On March 30, 2017, it was announced that Grayscale signed to Fearless Records and released their first single off the label titled "Atlantic". It was released alongside a music video. On April 14, 2017, it was announced that Grayscale would be releasing their debut album, Adornment, via Fearless, which included their single "Atlantic". They also released another single off the album, "Beautiful Things", which was released the same day as the album announcement.

On June 1, 2017, it was announced that Grayscale would contribute a song to Punk Goes Pop Vol. 7, the newest installment of Fearless' Punk Goes... series. They covered pop singer Justin Bieber's hit song, "Love Yourself", for the album. The compilation was released on July 14, 2017, via Fearless Records. On July 19, 2017, Grayscale released a music video for their cover of "Love Yourself".

On February 12, 2018, the band released the music video for their song, "Forever Yours", through Billboard.

=== 2019–2020: Nella Vita ===
On March 17, 2019, Grayscale announced via their Twitter account that they had parted ways with drummer Nick Veno, citing "creative differences." Veno later released a statement on his own account providing his view of the situation, which differed from the band's previous statement. The band clarified that Veno would finish out playing the band's remaining tour dates with them and that more details on his departure would be released the following day. It turned out to later be a prank toward the release of a new music video for the song "If I Ever See You Again" and that Veno would not be leaving the band.

On May 16, 2019, the band released a music video for their first single since Adornment, "Painkiller Weather". On June 24, 2019, the band on their social media teased what would be their second single off of Nella Vita, in the form of "In Violet" through PopCrush. They released the song and video on July 1. The band's second album Nella Vita was also announced on July 1 with a September 6, 2019 release date. Nick Ventimiglia drew inspiration from artists like Bruno Mars, Michael Jackson, and Prince for the record, while Andrew Kyne was influenced by Motown and Jon Bellion.

Their next singles "Old Friends" and "Baby Blue" were released on August 9 and August 23, respectively. A video for "Baby Blue" premiered on August 27 through RockSound. A music video for Young was released in October 2019. Loudwire named the album one of the 50 best rock efforts of 2019.

In promotion for their second album, Grayscale set out on their 1st ever headlining tour, The Nella Vita Tour, across the United States along with the likes of pop punk bands Belmont (band), Bearings and Rich People. The tour spanned from September 3 in Asbury Park, New Jersey to October 5 in Philadelphia, PA.

In November 2019, the band announced that they were going on a second tour around the United States in 2020. The Nella Vita Tour Part 2 goes from January 24 in Wilmington, DE to February 27 in Lancaster, PA. The tour package included Chicago based punk band Lurk, English pop punk band WSTR and Michigan based pop punk band Hot Mulligan.

In January 2020, Grayscale announced that they will headline some shows in Europe, and also open some shows for Four Year Strong.

=== 2021–2022: Umbra ===
The band released their third studio album, Umbra, on August 27, 2021. Vocalist Collin Walsh describes the project as "the record where [they] began to truly figure [themselves] out," noting that the record "feels like the most authentic version" of the band. Standout songs include the emotional "Live Again," inspired by Walsh's father's illness.

Grayscale subsequently embarked on their tour in support of the album on November 1, 2021. Walsh described the tour as "a killer show with killer energy every night," showcasing the band's passion for the record and their talent as live performers.

Grayscale is no longer affiliated with Fearless Records, as they are listed on Fearless's alumni section.

=== 2023–present: The Hart ===
Grayscale began teasing new music in July 2023. On September 8, 2023, they released a new single titled "Not Afraid to Die", a song described as feeling 'more true to themselves than [ever] on their latest single. The band spent the last couple of years writing and dialing in their sound at a deeper level than ever before, and the attention to detail in their craft shines through this track. “Not Afraid To Die” encapsulates a lot of the unapologetic and immovable nature of Philadelphia families in its lyrics'. This was their first release since What We're Missing to not be released with Fearless Records. In May, 2024 the band released another single, "Mum II", followed in July with "Summer Clothes". On September 20, 2024, the band released single, "Let Go", and officially announced their fourth studio album, "The Hart".

On October 25, 2024, Grayscale released the fifth single from their upcoming album, "Kept Me Alive". The song was promoted through a community phone number, featuring a puzzle to unveil the new song. On November 22, 2024, the band released the sixth single, "Don't Leave Me In the Dark".

== Musical style and influences ==
Grayscale's style has been described as pop-punk, as well as "blending pure, raw emotion with elements of alternative rock and punk roots".

== Tour ==
Headlining Tours

- The Nella Vita US Tour Part 1 (September 3, 2019 – October 5, 2019)
- The Nella Vita US Tour Part 2 (January 24, 2020 – February 27, 2020)
- The Umbra US Tour (November 3, 2021 – December 5, 2021)
- Live in Colour UK & EU Tour (November 8, 2025 - November 27, 2025)

Supporting Tours

- Mayday Parade 20th Anniversary Tour (2025)
- I Love You But I Chose the Maine Tour (2026)

== Band members ==
Current members

- Collin Walsh – lead vocals (2011–present); guitar (2023–present)
- Andrew Kyne – lead guitar, backing vocals (2011–present)
- Dallas Molster – rhythm guitar, backing vocals (2011–present), keyboards (2020–present)
- Nick Veno – drums, percussion (2011–present)

Current touring musicians

- Noah Christian – bass guitar (2023–present)

Former members

- Derek Parker - bass guitar (2011–2016)
- Nick Ventimiglia – bass guitar (2016–2023)

Timeline

== Discography ==
Studio albums

- Adornment (2017)
- Nella Vita (2019)
- Umbra (2021)
- The Hart (2025)

EPs

- Leaving (2013)
- Change (2015)
- What We're Missing (2016)
- Live from the Barber Shop Studios (2020)
- Antumbra (2022)

Live albums

- Live from the TLA (2021)

Compilation appearances

- Punk Goes Pop Vol. 7 (2017) – "Love Yourself" (originally performed by Justin Bieber)
- Punk Goes Acoustic Vol. 3 (2019) – Atlantic (Acoustic)
