= Big Bear Stores =

Defunct supermarket chain in the midwestern United States

Big Bear
- Type: Supermarket
- Industry: Retail
- Founded: 1933
- Defunct: 2004
- Fate: Closed
- Headquarters: Columbus, Ohio
- Products: Bakery, dairy, deli, frozen foods, general grocery, meat, pharmacy, produce, seafood, snacks, liquor

Big Bear Stores was an American regional supermarket chain operating in the U.S. states of Ohio and West Virginia between 1933 and 2004. The company was founded in Columbus, Ohio, and was headquartered there until its acquisition by Syracuse, New York-based Penn Traffic in 1989. Upon Penn Traffic's bankruptcy in 2004, all remaining Big Bear Stores closed.

== History ==
Big Bear Stores was founded in November 1933 by Wayne E. Brown. The first Big Bear Store opened on February 15, 1934, on West Lane Avenue in Columbus, Ohio, in what was once a dance hall, a roller skating rink and finally a tan bark ring for horse shows. This opening marked the beginning of self-service supermarketing in the Midwest. This first store was adjacent to the campus of Ohio State University (now the site of the Riverwatch Tower apartments); within a year, a second store opened in Columbus. By the end of the second year, two more stores had opened, followed by stores in Lancaster, Marion, Newark, and Toledo, Ohio.

It was the first self-serve supermarket in the Midwest and was the first supermarket in the country to use cashier-operated motorized conveyor belts, and claimed several innovative services, including its own trolley line. Big Bear introduced shopping carts to their stores in 1937. Big Bear operated a farm north of Columbus (later the site of store #272), as well as the Big Bear Bakery, located near the OSU campus. In 1948, Brown, along with other supermarket operators, founded Topco Associates, and Big Bear distributed their products (i.e. Food Club, Valu Time) as their "house brand", as well as their own private brand "Betty Brown", named after the founder's wife. Like many other stores, Big Bear had a trading stamp program. For many years their orange and blue "Buckeye" stamps were a familiar sight for shoppers.

From its inception until its closing, Big Bear Stores, Inc., resisted the unionization of its employees, despite the fact that most of its competitors' workers were members of various unions. In exchange for a marginally lower per-hour salary rate, according to Big Bear executives in the 1960s, the company's employees at all levels had routine, confidential access to corporate representatives who would investigate any complaint on the part of any employee about working conditions at any Big Bear store.

In the 1950s, Big Bear became the first supermarket in the nation to use the new IBM 305 RAMAC mainframe computer. In 1954, a new prototype store was opened in north Columbus's Graceland Shopping Center. With an interior store layout that became an industry standard, the store featured perishable items in the center of the stores and lower displays to highlight products. In the same year, Big Bear Stores Co. purchased Harts Stores, a department store that was operating at the time in the basements of two Big Bears. Harts experienced rapid growth, as Big Bear often opened grocery stores along with a Harts Department Store in an adjacent space.

For a period of several years in the early to mid-1980s, some of the grocery stores were converted to a warehouse concept, and operated under "The Grocery Warehouse" name, although still owned and operated by Big Bear. The store in Portsmouth, Ohio (adjacent to a Harts Department Store) was one such example.

Over time, Big Bear became a major supermarket chain in Ohio and West Virginia. In July 1988, the company started its hyperstore Big Bear Plus concept in Wintersville, Ohio (140,000 sq ft (13,000 m^{2})), and Bridgeport, Ohio (100,000 sq ft (10,000 m^{2})), the stores featured 40 percent food and 60 percent general merchandise. The concept was a combination of its Harts Stores (29 stores in 1991) and the Big Bear Grocery format.

Towards the end of 1990, the company decided to favor the Big Bear Plus store format over the Harts general merchandise format and started to slowly shutter or convert all remaining Harts locations. In 1991, ten side-by-side Big Bear and Harts locations were converted to the Big Bear Plus format. Before the demise of the company there were 21 Big Bear Plus stores.

== Savings card ==
Big Bear Stores introduced a savings card at all stores on September 14, 2000, in response to the Kroger card which was introduced a year earlier. It was known as the "Big Bear Wild Card". After Penn Traffic announced that Big Bear was ceasing operations, Kroger announced that it would now honor the Big Bear Wild Cards at their stores.

== Big Bear Credit Union ==
The credit union was founded in June 1957, as Big Bear Employees Credit Union by a group of employees that worked for the former Big Bear Stores Company. The credit union's office was located within the headquarters of the Big Bear Stores Company, located at 770 W. Goodale Blvd. in Columbus, Ohio. In 1983, the credit union moved its office to a Big Bear Stores satellite office, located at 1184 Dublin Road in Columbus. The new location allowed the credit union to double its space and provided enough room for six employees. In 1990, the credit union moved into its first office with its own public entrance, located in converted warehouse space at 851 W. 3rd Avenue in Columbus. In March 2003, noting that only fifteen percent of the credit union's members were employed by Big Bear Stores Company, the credit union's membership voted to change the name of the credit union to Members First Credit Union, providing the credit union with a brand new identity. By the end of 2003, Big Bear Stores announced that their company would cease operations by the beginning of 2004. In March 2004, the credit union moved into a newly built facility, located at 1445 W. Goodale Blvd. in the heart of the Grandview / Marble Cliff area.

== Decline and closure ==
In 1976, the company went private in a leveraged buyout, by six company executives. Big Bear again went public in 1983. The company's success began to falter in the late-1980s with new competition from alternative formats like Cub Foods and Meijer entering its market area. Due to the increased competitive situation, the chain made the hard decision to put itself on the auction block in late 1988 after 54 years as an independent company, including periods of both public and private ownership.

The large supermarket holding company Penn Traffic, which owned several regional chains, purchased Big Bear in April 1989 with an offer of $35 (~$79.00 in 2025) per share for all outstanding common stock. Penn Traffic borrowed heavily to leverage the buyout, and foisted debt on the company. In 1993, Big Bear Stores became a division of the Penn Traffic Company, and went through a series of changes in business and marketing strategies, such as moving down-market, to aim at a broader segment, but alienating their wealthier clientele. One of the changes including the removal of longtime Big Bear President Steven Breech and his leadership team. Breech's replacement, Phillip Hawkins, a former Vons Supermarket CEO was promoted as a turnaround specialist.

One of his first tasks was responding to reduced sales volumes at most store locations by lowering overhead costs as much as possible. As long-time Columbus area shoppers complained about declining conditions in the Columbus area stores, Hawkins and company launched its infamous "All We Did Was Listen" advertising campaign in June 1997, which featured Hawkins speaking in front of Big Bear employees in a reassuring tone of voice. Hawkins' plan was to take Big Bear from its role as an upper market chain to a more "competitive" level by reducing overhead in store operations. As sales volumes continued to drop due to increased competition, it resulted in lower payroll costs which caused conditions in the stores to decline.

As the Big Bear division began to have cash flow issues in 2003, product suppliers pulled their items from store shelves as most accounts went past due. Employees within Big Bear made a joke of Hawkins and his "All we did was listen" as hollow proof that management "listened" to employee and shopper concerns, but it seemed that was all they were prepared to do. By the end of Hawkins' brief tenure, Big Bear was hemorrhaging red ink and closing stores.

The chain's demise was finalized in 2004 when the last Big Bear store closed its doors, following Penn Traffic's second Chapter 11 bankruptcy in a decade. Better store locations were acquired and reopened as Giant Eagle or Kroger stores; as of May 2014, many former Big Bear stores (especially in Ohio and West Virginia) remain empty.
