= Hearts =

Hearts most commonly refers to:

- Hearts (card game), a trick-taking game
  - Black Lady, a common variant of Hearts
- Hearts (suit), one of the standard four suits of cards
- Heart, an organ

Hearts may also refer to:

== Music ==
- The Hearts, an American girl group closely related to the Jaynetts

=== Albums ===
- Hearts (America album)
- Hearts (I Break Horses album)
- Hearts, an album by Lenny

=== Songs ===
- "Hearts" (song), a 1981 song by Marty Balin
- "Hearts", a 1983 song by Yes from 90125

== Sports ==
- Auckland Hearts, a New Zealand women's cricket team
- Buchanhaven Hearts F.C., a Scottish football club based in Aberdeenshire
- Buncrana Hearts F.C., an association football club based in the Inishowen peninsula, County Donegal, Northern Ireland
- Heart of Midlothian F.C., a Scottish football club based in Edinburgh
- Kelty Hearts F.C., a Scottish football club based in Fife
- Kennoway Star Hearts J.F.C., a Scottish football club based in Fife
- Portland Hearts of Pine, an American professional soccer team

== Other uses ==
- Microsoft Hearts, a computer implementation of the card game
- Heart (symbol) or ♥, a symbol representing love, the organ, or a card suit

== See also ==
- Hart (disambiguation)
- Heart (disambiguation)
