= Clackamas County Fair and Rodeo =

Rodeo venue in Canby, Oregon, US

Clackamas County Fair & Event Center
- Interactive map of Clackamas County Fair & Event Center
- Full name: Clackamas County Event Center
- Address: 694 NE 4th Ave; Canby; USA
- Location: 694 NE 4th Avenue; Canby, Oregon, 97013
- Coordinates: 45°16′03″N 122°41′08″W
- Owner: Clackamas County Fair Board

Construction
- Opened: 1907

Tenant
- Canby Rodeo

Website
- https://clackamascountyfair.com

The Clackamas Country Fair and Rodeo is a five-day long event held at the Clackamas County Fairgrounds in the city of Canby in Clackamas County, Oregon, United States, during the third week of August.

== History ==
The fair has been held yearly since 1907. It was first held in Gladstone Park. The Fair celebrated its 100 year occurrence in 2006. The fair was not held in 1917, 1918, 1942, 1943, 1944, 1945, and 2020.

== Activities ==
Activities include amusement rides, livestock exhibits and competitions, live entertainment on three stages, local handcraft work and produce, and a Professional Rodeo Cowboys Association (PRCA) rodeo.

== Rodeo events ==
The rodeo is sanctioned by the Professional Rodeo Cowboys Association (PRCA). Rodeo events include: bareback riding, tie-down roping, saddle bronc riding, steer wrestling, team roping, barrel racing, and bull riding.
