= Judge Hart =

Judge Hart may refer to:

- Elijah Carson Hart (1857–1929), judge of the California Third District Court of Appeal
- George Luzerne Hart Jr. (1905–1984), judge of the United States District Court for the District of Columbia
- William Thomas Hart (1929–2023), judge of the United States District Court for the Northern District of Illinois

== See also ==
- Justice Hart (disambiguation)
