= Elkhart =

Elkhart is the name of several places in U.S.A.:

- Elkhart, Illinois
- Elkhart, Indiana
- Elkhart, Iowa
- Elkhart, Kansas
- Elkhart, Texas
- Elkhart County, Indiana
- Elkhart Lake, Wisconsin
- Elkhart River, Indiana

== See also ==
- Hart (disambiguation)
- Elk (disambiguation)
