= Hart (given name) =

Hart is a given name. Notable people with the name include:

- Hart Bochner (born 1956), Canadian actor, screenwriter, director, and producer
- Hart Crane (1899–1932), American poet
- Hart Pease Danks (1834–1903), American musician
- Hart D. Fisher, American author and writer
- Hart Hanson (born 1957), Canadian writer and producer
- Hart Pomerantz, 20th-century Canadian lawyer and television personality

== See also ==
- Hart
- Hart (surname)
- Hart (sultan)
