= Hartford Township =

Hartford Township may refer to:

- Hartford Township, Sebastian County, Arkansas, in Sebastian County, Arkansas
- Hartford Township, Adams County, Indiana
- Hartford Township, Iowa County, Iowa
- Hartford Township, Michigan
- Hartford Township, Todd County, Minnesota
- Hartford Township, Pike County, Missouri
- Hartford Township, Licking County, Ohio
- Hartford Township, Trumbull County, Ohio
- Hartford Township, Minnehaha County, South Dakota, in Minnehaha County, South Dakota
