= Canby Depot Museum =

- Established: Early 1980s
- Location: Canby, Oregon
- Coordinates: 45.266494°N 122.683033°W
- Type: Railway and local history museum
- Website: www.canbyhistoricalsociety.org

The Canby Depot Museum is a railway and local history museum in Canby, Oregon, and housed in the former Canby Depot building. Exhibits include photographs, school memorabilia, a postal service and doctor/dentist displays, antique toys, telephones, cameras, and a print shop.

The Canby Depot is the oldest train station in Oregon. It is a Southern Pacific Railroad standard design, a One Story Combination Depot No. 11. The depot originally stood at the intersection of N. First and Grant Streets. It was moved to its current location at the corner of N.E. 4th and Pine and converted into a museum by the Canby Historical Society in the early 1980s.
