= McKayla Fricker =

American middle-distance runner (born 1992)

Personal information
- Nationality: American
- Born: April 19, 1992 (age 34) Canby, Oregon, U.S.
- Height: 5 ft 9 in (1.75 m)

Sport
- Sport: Middle-distance running
- Club: Brooks Sports
- Team: Seattle Pacific University
- Turned pro: 2014
- Coached by: Jonathan Marcus, High Performance West distance coach

Achievements and titles
- National finals: 2015, 2016
- Personal best(s): 800 m: 2:00.81 (2015) 1500 m: 4:18.14 (2015) 400 m: 54.50 i
Medal record
Women's athletics
Representing the United States

McKayla Fricker (born April 19, 1992, in Canby, Oregon) is a middle distance American athlete.

== Professional ==
McKayla Fricker signed with Brooks.

McKayla Fricker-Smucker placed 14th in 800 m running 2:03 at 2016 Olympic Trials.

Fricker-Smucker placed 4th in 800 m running 2:02.84 at 2016 USA Indoor Track and Field Championships.

McKayla Fricker placed 10th in 800 m running 2:00.81 at 2015 USA Outdoor Track and Field Championships.

== NCAA ==
Fricker won 800 m in 2:06.18 at the 2014 NCAA Women's Division II Outdoor Track and Field Championships.

McKayla Fricker won three 2014 Great Northwest Athletic Conference outdoor track and field titles (1500 m: 4:28.19; 800 m: 2:09.15; 4 × 400 m: 3:50.05).

McKayla Fricker finished second in 800 m in 2:09.25 at the 2014 NCAA Women's Division II Indoor Track and Field Championships.

McKayla Fricker finished eleventh in 800 m in 2:11.86 and seventh in 4 × 400 m in 3:43.40 2013 NCAA Women's Division II Outdoor Track and Field Championships.

McKayla Fricker won 2013 GNAC outdoor track and field titles in 800 m in 2:10.24 and 4 × 400 m in 3:44.11.

McKayla Fricker finished fourth in 800 m in 2:10.76 at the 2013 NCAA Women's Division II Indoor Track and Field Championships.

McKayla Fricker won 2012 GNAC outdoor track and field titles in 800 m in 2:11.79 and 4 × 400 m in 3:48.79.

McKayla Fricker finished fifth in 800 m in 2:11.69 at the 2012 NCAA Women's Division II Indoor Track and Field Championships.

McKayla Fricker won 2012 GNAC indoor track and field title in 800 m in 2:15.53.
