= Hart Island (Washington) =

Island on the Skagit River in Washington

Coordinates: 48°29′09″N 122°15′36″W

Hart Island is a minor island in Washington. It is located near the city of Sedro-Woolley on the Skagit River, and is carved out by the Hart Slough. DeBays Island is adjacent to Hart Island.
