= Hart, Minnesota =

Unincorporated community in Minnesota, United States

Hart
- Unincorporated community
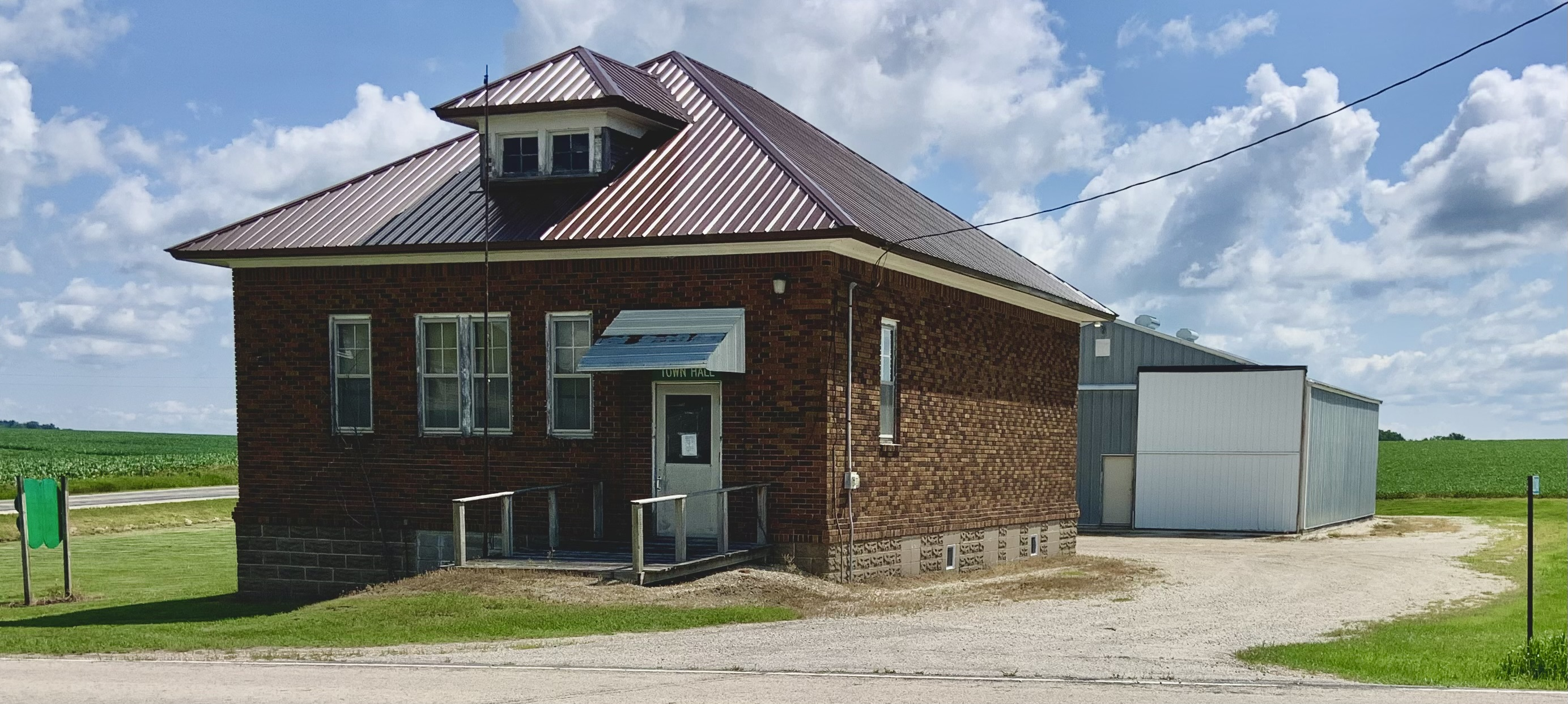
- Hart Town Hall

- Location within Minnesota Location within the United States
- Coordinates: 43°52′32″N 91°44′24″W
- Country: United States
- State: Minnesota
- County: Winona
- Elevation: 1,204 ft (367 m)
- Time zone: UTC-6 (Central (CST))
  - Summer (DST): UTC-5 (CDT)
- Area code: 507
- GNIS feature ID: 1817653

Hart is an unincorporated community in Hart Township, Winona County, Minnesota, United States. The Metz Family Farm and the Metz Hart-Land Creamery and cheese plant are located near Hart.
