= Hart Township, Wright County, Missouri =

Township in Wright County, Missouri, U.S.

Coordinates: 37.204569°N 92.462886°W

Hart Township is an inactive township in Wright County, in the U.S. state of Missouri.

Hart Township was erected in 1841, taking its name from Isaac Hart, a pioneer citizen.
