= Hartford Township, Pike County, Missouri =

Inactive township in the U.S. state of Missouri

Coordinates: 39.1828°N 91.3050°W

Hartford Township is an inactive township in Pike County, in the U.S. state of Missouri.

Hartford Township most likely was named after Hertford, England, perhaps via another an American town of the same name.
