= Hartt =

Hartt is a surname. Notable people with the surname include:

- Cecil Hartt (1884–1930), Australian cartoonist
- Charles Frederick Hartt (1840–1878), Canadian-American geologist, paleontologist and naturalist
- Dale Hartt (born 1979), American mixed martial artist
- Edmund Hartt, American shipbuilder
- James Irwin Hartt (1867 – after 1919), Canadian politician
- Frederick Hartt (1914–1991), American art historian
- Maurice Hartt (1895–1950), Romanian-born Canadian politician
- Reg Hartt (born 1946), Canadian film archivist and critic
- Rollin Lynde Hartt (1869–1946), American journalist
- Stanley Hartt (1937–2018), Canadian lawyer and businessman
- Thomas Aaron Hartt (1858–1930), Canadian politician

Hartt may also refer to:

- University of Hartford Hartt School, a performing arts conservatory in Connecticut, United States
