= Heart (mobile design) =

Heart is a framework developed by Google to help the products and development teams to make decisions that serve business and user-centered. Heart is a framework for mobile design and metrics. It is an acronym that stands for happiness, engagement, adoption, retention and task success. Included by Gartner as a design approach that accommodates mobile interface issues such as partial user attention and interruption.
