= Hart County =

Hart County is the name of two counties in the United States:

- Hart County, Georgia
- Hart County, Kentucky
