= International Reptile Rescue =

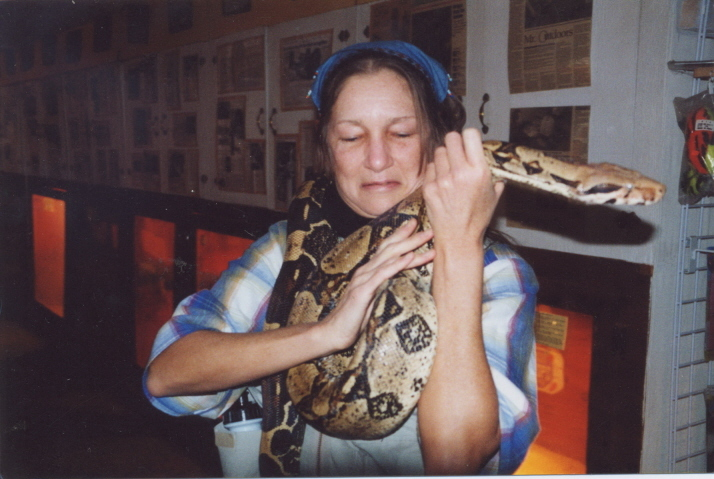
- Visitor holding a boa constrictor
- Interactive map of International Reptile Rescue
- 45.214757°N 122.634378°W
- Date opened: 1978
- Location: Canby, Oregon, United States
- Website: www.hartsreptileworld.com

International Reptile Rescue, formerly known as Hart's Reptile World, is a not-for-profit reptile rescue organization located in Canby, Oregon, United States. The organization works to rescue all members of the reptile family, including snakes, turtles, tortoises, lizards, alligators and crocodiles. Founded in 1978, the organization also educates the public about reptiles through outreach programs, including offering lectures in educational settings such as libraries, science museums, television appearances and specially arranged birthday parties.

Under the name of Hart's Reptile World, the organization was often featured in the local Oregon and Washington media, as well as larger media venues. For example, some pythons from the exhibit were featured in the video Sowing the Seeds of Love by Tears for Fears, and Wilbur the Crocodile was featured in the Michael Jackson video "Leave Me Alone."

== See also ==
- Herpetoculture
