= Hart Lake Township, Hubbard County, Minnesota =

Hart Lake Township, Minnesota
- Township
- Location of Hart Lake Township, within Hubbard County, Minnesota
- Coordinates: 47°17′2″N 94°43′2″W
- Country: United States
- State: Minnesota
- County: Hubbard

Area
  - Total: 35.5 sq mi (92.0 km^{2})
  - Land: 33.8 sq mi (87.6 km^{2})
  - Water: 1.7 sq mi (4.4 km^{2})
- Elevation: 1,430 ft (436 m)

Population (2020)
  - Total: 543
  - Density: 16.1/sq mi (6.20/km^{2})
- Time zone: UTC-6 (Central (CST))
  - Summer (DST): UTC-5 (CDT)
- FIPS code: 27-27386
- GNIS feature ID: 0664405

Hart Lake Township is a township in Hubbard County, Minnesota, United States. The population was 543 at the 2020 census.

This township took its name from Hart Lake.

== Geography ==
According to the United States Census Bureau, the township has a total area of 35.5 square miles (92 km^{2}), of which 33.8 square miles (88 km^{2}) is land and 1.7 square miles (4.4 km^{2}) (4.79%) is water.

== Demographics ==
As of the census of 2000, there were 466 people, 165 households, and 134 families residing in the township. The population density was 13.8 inhabitants per square mile (5.3/km^{2}). There were 233 housing units at an average density of 6.9 per square mile (2.7/km^{2}). The racial makeup of the township was 83.91% White, 13.95% Native American, 0.21% Asian, and 1.93% from two or more races. Hispanic or Latino of any race were 0.43% of the population.

There were 165 households, out of which 30.9% had children under the age of 18 living with them, 64.8% were married couples living together, 10.3% had a female householder with no husband present, and 18.2% were non-families. 11.5% of all households were made up of individuals, and 2.4% had someone living alone who was 65 years of age or older. The average household size was 2.82 and the average family size was 3.04.

In the township the population was spread out, with 26.8% under the age of 18, 10.1% from 18 to 24, 23.2% from 25 to 44, 29.4% from 45 to 64, and 10.5% who were 65 years of age or older. The median age was 39 years. For every 100 females, there were 113.8 males. For every 100 females age 18 and over, there were 118.6 males.

The median income for a household in the township was $38,750, and the median income for a family was $37,083. Males had a median income of $30,417 versus $22,125 for females. The per capita income for the township was $17,156. About 20.5% of families and 18.9% of the population were below the poverty line, including 34.7% of those under age 18 and 17.5% of those age 65 or over.
