= Justice Hart =

Justice Hart may refer to:

- James P. Hart (1904–1987), justice of the Texas Supreme Court
- Jesse C. Hart (1864–1933), associate justice of the Arkansas Supreme Court
- John De Hart (1727–1795), associate justice of the New Jersey Supreme Court
- Josephine L. Hart (born 1943), associate justice of the Arkansas Supreme Court
- Ossian B. Hart (1821–1874), associate justice of the Florida Supreme Court
- William L. Hart (1867–1962), associate justice of the Ohio Supreme Court

== See also ==
- Judge Hart (disambiguation)
