= Hartland Township =

Hartland Township may refer to:

- Hartland Township, McHenry County, Illinois
- Hartland Township, Worth County, Iowa
- Hartland Township, Kearny County, Kansas
- Hartland Township, Michigan
- Hartland Township, Freeborn County, Minnesota
- Hartland Township, Huron County, Ohio
- Hartland Township, Beadle County, South Dakota, in Beadle County, South Dakota
- Hartland Township, Kingsbury County, South Dakota, in Kingsbury County, South Dakota
