= Hart Lake (Swift County, Minnesota) =

Lake in the state of Minnesota, United States

- Location within Minnesota
- Location: Swift County, Minnesota
- Coordinates: 45°16′28″N 96°5′13″W
- Type: lake

Hart Lake is a lake in Swift County, in the U.S. state of Minnesota.

Hart Lake took the name of Isaac Hart, a pioneer settler.

== See also ==
- List of lakes in Minnesota
