= Heart River (Wyoming) =

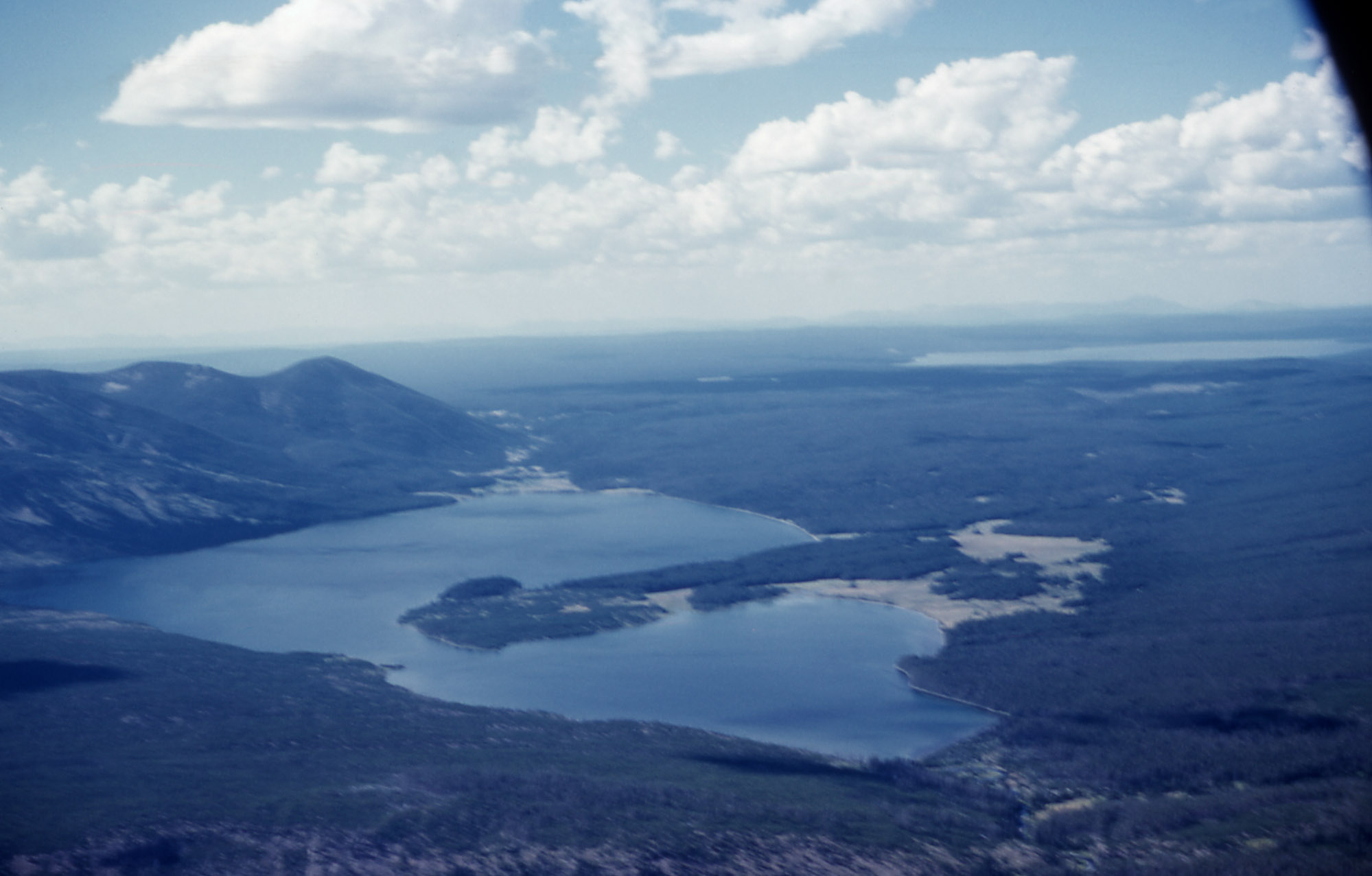
- Heart Lake

Location
- Country: United States

Physical characteristics
- Source
  - coordinates: 44°15′02″N 110°27′00″W
- Mouth
  - coordinates: 44°12′48″N 110°29′09″W
  - elevation: 7,274 ft (2,217 m)
- Length: 4.8 mi (7.7 km)
- Basin size: 30 mi^{2} (78 km^{2})
- Discharge
  - average: 303 cuft/s

Basin features
- Progression: North-south

The Heart River is a 4.8-mile-long (7.7 km) river in the U.S. state of Wyoming, tributary to the Snake River. Its entire course is contained inside Yellowstone National Park. The river rises on the Continental Divide, in the Rocky Mountains, a few miles southeast of Yellowstone Lake. Its headwater streams flow into Heart Lake, from whose southeastern end the main Heart River issues, receiving two tributary streams from the northeast and flowing southwest into a short but steep gorge. It then continues generally south for roughly 4 miles (6 km) before emptying into the Snake near the boundary with the Teton National Forest.

== See also ==
- Fishes of Yellowstone National Park
- Lewis River
