= The Hart =

Studio album by Grayscale
- Released: January 31, 2025
- Recorded: 2022–2024
- Studio: Palmquist Studios (Los Angeles)
- Genres: Alternative rock; pop punk
- Length: 39:53
- Label: Infield Records
- Producers: Eric Palmquist; Danen Rector

Grayscale chronology
Umbra (2021)	The Hart (2025)

Singles from The Hart
- 1. "Not Afraid to Die" Released: August 9, 2023; 2. "Mum II" Released: May 12, 2024; 3. "Summer Clothes" Released: July 18, 2024; 4. "Let Go" Released: September 20, 2024; 5. "Kept Me Alive" Released: October 25, 2024; 6. "Don't Leave Me In the Dark" Released: November 22, 2024

The Hart is the fourth studio album by American rock band Grayscale, it was released on January 31, 2025, through Infield Records. It is the band's first release since 2016's What We're Missing to not be released through Fearless Records.

== Background and promotion ==
The album was inspired by personal experiences and reflects themes of love, loss, and nostalgia. It is considered a deeply personal project for the band, with lead vocalist Collin Walsh emphasizing the importance of capturing genuine emotions throughout the record. “The Hart” continues Grayscale’s tradition of blending emotional lyricism with a dynamic sound that incorporates elements of pop-punk and alternative rock. The title, The Hart, is symbolic, representing both the vulnerability of the human heart and the resilience of the band’s journey. The band began promoting The Hart with the release of several singles. The second single, “Mum II,” debuted in May 2024 and was praised for its heartfelt lyrics and stripped-down production. Another single, “Summer Clothes,” released later that year, offered a more upbeat and nostalgic tone, with a music video that emphasized themes of carefree summer days. The band officially announced the album through social media and press outlets on September 17, 2024, with Walsh describing it as “a milestone for us creatively.”

== Critical reception ==
Professional ratings
Review scores
Source	Rating
CaliberTV	8/10 stars
The Review Geek	8/10
New Noise Magazine	5/5 stars

The Hart received generally very positive reviews. CaliberTV praised the album for encapsulating the band's signature elements, highlighting its lyrical maturity and melodic composition. The review commended the opening title track's orchestral introduction and the energetic transition into "Kept Me Alive," noting the immediate establishment of the album's tone.

Good Guys Press lauded the album as a powerful testament to resilience, emphasizing its raw emotional expression and the band's growth both musically and emotionally. The review highlighted the band's successful experimentation with new sounds while staying true to their roots, resulting in a cohesive and heartfelt collection of tracks.

The Review Geek described The Hart as a "triumphant, emotional depiction of regret and sorrow," likening its narrative cohesion to that of an ambitious novel. The review praised the album's guitar-driven arrangements and the band's adeptness at crafting songs that interweave to create boundless energy and a structured concept.

== Track listing ==
The Hart track listing
No.	Title	Writer(s)	Length
1.	"The Hart"	Andrew Kyne; Dallas Molster; Danen Rector; Nick Veno; Collin Walsh	1:11
2.	"Kept Me Alive"	John Samuel Gerhart; A. Kyne; D. Molster; D. Rector; Dan Swank; N. Veno; C. Walsh	2:57
3.	"Through the Landslide"	J.S. Gerhart; A. Kyne; D. Molster; D. Rector; D. Swank; N. Veno; C. Walsh	3:40
4.	"Talking in My Sleep"	Colin Creev; A. Kyne; D. Molster; D. Rector; D. Swank; N. Veno; C. Walsh	4:06
5.	"Let Go"	Johnathan Capeci; A. Kyne; D. Molster; D. Rector; N. Veno; C. Walsh	2:48
6.	"Summer Clothes"	Katie Cecil; Aaron Chafin; A.Kyne; D. Molster; Eric Palmquist; D. Rector; C. Walsh; N. Veno	2:39
7.	"Some Kind of Magic"	Courtney Ballard; Christo Bowman; A. Kyne; D. Molster; Stefano Pigliapoco; D. Rector; D. Swank; N. Veno; C. Walsh	2:33
8.	"Dance with Your Ghost"	Luke Arens; A. Kyne; D. Molster; D. Rector; N. Veno; C. Walsh	3:00
9.	"Don't Leave Me in the Dark"	A. Kyne; D. Molster; D. Rector; D. Swank; N. Veno; C. Walsh	3:53
10.	"Painting over You"	A. Kyne; D. Molster; D. Rector; Doug Showalter; N. Veno; C. Walsh	4:47
11.	"Mum II"	A. Kyne; D. Molster; N. Veno; C. Walsh	4:54
12.	"Not Afraid to Die"	Nick Bruns; A. Kyne; D. Molster; N. Veno; C. Walsh	3:25
Total length:			39:53

The Hart (Deluxe) track listing
No.	Title	Writer(s)	Length
1.	"The Hart"	Andrew Kyne; Dallas Molster; Danen Rector; Nick Veno; Collin Walsh	1:11
2.	"Kept Me Alive" (with Slowly Slowly)	John Samuel Gerhart; A. Kyne; D. Molster; D. Rector; Dan Swank; N. Veno; C. Walsh	2:57
3.	"Through the Landslide" (with VEAUX)	J.S. Gerhart; A. Kyne; D. Molster; D. Rector; D. Swank; N. Veno; C. Walsh	3:42
4.	"Talking in My Sleep" (with Aaron Gillespie)	Colin Creev; A. Kyne; D. Molster; D. Rector; D. Swank; N. Veno; C. Walsh	4:04
5.	"Let Go" (Remix)	Johnathan Capeci; A. Kyne; D. Molster; D. Rector; N. Veno; C. Walsh	2:58
6.	"Summer Clothes" (with Games We Play & Trella)	Katie Cecil; Aaron Chafin; A.Kyne; Alex LeCavalier; D. Molster; Eric Palmquist; D. Rector; C. Walsh; N. Veno	2:55
7.	"Some Kind of Magic" (with Smallpools)	Courtney Ballard; Christo Bowman; A. Kyne; D. Molster; Stefano Pigliapoco; D. Rector; D. Swank; N. Veno; C. Walsh	2:40
8.	"Dance with Your Ghost" (with Wind Walkers)	Luke Arens; A. Kyne; D. Molster; D. Rector; N. Veno; C. Walsh	3:00
9.	"Don't Leave Me in the Dark" (with Slow Joy & Caroline Romano)	A. Kyne; D. Molster; D. Rector; D. Swank; N. Veno; C. Walsh	4:05
10.	"Painting over You" (with Cassadee Pope)	A. Kyne; D. Molster; D. Rector; Doug Showalter; N. Veno; C. Walsh	4:45
11.	"Mum II" (with Derek Sanders)	A. Kyne; D. Molster; N. Veno; C. Walsh	4:55
12.	"Not Afraid to Die" (with The Wonder Years)	Nick Bruns; A. Kyne; D. Molster; N. Veno; C. Walsh	3:18
Total length:			40:30

== Personnel ==
Grayscale

- Dallas Molster - rhythm & acoustic guitar, backing vocals, synthesizer, piano, bass
- Andrew Kyne - lead guitar, backing vocals, saxophone
- Nick Veno - drums, percussion
- Collin Walsh - lead vocals, guitar

Additional personnel

- Lucas Anderson - bass
- Neal Avron - mixing
- Quan Bui - album packaging and layout
- Jacob Darby - album art
- Chris Gehringer - mastering
- Sam Moses - mastering
- Eric Palmquist - production, backing vocals
- Danen Rector - production, backing vocals
- Caroline Romano - backing vocals (9)
- Naomi Samilton - backing vocals (9)
