= Harts (surname) =

Harts is a surname. Notable people with the surname include:

- Greg Harts (born 1950), American baseball player
- John A. Harts (1873–1947), Oklahoma Sooners football coach
- Shaunard Harts (born 1978), American football player

== See also ==
- Hart (surname)
