= Hart (album) =

Studio album by Brainpower
- Released: April 19, 2008
- Recorded: February 2007 – January 2008
- Genre: Hip hop
- Length: 58:35
- Label: PIAS; Lyric Recordings
- Producer: Oh Jay; Brainpower; SirOJ; TLM; Gaspard de la Nuit; Mena$a; Thomas Bank; Tease

Brainpower chronology
Even Stil (2005)	Hart (2008)	Hard (2008)

Hart / Hard Box Set cover

Hart (Heart) is the fourth album by Dutch language rapper Brainpower. It was released April 21, 2008 on Lyric Recordings, together with his fifth album Hard (Hard) and contains the single "Eigen Werk" ("Own Work"). Hart and Hard are two albums sold together, where Hart represents the sensitive side of Brainpower with songs about his mother ("Ode Aan Me Mama" / "Ode To My Momma"), his father ("Zo Vader Zo Zoon" / "Like Father Like Son") and his girlfriend ("Als Jij Er Niet Bent" / "If You're Not Around" featuring his girlfriend Hind).

Hip Hop veteran Brainpower separates his more melodious material from his famous 'braggin' & boast' side.

Hart is based around themes like 'Anger', 'Fear', 'Hope', 'Pain' and 'Luck' and different sorts of love. The notion/word 'Hart' ('Heart') is the concept throughout. There are guest performances from Freek de Jonge, Hind and Candy Dulfer to DJs TLM and All Star Fresh.

== Track listing ==
#	Title	English Title	Featured artist(s)	Producer(s)	Length
01.	"Hart"	"Heart"		Oh Jay	3:12
02.	"De Elementen"	"The Elements"		Brainpower & TLM*	3:30
03.	"Wees Niet Bang"	"Don't Be Afraid"	Freek de Jonge	SirOJ	4:25
04.	"Eigen Werk"	"Own Work"	TLM	TLM	3:11
05.	"Ode Aan Me Mama"	"Ode to My Momma"		Oh Jay	3:53
06.	"Je Kent 't Wel (De Game)"	"You Know (The Game)"		TLM	4:05
07.	"Als Jij Er Niet Bent"	"If You're Not Around"	Hind	Brainpower	3:25
08.	"Old Skool Eer"	"Old Skool Honor"	All Star Fresh	Gaspard de la Nuit	5:16
09.	"Mellow & Memorabel"	"Mellow & Memorable"		Mena$a	3:47
10.	"Zonnestraal"	"Sun Ray"		TLM & Brainpower	6:03
11.	"Ik Praat Tegen Jou"	"I'm Talking to You"	Lloyd de Meza	Thomas Bank	4:21
12.	"Dingen"	"Things"		Tease	2:29
13.	"Zo Vader Zo Zoon"	"Like Father Like Son"	Gert Mulder & Candy Dulfer	Brainpower	5:12
14.	"Ziel van de Cultuur"	"Culture Soul"		SirOJ	5:46

* Only scratches.

== Album singles ==
Single information
"Eigen Werk" ("Own Work") featuring TLM
- Released: February 2, 2008
