= Hart Lake (Hubbard County, Minnesota) =

Lake in the state of Minnesota, United States

- Location within Minnesota
- Location: Hubbard County, Minnesota
- Coordinates: 47°17′23″N 94°45′10″W
- Type: lake

Hart Lake is a lake in Hubbard County, in the U.S. state of Minnesota.

Hart Lake was so named from the fact its outline is shaped like a heart.

== See also ==
- List of lakes in Minnesota
