= Harts Stores =

Harts Stores, Inc.
- Type: Discount stores
- Industry: Retail
- Founded: 1954 Columbus, Ohio
- Defunct: 2004 (aged 49–50)
- Headquarters: Columbus, Ohio
- Products: Clothing, footwear, bedding, furniture, jewelry, beauty products, electronics, and housewares.
- Parent: Big Bear Stores Inc.
- Website: None.

Harts Stores (Hart's Family Center) was a regional general merchandise chain in the midwestern United States, headquartered for many years in Columbus, Ohio.

== History ==
In 1954, Big Bear Stores Co., a Columbus, Ohio-based supermarket chain, purchased Harts Stores, a department store that was operating at the time in the basements of two Big Bears. Harts experienced rapid growth, as Big Bear often opened grocery stores along with a Harts Department Store in an adjacent space as well as many free-standing locations usually vacated by other department stores.

At its peak in the late 1980s, there were a total of 29 Harts Stores, but towards the end of 1990, the company decided to favor the Big Bear Plus store format over the Harts general merchandise format and started to slowly shutter or convert all remaining Harts locations.

In 1991, ten side-by-side Big Bear and Harts locations were converted to the Big Bear Plus format.

By 1996, all Harts stores were either closed or converted to Big Bear Plus Stores.

Big Bear was bought out by Penn Traffic in April 1989, and had closed all stores by early 2004.

== See also ==
- Penn Traffic
- Big Bear Stores
