= Prerana Reddy =

New York-based activist

Prerana Reddy is a New York-based activist involved with community engagement who works in many different areas and disciplines. Reddy was the Director of Public Programs and Community Engagement at the Queens Museum from 2005–2018, where she organized screenings, performances, discussions, and community-based collaborative programs and exhibits both on and off-site. Reddy has been engaged in the Queens community for many years, and has developed various programs and initiatives for immigrants, youth, non-English speakers, etc. Reddy is involved in the intersection of art and community, having co-curated the exhibition "Fatal Love: South Asian American Contemporary Art Now", as well as coordinated two editions of "Corona Plaza: Center of Everywhere", which commissioned eight artists to develop public art works that engage local residents on issues of neighborhood history and identity as well as tensions around its various transformations. Reddy's involvement in programs that engage communities include the access to language aid, healthcare, public space advocacy, and financial aid. Reddy received the Douglas Redd Fellowship for emerging leaders in the arts and community development sector, funded by the Ford Foundation and administered through Partners for Livable Communities.

== Early life and education ==
Prerana Reddy began her education at Duke University, where she received a Bachelor of Science with Honors in Cell & Molecular Biology, Chemistry, Film & Video. (1992–1996). She then continued her education at New York University with a Masters of Art in Cinema Studies. She completed the Culture & Media program jointly between the Cinema Studies and Anthropology Departments. (1998–2000). In 2010, Reddy studied at the University of Hawaii at Manoa in the Asia Pacific Leadership Program as an East-West Center Fellow.

Reddy, during her education, was involved with various student body organizations. She was a DJ and on the music staff at WXDU College Radio Station, a student organizer of NC Student Documentary Film Happening with the Center for Documentary Filmmaking, and was a member of the Green Earth Gang. Reddy was involved with providing free environmental science education to public school students, as well as being a researcher on a project regarding enzyme replacement therapy at Duke University Medical Center.

== Career ==
=== Queens Museum ===
Prerana Reddy was the Director of Public Programs and Community Engagement at the Queens Museum from 2005–2018. She organized events and shows for the museum while engaging the community, creating awareness for the arts, and the integration between the two. Reddy has organized shows such as Corona Plaza: Center of Everywhere, a unique installation that showcased four artists work in the Corona Plaza near the Queens Museum. Along with Greg Sholette and Tom Finkelpearl, she helped lead the 2013 SPQ seminar. The seminar critically surveyed "the theory and practice of recent, politically engaged visual culture while simultaneously locating it within the recent history of mainstream contemporary art."

=== Curatorial projects ===
"Corona Plaza: Center of Everywhere" June 10, 2007 – October 14, 2007

Prerana Reddy commissioned two editions of the exhibition Corona Plaza: Center of Everywhere. The Queens Museum commissioned four emerging artists to produce temporary, site specific pieces in the Corona Plaza. The project’s intent was to create a dialogue between the museum and community partners to work towards improving the health of community residents, beautifying the neighborhood, and activating public spaces in the area. The project was a part of a larger Heart of Corona initiative. The artists involved included Hector Canonge, Stephanie Diamond, Shaun El C. Leonardo, and Xaviera Simmons. The artists “were asked to develop projects that would integrate with the specific conditions of the plaza and Corona, resulting in works that, like much contemporary artistic practice, values audience participation, fun, generosity and community engagement. Separately, their works engage in a dialogue about what it means to be American in a neighborhood where over 65% of residents are foreign born, and in a nation where the subject of immigration is a hotly contested political battleground. The installation at the QMA describes, documents and expands on the projects and activities in the plaza.”

“Fatal Love” February 2005 – June 5, 2005

Reddy co-curated the exhibition “Fatal Love: South Asian American Art Now”, at the Queens Museum (February 2005- June 5, 2005), along with Jaishri Abichandani. Fatal Love examines the work of some of the most important, engaged, and emotionally charged artists of whom are working in the Northeastern United States. Fatal Love was presented in conjunction with “Edge of Desire: Recent Art in India”. Fatal Love showcases contemporary photography, print, video, and web-based installation from 28 emerging/established American Artists, of whom are of South Asian descent. “Fatal Love captures an important moment in South Asian American art; a moment of change, focus and redefinition”.

=== Community organization ===
Prerana Reddy developed an intensive arts & social justice program for immigrant youth, as well as a community development initiative for Corona, Queens residents. Many of these residents are new immigrants with mixed status families and limited English language proficiency.

Reddy is involved in fine art practice, as a documentary filmmaker and researcher. She covers topics that explore alternatives to juvenile detention, the history of slavery in New York City, and the 2004 World Social Forum in Mumbai. Reddy has extensive film programming experience, and has worked for different organizations/groups in this creative realm.

Reddy was a board member from 2000-2003 on the South Asian Women’s Creative Collective (SAWCC), a non-profit arts organization dedicated to the advancement, increased visibility, and development of emerging and established South Asian women artists. Reddy is currently on the board of Alwan for the Arts, an Arab & Middle Eastern cultural organization based in lower Manhattan. She also acted as a curator for the film program of Alwan. She is also a member of the collective "3rd I NY", a monthly film and music salon designed by local filmmakers/experimental DJ’s. 3rd I showcases the work of independent filmmakers of South Asian descent and local dj's, musicians and electronic artists. 3rd I creates an alternative forum for South Asian filmmakers, of whom previously have not had a strong platform to showcase their work. Reddy acted as a curator and program administrator for the New York African Film Festival at Lincoln Center. The African Film Festival (AFF) is a platform that aims to advance and enhance the understanding of African culture through film, with an annual film festival and year-round programming. Early in Reddy's career, she acted as an organizer for the 2001 YSS, the Youth Solidarity Summer program. The YSS is a "New York-based collective providing alternate education for South Asian American youth since 1997".

Reddy is also involved with the Taxi Workers Alliance, Salga, and Brecht Forum organizations.
