= South Asian Women's Creative Collective =

Regional women's cultural group

The South Asian Women’s Creative Collective (SAWCC) is a non-profit arts organization based in New York City. It supports emerging and established South Asian female artists and creative professionals by providing both physical and virtual spaces to showcase their works.

== History ==
SAWCC was founded in 1997 in New York City by American artist Jaishri Abichandani. It applied for non-profit status, becoming incorporated. In February 2000, an online list for South Asian women artists and creative professionals was created, which grew to include over 500 members.

SAWCC’s main writing workshop, Brown Eyed Girls, was initiated in 2002, and a studio circle for visual artists began in 2006. By 2012, SAWCC’s events were reaching an annual audience of over 5,000.

=== SAWCC programming ===
SAWCC hosts monthly events showcasing the work of South Asian women artists. These events include the Brown Eyed Girls writing workshop, a studio circle for visual artists, monthly panel discussions, and annual exhibitions and festivals open to the public. The annual visual arts exhibition has featured artists such as Chitra Ganesh, Swati Khurana, and Sa’dia Rehman, while the annual literary festival has included writers like Minal Hajratwala, V.V. Ganeshananthan, and Pulitzer Prize–winning novelist Jhumpa Lahiri. SAWCC serves as a platform for South Asian women artists to present their works, identify resources, and seek support, with a focus on themes of gender and cultural representation. The collective has collaborated with other arts organizations, including 3rd I South Asian Independent Film, the Asian American Writers’ Workshop, and the Pratt Institute.

=== Annual Visual Arts Exhibition (Select) ===
In 2007, SAWCC presented an art exhibition in New York titled (un) Suitable Girls, which celebrated young women who rejected traditional expectations such as arranged marriages and dowries. The exhibition highlighted the experiences of “messy, outspoken girls who might horrify prospective in-laws” with their Western ways, addressing themes of anger, angst, and societal norms.

In 2012, SAWCC’s 15th-year retrospective visual arts show received critical claims, including coverage in The New York Times.

== SAWCC London ==
While SAWCC is primarily based in New York City, it also has a sister chapter in London. SAWCC London offers free women-only “monthlies” as well as public events. These monthlies provide a platform for women artists of South Asian descent to network, share, discuss, and develop creative ideas and works.

== Notable members ==
Sources:

- Jaishri Abichandani
- Monica Jahan Bose
- DJ Rekha
- Yashica Dutt
- Chitra Ganesh
- V.V. Ganeshananthan
- Senain Khesghi
- Sarita Khurana
- Swati Khurana
- Yamini Nayar
- Prerana Reddy
- Shahzia Sikander
- Jasmine Wahi
