= Swati Khurana =

- Born: 1975 (age 50–51); New Delhi, India
- Education: Columbia University (BA), New York University (MA), Hunter College (MFA)
- Known for: Writing, embroidery, collage, drawing, installation, video
- Notable work: Texting Scrolls, Bridal Trousseau
- Movement: Contemporary art

Swati Khurana is a writer and contemporary artist of Indian-American origin. She was born in New Delhi, India in 1975. She emigrated to New York in 1977, where she lives and works. She graduated from Poughkeepsie Day School in 1993. She holds a B.A. in history from Columbia University, M.A. in Studio Art and Art Criticism from New York University, and an MFA in creative writing at Hunter College.

== Writing ==
Her fiction and essays have been published in The New York Times, Guernica, Chicago Quarterly Review, Asian American Literary Review, The Offing, The Rumpus, The Massachusetts Review, the Good Girls Marry Doctors anthology, and cited as a Notable Essay in Best American Essays 2019. She has received support from New York Foundation for the Arts, Vermont Studio Center, and Center for Fiction for her creative writing.

== Visual Art ==
Khurana works in embroidery, collage, drawing, and installation, exploring gender and rituals that are particular to Indian immigrant culture. Her videos have been described "delightful, wry" in The New York Times and "dreamy" in Time Out New York.

In the "Texting Scrolls" project, Khurana transcribes viewers' text messages into handmade scrolls. "Texting Scrolls" has been part of the Art in Odd Places festival, Kriti Festival at University of Illinois-Chicago, "A Bomb, With Ribbon Around It" exhibition at the Queens Museum, DUMBO Arts Festival, and Brooklyn Museum. For Parijat Desai Dance Company, Khurana co-designed projections for 'Songs to Live For' with Neeraj Churi, staged at Tribeca Performing Arts Center, where "eternally calm and august figures—exalted Mughal royalty—watch in painted silence as the dancers bring to life scenes of the age-old story of love and devotion."

In the essay "Seducing Structures and Stitches: Reappropriating Love, Desire and the Image," Uzma Rizvi wrote that "the stitched canvases of the 'Bridal Trousseau' series are both retro-feminist and very contemporary. Needlework, in itself, is a heavy referent within a postcolonial feminist context. These canvases are literally stitched images of the self."

== Exhibitions ==
Khurana has exhibited at the Smithsonian Institution, Exit Art, Zacheta National Gallery of Art (Warsaw), and with the South Asian Women's Creative Collective. About her solo exhibition at Chatterjee & Lal in Mumbai, she was "touted as one of the most promising young Indian artists in the international contemporary art scene."
