= Monica Jahan Bose =

Bangladeshi American artist and climate activist

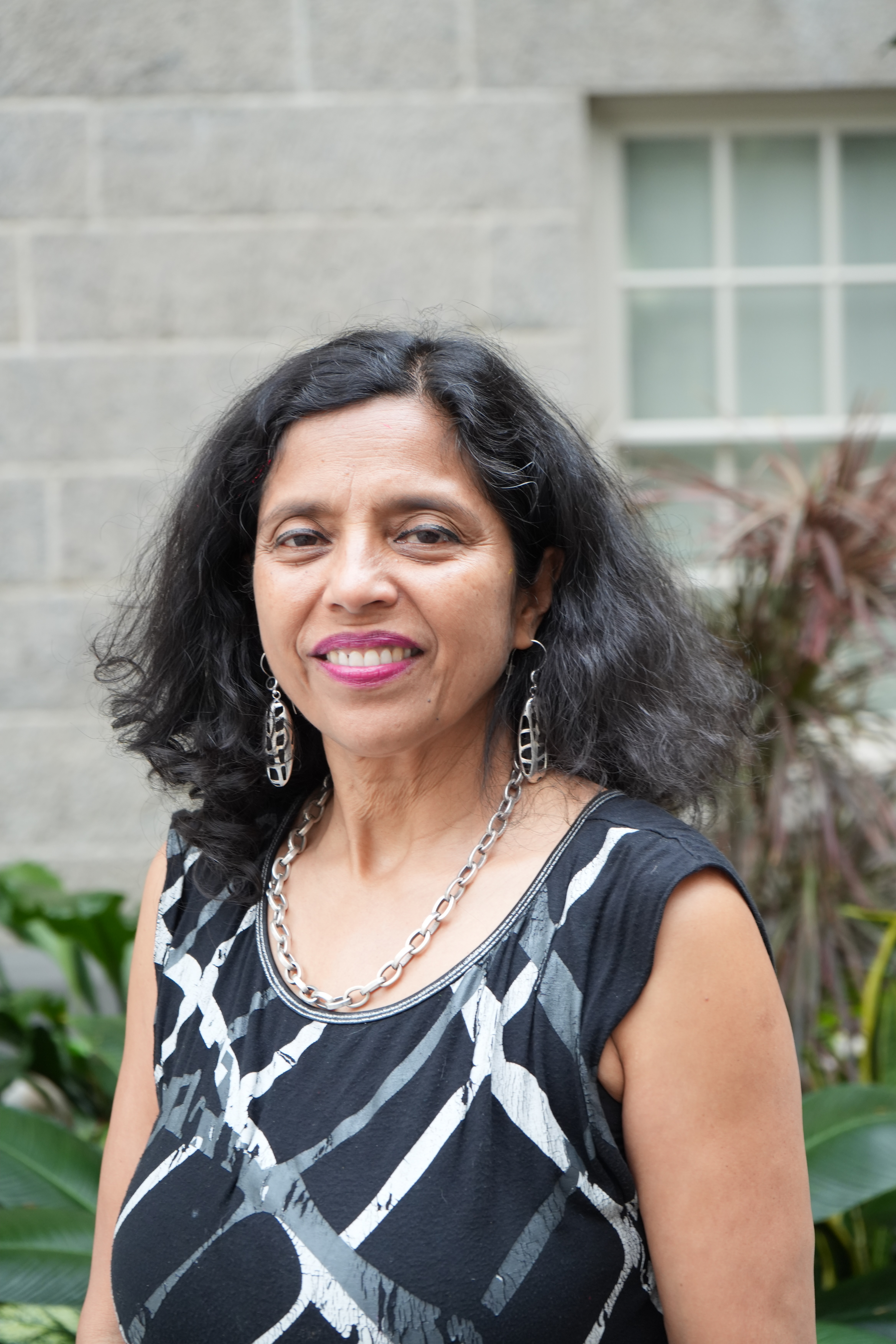
- Born: United Kingdom
- Education: Wesleyan University
- Occupations: Artist, environmental lawyer, climate activist

Monica Jahan Bose is a Bangladeshi American artist and climate activist. She is best known for her "Storytelling with Saris" project and has been granted numerous awards for her work.

== Early Life ==
Bose was born in Britain. Her ancestry is from Katakhali village on Barabaishdia Island in Bangladesh. Katakhali village is threatened by climate change due to rising seas and cyclones.

== Education ==
Bose has a Bachelor of Arts in the Practice of Art (Painting) from Wesleyan University, a Diploma in Art from Santiniketan, India, and a Juris Doctor from Columbia Law School.

== Career ==
Bose uses many different art forms including film, printmaking, painting, spoken word, and installations. Her art focuses primarily on women's experiences and the impacts from climate change.

In 2013, the Brentwood Arts Exchange displayed Bose's multimedia exhibit "Layer By Layer: Storytelling with Saris," which was created by Bose as a printmaking and story project that collaborating with women in Katakhali. Filmmaker Nandita Ahmed created a documentary on Bose's work in Katakhali that was also on display at the exhibit. Since 2015, Bose has hosted Sari Climate Pledge Workshops, which consisted of making saris with women and some men in the United States, France and Greece.

In 2017, Bose's work "Hawa" was featured in the Villa Terrace Decorative Arts Museum's exhibit "Ornate/Activate" alongside the work of Vandana Jain and Zainab Hussain. The exhibit focused on artists from the South Asian Women's Creative Collective, which Bose served as a member of the board of directors. In 2018, her exhibit "Weather the Storm" was on display at the Civilian Art Projects, in Washington D.C. Bose's 2018–2019 exhibit "WRAPture" was on display and consisted of 65 eighteen-foot-long saris being hung from 5 buildings, including the Anacostia Arts Center. "WRAPture" focused on connecting communities and starting a discussion around climate change by included saris decorated by women in Katakhali and saris decorated by residents of Anacostia. From May to June 2019, Bose had her exhibit "Seven Minutes on the B67" displayed at the Open Source Gallery in Brooklyn. "Seven Minutes on the B67" focused on connecting Brooklyn's South Slope to Bangladeshi immigrants in the Kensington neighborhood and is part of Bose's ongoing Storytelling with Saris art and advocacy project.

From 2020 to 2022, Bose has been awarded $175,000 by the D.C. Commission of the Arts & Humanities through the Public Art Building Communities (PABC) grant program to supports the creation and installation of permanent or temporary public artwork that enhances District neighborhoods. In 2022, Bose was one of the grant recipients for the Washington Project for the Arts (WPA) Wherewithal Grants funding cycle and was awarded $5000 for her projects.

On 17 November 2022, Bose and designer Hina Puamohala Kneubuhl participated in a webinar called "In the Pandemic's Wake: Social Change and Reflection with Asian American and Pacific Islander Leaders” that was hosted by the Smithsonian Asian Pacific American Center. The webinar focused on how Bose's and Kneubuhl's work engaged with discussions of climate change, social justice, and women's rights in addition to how the COVID-19 pandemic affected the artistic practices and communities. Her work has appeared in the Miami Herald, the Washington Post, Art Asia Pacific, the Milwaukee Sentinel, the Honolulu Star Advertiser, the Japan Times, and all major newspapers in Bangladesh.
