= Jasmine Wahi =

American educator and author

- Born: 1986 (age 39–40); Washington, D.C., United States
- Education: New York University
- Occupations: Curator; educator; activist
- Employers: School of Visual Arts; Bronx Museum of the Arts

Jasmine Wahi (born 1986) is a South Asian American curator, educator, and activist. Her work focuses on issues of femme empowerment, complicating binary structures within social discourses, and exploring multi-positional cultural identities through the lens of intersectional feminism. In addition to running Project for Empty Space, in Newark, NJ and curating international shows independently, Wahi teaches at the School of Visual Arts in New York, and is currently the Holly Block Social Justice Curator of the Bronx Museum of the Arts. Wahi is a former board member of the South Asian Women's Creative Collective (SAWCC).

== Early life and education ==
Jasmine Wahi was born in Washington, D.C. in 1986. She spent her childhood in Washington, where her parents still reside. Wahi was exposed to curation at an early age through her aunt who worked as a curator for the Smithsonian. This piqued Wahi's interest in curation early on. Wahi attended Sidwell Friends School, graduating in 2004. Wahi attended New York University from 2004 to 2008, receiving a BA in Art History and South Asian Studies. She received her master's degree at from New York University's Institute of Fine Arts in Art History, Criticism and Conservation.

== Work ==
In 2008 Wahi opened her own consultancy, which focused primarily on cultivating emerging artists in a largely competitive marketplace. Since it first opened, Jasmine Wahi Contemporary has grown beyond an advisory service to include curatorial projects and non-profit endeavors. Curatorial work primarily focuses on social narratives, such as feminism, individualism, sexuality and sexual orientation, and personal flaws and achievements.

In 2010, Jasmine Wahi co-founded Project For Empty Space with Meenakshi Thirukode, a non-profit arts organization in New York City dedicated to bringing contemporary art to a multitude of communities through the utilization of abandoned and unusual urban spaces.

In 2011, Project For Empty Space expanded its programming to other parts of the world, including Bogota, Colombia, Vancouver, Canada, and Toronto, Canada.

In 2013, Wahi and Project For Empty Space began a long-term partnership with Rebecca Jampol of Solo(s) Project House, to create a series of pop-up exhibitions under the moniker "Gateway Project Spaces," which then became Gateway Projects.

In March 2015, Wahi co-created and became the co-director of The Gateway Project and Gallery. Gateway connects to people passing through the space concourse with a series of small art window displays and installations by six artists in a rotating program.

In 2019 she was elected the Co-Chair of The Feminist Art Projects.

In January 2020, Wahi co-curated Abortion Is Normal, a two-part emergency exhibition co-organized by Marilyn Minter, Gina Nanni, Laurie Simmons, and Sandy Tait. The exhibition featured works by around 40 female artists, among them Marilyn Minter, Carrie Mae Weems, Nan Goldin, Cindy Sherman, Barbara Kruger, Viva Ruiz, Shirin Neshat and Natalie Frank.

In February 2020 to April 2022, Wahi was the Holly Block Social Justice Curator of the Bronx Museum of the Arts. The position was named after the death of Holly Block, a prominent figure in the New York art world and long-time advocate for the Bronx.
