= Nathan Sawaya =

American artist (born 1973)

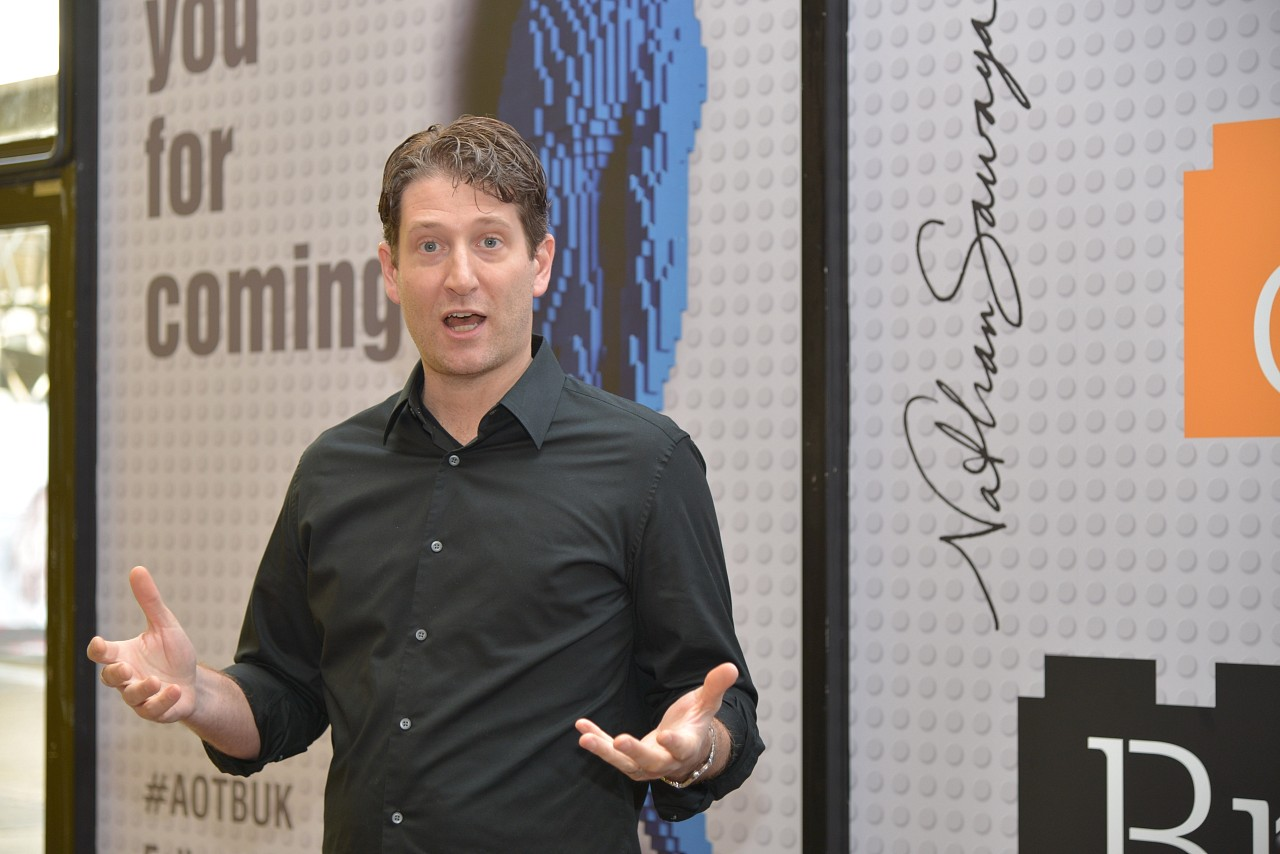
- Sawaya at his Art of the Brick exhibition in London in 2014
- Born: July 10, 1973 (age 53); Colville, Washington, United States
- Occupation: Artist
- Website: https://www.nathansawaya.com/

Nathan Sawaya (born July 10, 1973) is an American artist known for creating sculptures and large-scale mosaics using Lego building bricks.

== Biography ==
Born in Colville, Washington and raised in Veneta, Oregon, Sawaya attended New York University, where he earned bachelor's and law degrees, eventually practicing law at the firm Winston & Strawn in New York.

In 2004, Sawaya left his job as an attorney to work as a full-time Lego artist.

Less than six months after working for the Lego Group, he branched off and opened an art studio in New York City in 2004. As a professional artist, Sawaya is not an employee of the toy company. Sawaya is officially recognized by The Lego Group as a Lego Certified Professional.

Sawaya's creations include a 7-foot (2.1 m) replica of the Brooklyn Bridge, a life-size model of a Tyrannosaurus rex, and a 6-foot (1.8 m) sculpture of Han Solo frozen in carbonite.His works include human form sculptures titled 'Yellow,' 'Red,' and 'Blue' .

He had his first solo art exhibit in the Spring of 2007 at the Lancaster Museum of Art. "The Art of the Brick" focuses exclusively on the use of Lego building blocks as an art medium and has been exhibited in various museums.

Sawaya had his first exhibition in the Southern Hemisphere at Federation Square in Melbourne, Australia in June 2011. The exhibition since traveled around Australia, including stops in Adelaide and at the Sydney Town Hall.

In July 2012, Sawaya's Asian tour began with exhibitions in Taipei, Kaohsiung, and Taichung. He has also exhibited at the world famous Art Science Museum at Marina Bay Sands in Singapore (November 2012 - May 2013) and Discovery Times Square in New York City (June 2013 - current). His exhibitions have been popular, with high attendance in various locations.

== Collections/Installations ==
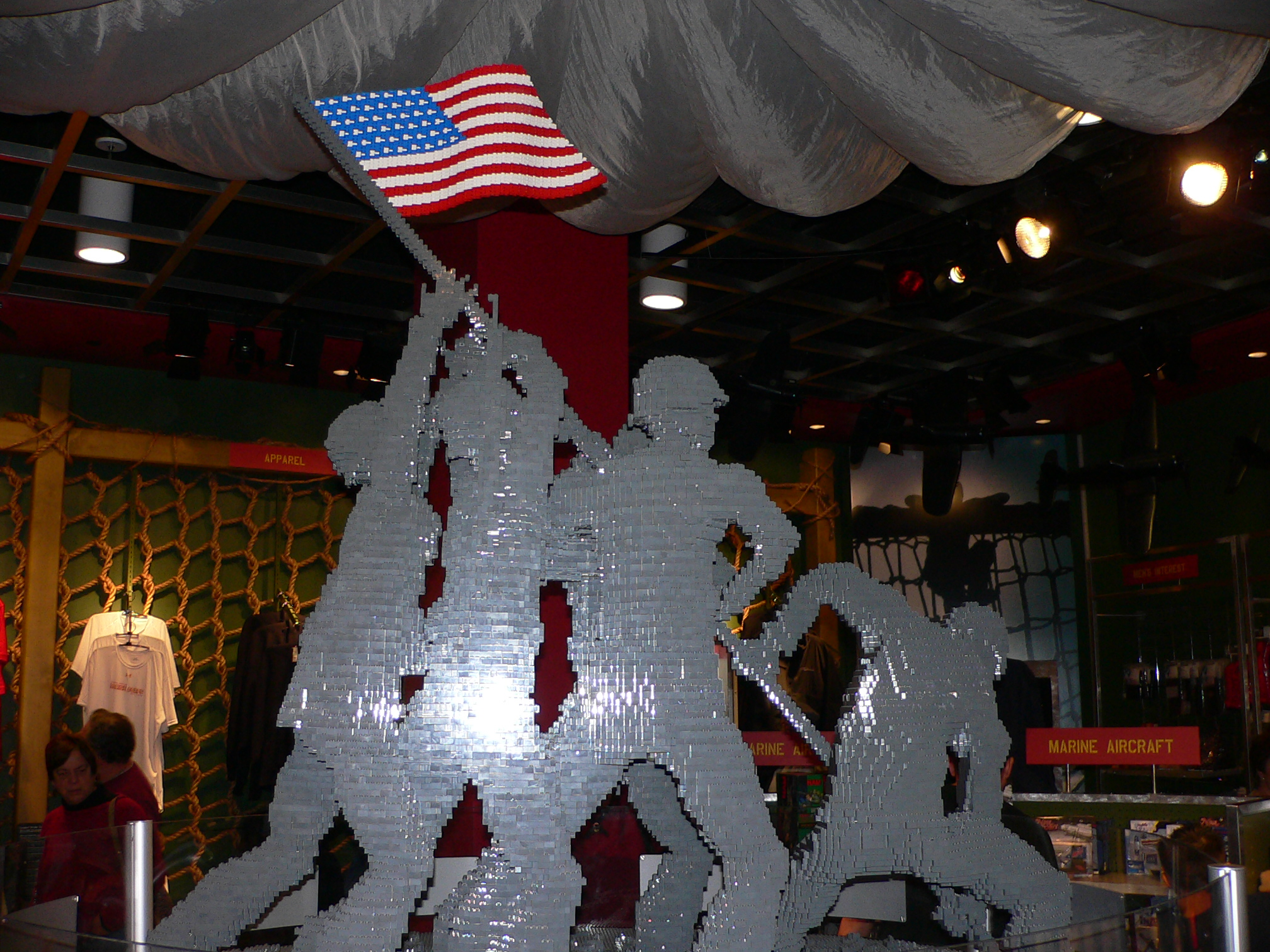
Raising the Flag on Iwo Jima reproduced in Lego form by Nathan Sawaya. On display in the National Museum of the Marine Corps and Heritage Center gift shop

Nathan Sawaya's work is in many collections, including:

- The Strong National Museum of Play in Rochester, New York
- Time Warner Center public art display in New York, New York
- The National Museum of the Marine Corps in Quantico, Virginia
- The New Orleans Public Library public art display in New Orleans, Louisiana
- MASS MoCA in North Adams, Massachusetts

And has been featured at museum venues worldwide, including:

- The Imperial Centre for the Arts & Sciences in Downtown Rocky Mount, North Carolina.
- Kimball Art Center in Park City, Utah
- John F. Kennedy Center in Washington, DC
- Oregon Museum of Science and Industry in Portland, Oregon
- Nassau County Museum of Art in Roslyn Harbor, New York
- Morris Museum in Morristown, New Jersey
- Clinton Library in Little Rock, Arkansas
- Mesa Contemporary Arts Center in Mesa, Arizona
- Narrows Center for the Arts in Fall River, Massachusetts
- Mulvane Art Museum in Topeka, Kansas
- Crisp Museum in Cape Girardeau, Missouri
- Columbus Museum of Art in Columbus, Ohio
- Art & Culture Center of Hollywood, Florida
- The Ambassador Theatre in Dublin, Ireland
- The Loading Bay Gallery in London, United Kingdom
- Telus World of Science in Edmonton, Alberta, Canada

== Press ==
Sawaya has also been featured on multiple media outlets including The Colbert Report, where he presented Stephen Colbert with a life-sized replica of Stephen Colbert; CBS's The Late Show with David Letterman; NBC's Today show; TBS's Conan; ABC's Jimmy Kimmel Live!; Newsweek; the Los Angeles Times; The Hollywood Reporter; CNN; and The Wall Street Journal. In April 2009, he was a consultant on MythBusters. He also served as a consulting producer on the American version of Lego Masters, helping to design sets and challenges.
