= East–West Center =

Organization established by U.S. Congress in Hawaii

Coordinates: 21.296911°N 157.81476°W

East-West Center
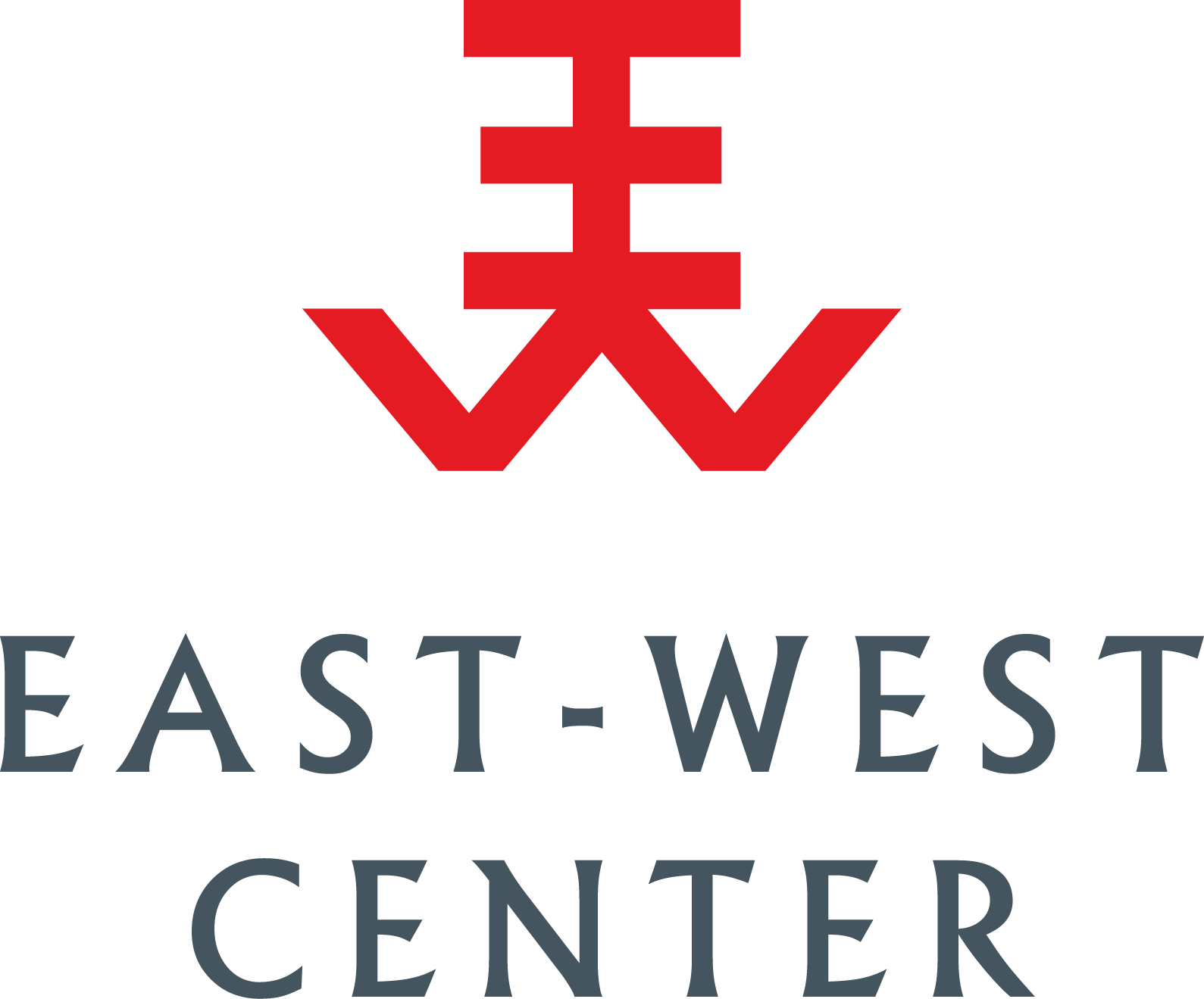
- Formation: 1960; 66 years ago
- Purpose: Promotes better relations and understanding among the people and nations of the U.S., Asia, & the Pacific
- Location(s): 1601 East-West Road; Honolulu, HI 96848
- President: Celeste Connors
- Founder: Murray Turnbull
- Budget: $25 million
- Website: eastwestcenter.org

The East–West Center (EWC), or the Center for Cultural and Technical Interchange Between East and West, is an education and research organization established by the U.S. Congress in 1960 to strengthen relations and understanding among the peoples and nations of Asia, the Pacific, and the United States as part of Cold War diplomatic efforts.

Celeste Connors has served as the Center’s president and chief executive since July 1, 2025, where it is headquartered in Honolulu at the University of Hawaiʻi at Mānoa.

== History ==
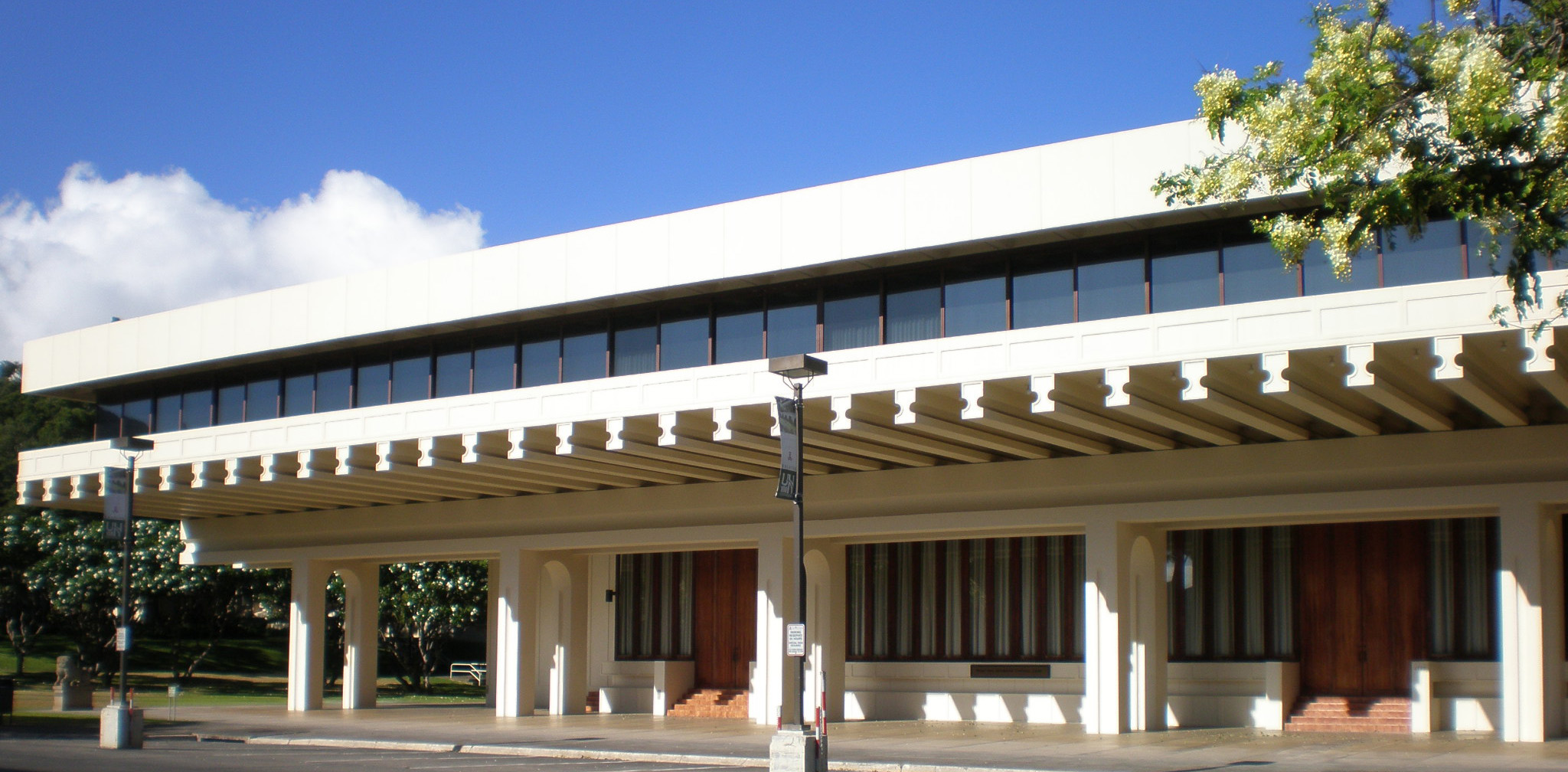
Jefferson Hall Conference Center

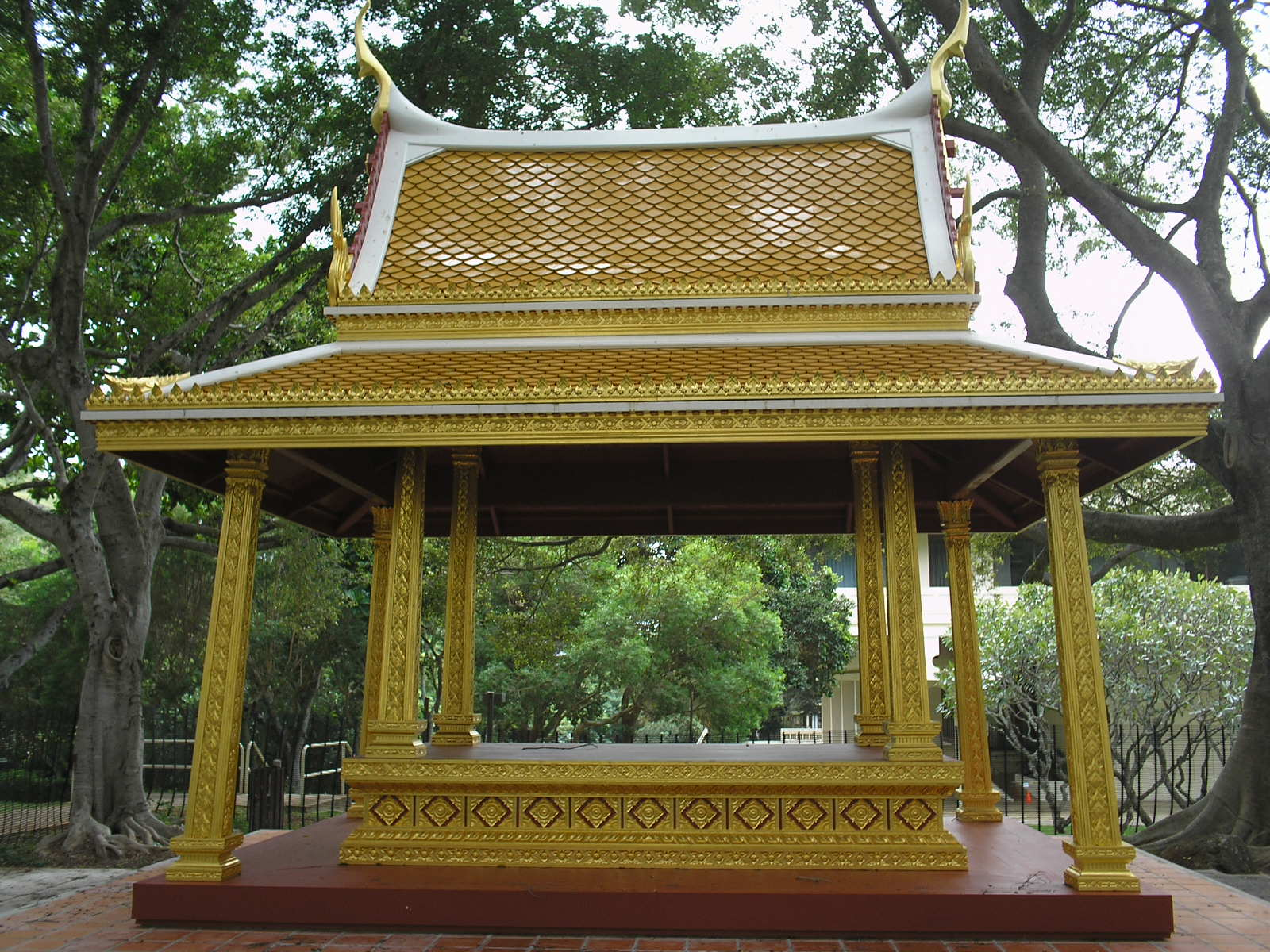
Thai Pavilion

The East-West Center was established to facilitate Cold War-era diplomacy between the United States and its allies through technical interchange. Hawaii had become an important site for U.S. cultural diplomacy, military training, research, and as a staging ground for the U.S. war in Vietnam. In its early stages, the East-West Center only admitted students from countries deemed friendly to the United States.

"The East–West Center originated as a University of Hawaiʻi at Mānoa faculty initiative with a February 16, 1959, memo from professor Murray Turnbull, then acting Dean of the College of Arts and Sciences, to political science professor Norman Meller, then chairperson of the faculty senate, that proposed the creation of an International College of Cultural Affairs. However, University of Hawaiʻi President Laurence H. Snyder stated that budgetary constraints prevented proceeding at the time with the idea".

Two months later, following radio reports of an April 16, 1959 speech in Washington, D.C. by then Senator Lyndon Johnson (D-Texas) that proposed the creation of an international university in Hawaii "as a meeting place for the intellectuals of the East and the West," history professor John Stalker and Meller urged President Snyder to respond at once to Johnson's suggestion. With the prospect of federal funding, President Snyder appointed a faculty committee chaired by Turnbull to rapidly prepare a substantive proposal for creating an international college.

On June 9, 1959, Senator Johnson introduced a bill in the U.S. Senate to establish an educational center in Hawaii to provide for "cultural and technical interchange between East and West," with a companion bill introduced in the U.S. House by Delegate John A. Burns (D-T.H.); the Mutual Security Act of 1959, a renewal of the original Mutual Security Act, signed by U.S. President Eisenhower on July 24, 1959, called on the State Department to study the idea and report back to Congress by January 3, 1960.

On May 14, 1960, President Eisenhower signed the Mutual Security Act of 1960 which authorized the creation of a Center for Cultural and Technical Interchange Between East and West (East–West Center) at the University of Hawaiʻi, and on August 31, 1960, signed the Department of State Appropriation Act, 1961, which appropriated $10 million for the center (including $8.2 million in capital spending for six new buildings), and on September 30, 1961, President Kennedy signed Supplemental Appropriation Act, 1962, which appropriated an additional $3.3 million for the center.

On October 25, 1960, the University of Hawaiʻi signed a grant-in-aid agreement with the State Department to establish and operate the East–West Center, and received its first installment of $1.1 million in federal funding on November 8, 1960.

From its founding, the East-West Center's oversight from, and relationship with, the federal government resulted in scrutiny and disagreements. Among those favoring strong federal control was Congressman John Rooney, who in 1962 criticized the East-West Center for what he described as "not properly screening applicants" and thereby allowing "left wing foul balls" into the program." The East-West Center was staffed with U.S. diplomats and foreign service staff. According to academic Wendy Cheng, the Center's assistant director for American Studies was widely believed to monitor the center for "lefties" and "reds".

On May 9, 1961, then U.S. vice president Lyndon Johnson was a guest at groundbreaking ceremonies for the East–West Center's first six buildings. Five of the new buildings, designed by architect I. M. Pei, were built along the new East–West Road where a new 21-acre (85,000 m^{2}) East–West Center campus just west of Manoa Stream on the east side of the university campus replaced chicken coops, temporary wooden buildings for faculty housing, and the Hawaii Agricultural Experiment Station. A sixth building built under the federal grant for the East–West Center was Edmondson Hall, designed by architect Albin Kubala and built on McCarthy Mall.

Four of the six buildings were completed and opened in September 1962: Edmondson Hall (a four-story building containing classrooms and laboratories), Kennedy Theatre (an 800-seat theatre), Hale Kuahine (a four-story women's dormitory for 120 students), and Lincoln Hall (a four-story residence hall for senior scholars and faculty). The other two buildings: Jefferson Hall (a four-story conference center, cafeteria, and administrative office building) and Hale Manoa (a 13-story men's dormitory for 480 students) were completed and opened in September 1963. "Seien" (Serene Garden), a Japanese garden designed by Kenzo Ogata of Tokyo, and located behind Jefferson Hall, was a 1963 gift of Japanese business leaders; the Japanese tea house Chashitsu Jakuan (Cottage of Tranquility) in the garden was presented to the university in 1972 by Sen Sōshitsu, the 15th-generation grand tea master of the Urasenke Foundation.

In May 1967, the Thai Pavilion, a gift of King Bhumibol Adulyadej and Queen Sirikit of Thailand in 1964, was assembled just in time for King Adulyadej's dedication of the pavilion on June 6, 1967; it is located between Lincoln Hall and Jefferson Hall, in front of Hale Kuahine.

In 1968, recent East-West Center student Chen Yu-hsi was arrested by the Republic of China's (ROC) Kuomintang (KMT) government based on KMT surveillance of Chen in the United States. The Taiwan Garrison Command alleged that he had read communist literature including works by Mao Zedong while at the East-West Center library. The East-West Center administration and student associations sent an observer to Chen's July 1968 trial where he was convicted of sedition and sentenced to seven years of imprisonment. Over the course of his incarceration, students protested at the University of Hawaiʻi campus, the ROC consulate, and the East-West Center Chancellor's office. Chen was released in 1971 after receiving amnesty.

In 1969, the four-story wing of Moore Hall designed by architect Hideo Murakami was built with East–West Center federal funds on the west side of East–West Road across from Lincoln Hall. Harlan Cleveland was president of the University of Hawaiʻi. During 1969-1974, the university added a medical school, a law school and an international astronomy project.

In 1970, the East-West Center Students Association responded to the U.S. invasion of Cambodia by endorsing a general strike by the university community and issuing a statement condemning the U.S. escalation, which the association described as demonstrating the contradictions between the East-West Center's stated goals and U.S. foreign policy.

In 1977, John A. Burns Hall, located south of Hale Manoa on the 21-acre (85,000 m^{2}) East–West Center campus, was completed. The four-story building for administrative offices was designed by architect John Hara to integrate with the style of the other East–West Center buildings (its windows mimic those of Lincoln Hall). It was built with State of Hawaii funds to compensate the federal government for the university's use of Edmondson Hall, the Kennedy Theatre, and the 4-story wing of Moore Hall, which had been built with federal funds for the East–West Center.

== Structure ==
EWC program areas include Education, Research, Seminars, a Washington, D.C. office, an Office of External Affairs and the East–West Center Foundation.

=== Chancellors ===
University of Hawaiʻi art professor Murray Turnbull served as interim director and acting chancellor of the East–West Center through 1961, when anthropologist Alexander Spoehr, the former director (1953–1961) of the Bernice Pauahi Bishop Museum in Honolulu, was appointed as the East–West Center's first chancellor, serving for two years before resigning at the end of 1963. University of Hawaiʻi president Thomas H. Hamilton served as acting chancellor of the East–West Center for a year and a half from January 1964–June 1965. In July 1965, he was succeeded by former newspaper publisher and diplomat Howard P. Jones, the former U.S. ambassador to Indonesia (1958–1965), who served as chancellor for three years before being succeeded in August 1968 by linguist Everett Kleinjans, the former vice president of International Christian University in Tokyo, who had lived in Asia for sixteen years.

The first Native Hawaiian woman to become a general officer in the U.S. military, Major General Suzanne Vares-Lum, was appointed as president of East-West Center in 2021, becoming its first woman and the first Native Hawaiian to lead the organization since its founding.

=== Research Program ===
The Research Program conducts studies on economic development, trade, energy, governance, politics, security, conflict reduction, population, health, and environment. Under the Research umbrella is the Pacific Islands Development Program (the research and training arm and regional secretariat of the Pacific Islands Conference of Leaders representing 22 Pacific island nations).

=== Education Program ===
The Education Program offers educational opportunities for students and professional development seminars and workshops for educators from the U.S. and the region. The Student Program is carried out in partnership with the University of Hawaiʻi and other universities in Hawaii and the continental U.S. scholarships are awarded annually in an international competition. Also under the Education Program are the Asia Pacific Leadership Program (APLP) (a certificate program for graduate-level students and mid-level professionals), AsiaPacificEd and the Asian Studies Development Program (both work with primary, secondary, and college educators to infuse Asian Pacific content in curricula), and Education 2020 (a focus on new approaches to educational challenges in the Asia Pacific Region). Most of education program participants reside in EWC dormitories like Hale Manoa Dormitory.

=== East–West Seminars ===
East–West Seminars bring professionals from government, civil society, business and the media together for short-term dialogue and exchange programs to share knowledge and address issues of regional and global concern. Included in the Seminars Program are the Media Program (provides journalist with first-hand examination of issues in the region and the U.S.), Senior Policy Seminar (brings together top level foreign affairs and security officials, private sector and civil society leaders to discuss key regional issues), and the Asia Pacific Executive Forum (brings to American cities discussions on topics that affect the economics and business of the region). The East–West Center also organizes various women empowerment programs. It recently organized 2014 Changing Faces Women's Leadership Seminar at Hawaii which saw the participation of 13 women entrepreneurs from the Asia Pacific Region.

=== Office of External Affairs ===
The Office of External Affairs (OEA) connects the resources and research of the EWC with the local, national, and international community through educational outreach, public programs, briefings, and media relations. Within the OEA is the News and Information office (provides EWC research findings, opinion pieces, and analysis of issues to journalists and the public), the Arts Program (presents performances and exhibitions illuminating the cultural values and art forms of national and ethnic traditions in the region), and the Alumni Office (works with an international network of professionals from more than 50 countries who have had a past affiliation with the EWC).

The Hawaii International Film Festival was founded in 1981 as an outreach project of the East-West Center. Due to this association, HIFF prominently featured academic seminars and discussions in its early years, consisting of seven films from six countries which were viewed by an audience of 5,000 in its inaugural year.

Although the festival decided to move independently of the East-West Center 1994, it still continues in its mission to elevate Asian and Indigenous voices in film, screening 300 films from 35 countries in 2022, and currently attracts more than 50,000 viewers annually from throughout the Asia-Pacific region and beyond.

=== East–West Center Foundation ===
The East–West Center Foundation expands and enhances support for the EWC with private resources that support scholarships, research, and seminar initiatives not covered by core Congressional funding.

== Funding ==
Approximately half of Center funding comes from the U.S. government, with additional support provided by private agencies, individuals, foundations, corporations, and the governments of the region. In 2005 the EWC received a total of $37 million (including $19.2 million from the U.S. Congress).

On May 7, 2009, President Barack Obama requested a reduction in federal funding for the EWC, from $21 million in fiscal year 2009 to $12 million for fiscal year 2010. The outcome of the 2010 request was a $2 million increase in the center's budget. Subsequently, in 2011, a request to reduce the budget by 50% (reduction by $10.7 million) was placed as part of the budget proposal. The outcome of this request was a $2 million decrease in the center's budget.

Increased climate and geopolitical tensions within the region has raised the profile of the institution after years of declining budget approproations, with a return to federal funding in excess of $20 million under President Biden.

== East–West Center Gallery ==
The East–West Center Gallery presents changing exhibits of traditional and contemporary arts of the Pacific region. The gallery is located on the campus of the University of Hawaiʻi, and is open daily except Saturday. Cultural performances are also presented.

== Hale Manoa Dormitory ==
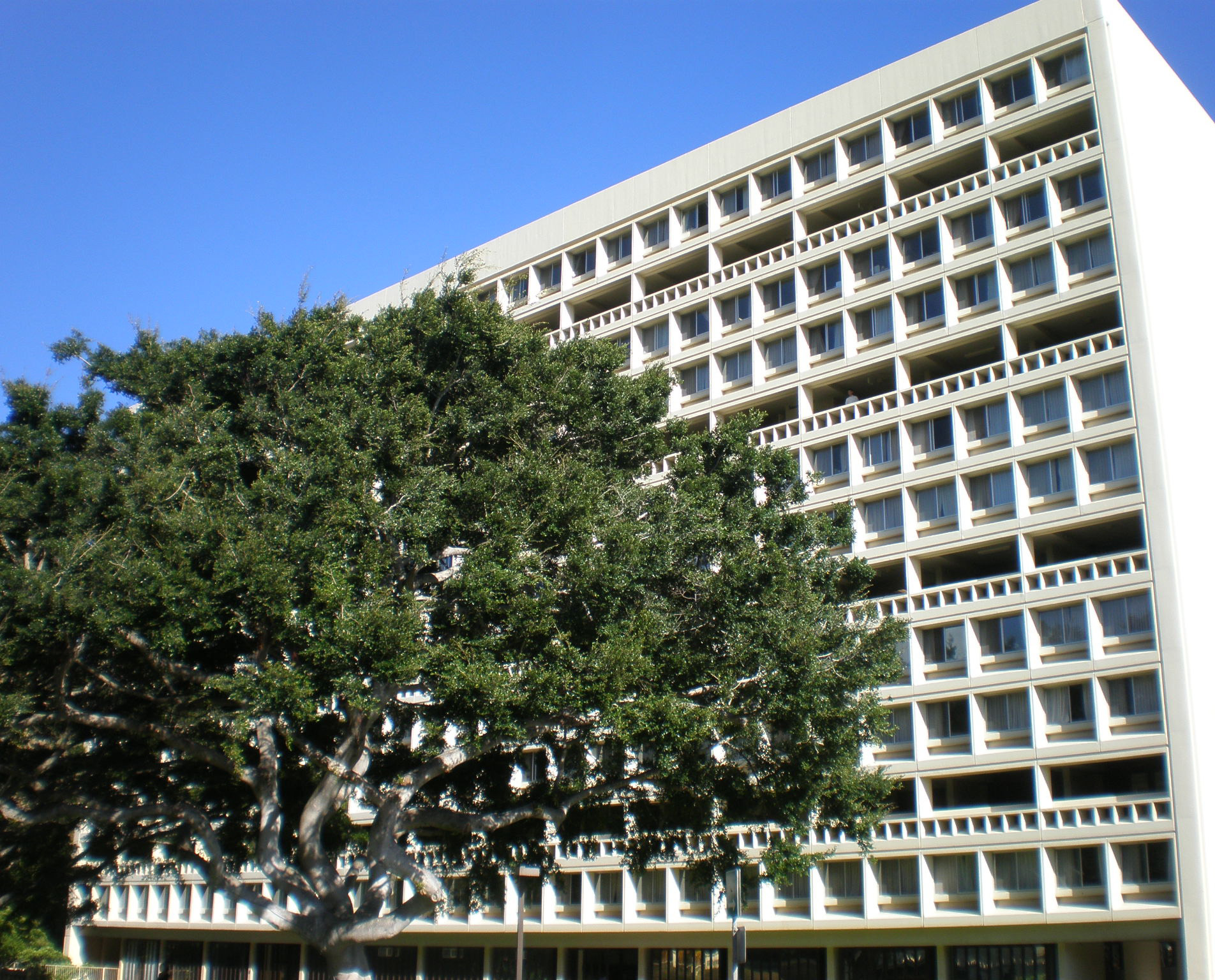
Hale Manoa Dormitory

Hale Manoa is the East–West Center's student dormitory. This 13-story building, constructed in 1962, was designed by American architect I. M. Pei, and is located in the University of Hawaiʻi, Honolulu. The dormitory has a housing capacity of more than 400. This is a predominantly graduate student dormitory and most of the residents are mainly recipients of East West Center scholarships or are affiliated with their programs. Hence here there are EWC graduate degree fellows, Asia Pacific Leadership Program participants, EWC affiliates and others who are not directly funded by the EWC. A most of the residents are international students from the Asia-Pacific region like China, Japan, Thailand, Vietnam, The Philippines, and Indonesia.

It was an all-male dormitory, whereas a sister dormitory, Hale Kuahine, situated just next to the Imin Center and also a I. M. Pei building, housed all the females. Currently, both Hale Manoa and Hale Kuahine are unisex dormitories.
