= Murray Turnbull =

American artist and art educator

Murray Turnbull (1919–2014) was an American visual artist and arts educator. He is known as the founder of the East–West Center in Honolulu.

== Life and career ==
It Looked as if a Night of Dark Intent was Coming by Murray Turnbull, 1992, Hawaii State Art Museum

Murray Turnbull was born in Sibley, Iowa. He received a BFA degree from the University of Nebraska in 1941, and an MA from the University of Denver in 1949.

In 1954, he began teaching at the University of Hawaii In 1959, while acting dean of the university's College of Arts and Sciences, Turnbull first proposed an "international college" for all the peoples of Asia and the Pacific. The idea was advanced by Hawaii's delegate to the U.S. House of Representatives (and later governor) John A. Burns, who, with the help of Senate Majority Leader Lyndon B. Johnson, obtained federal funding for an international university in Hawaii, now known as the East–West Center. Turnbull retired from the University of Hawaii as a professor emeritus in 1985.

Although a modernist, Turnbull is known for his brightly colored figurative paintings. It Looked as if a Night of Dark Intent was Coming from 1992, is an example of the artist's distinctly modern approach to figurative art. In addition to paintings, Turnbull designed the following public art:

- Four-story stained glass windows for Keller Hall at the University of Hawaii at Manoa, 1958
- Four concrete sculpture walls for the Music Building at the University of Hawaii at Manoa, 1975
- A forty-foot mural for Wahiawa Intermediate School, 1975
- A fifty-foot mural on the exterior wall of Kokua Market in Moiliili, Hawaii, 2001
