= The Art of the Brick =

Travelling exposition of Lego sculptures

- Status: active
- Genre: traveling Lego sculpture exhibit
- Years active: 19
- Inaugurated: 2007
- Founder: Nathan Sawaya
- Leader: Nathan Sawaya
- Website: theartofthebrickexpo.com

The Art of the Brick is a traveling exposition of sculptures made by Nathan Sawaya using Lego building bricks. It premiered in 2007 and as of 25 April 2024 continues to hold exhibitions around the world.

== Exhibitions ==
The Art of the Brick exclusively features sculptures made by Nathan Sawaya using Lego building bricks. Each exhibition typically features over 100 sculptures. Many have references to old classical art, which has been given a twist from the usual paint on a canvas to a popular kids toy that showcases creativity using bricks.

Each sculpture has between approximately 4,000 to 80,000 Lego building bricks.

Some of the sculptures displayed include:

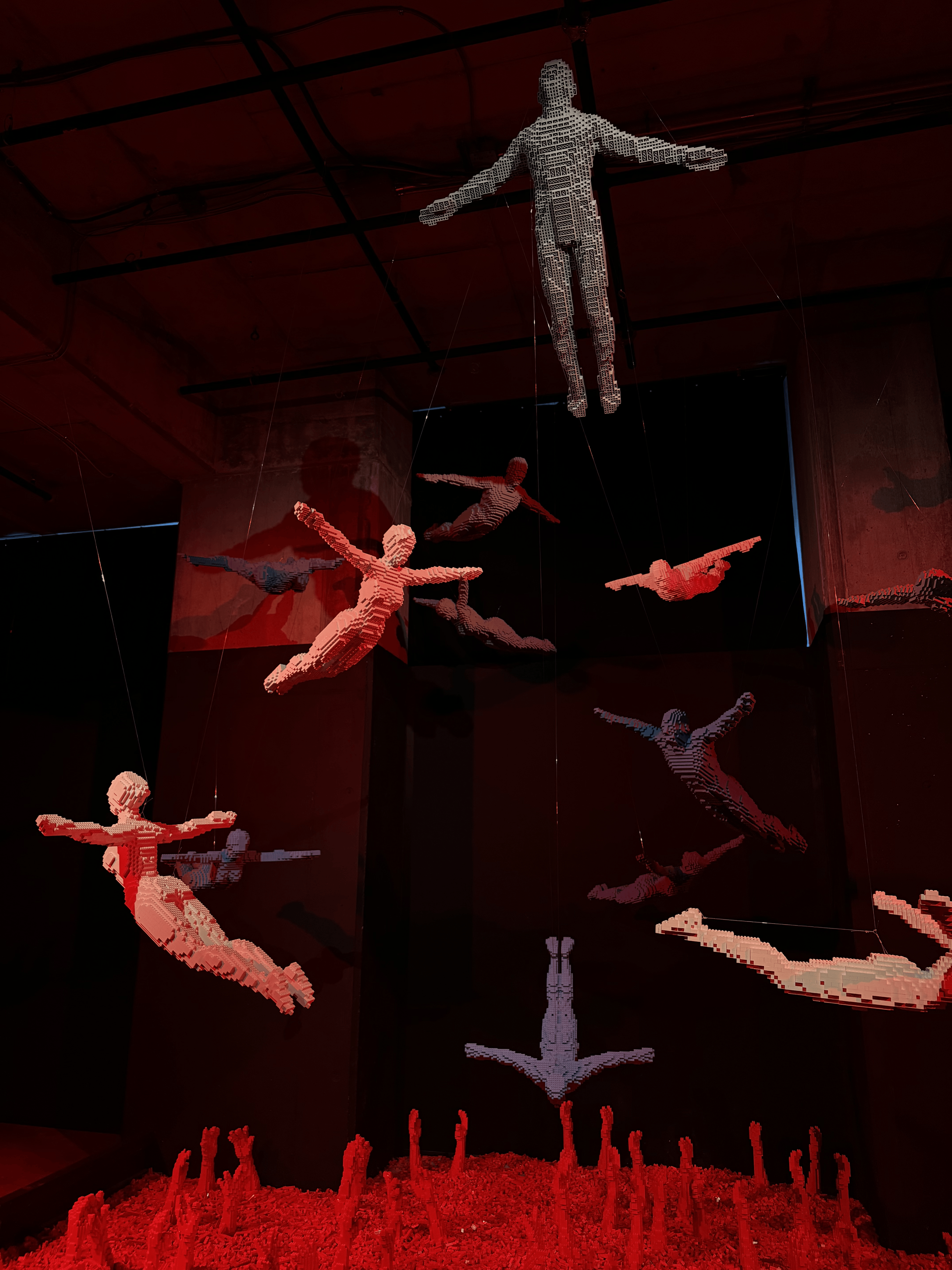
Latest Montreal exposition
- Flyboy
- The Kiss (which uses 18,893 Lego building bricks)
- My Boy (which uses 22,590 Lego building bricks)
- Pop-up Book (which uses 19,822 Lego building bricks)
- Skulls
- The Swimmer (which uses 10,980 Lego building bricks)
- Yellow

The exhibition also sometimes includes collections of photography by Dean West with sculptures by Sawaya integrated into the photos.

== History ==
The Art of the Brick first premiered in 2007. It is the first traveling art exhibition to focus exclusively on sculptures made using LEGO building bricks.

Since 2007, it has toured through over 80 cities and been to each populated continent.

The locations it has been exhibited include:

- The Franklin Institute, Philadelphia
- California Science Center, Los Angeles
- Federation Square, Melbourne
- Hamburg
- Art and Culture Center of Hollywood
- Israel
- Lyon
- Museum of Science and Industry, Chicago
- New York City
- Norway
- Pacific Science Center, Seattle
- Paris
- San Francisco
- Singapore
- Taiwan
- Tampa
- Tokyo
- Zürich

== Recognition ==
In 2011, CNN named it a Top 10 Must-See Global Exhibition.

== See also ==
- A Lego Brickumentary
- The Brick Testament
