= Art and Culture Center of Hollywood =

Hollywood Art and Culture Center

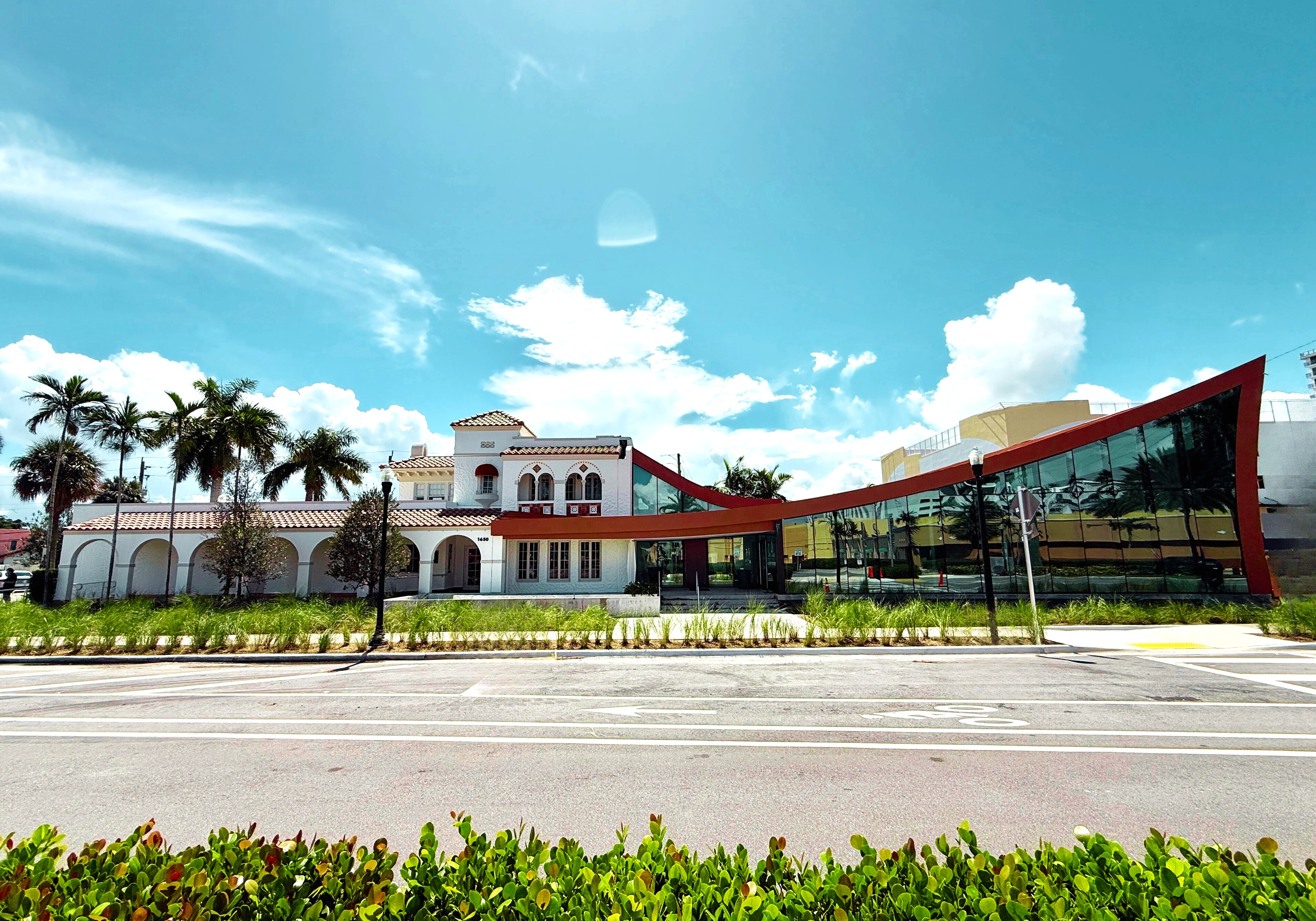

- Location within Florida
- Established: 1975
- Location: 1650 Harrison Street, Hollywood, Florida, United States
- Coordinates: 26.010437°N 80.140669°W
- Type: Art museum
- Director: Jennifer Homan
- Website: www.artandculturecenter.org

The Hollywood Art and Culture Center is a private 501c3 multidisciplinary arts organization located in Hollywood, Florida. Founded in 1975, the center presents contemporary visual art exhibitions, film programming, live performances, and arts education initiatives serving South Florida. Its main campus is located in the ArtsPark at Young Circle and includes exhibition galleries, a performing arts space, and educational facilities. The organization also operates Cinema Paradiso, a regional art-house cinema showcasing independent, international, and classic films. The ACCH is the third oldest arts nonprofit in Broward County.

== History ==
The Hollywood Art and Culture Center of Hollywood was founded in 1975. It was originally based in a small community space on 1301 S. Drive in Hollywood Beach. The grand opening of the new Hollywood Arts Hub education and events wing took place in the same year as the 50th anniversary for the City of Hollywood.

In 1992, the Center moved to the recently renovated Kagey Home, which had been built in 1924. In 1999, the Center took on the management for the City of Hollywood of the 500-seat Hollywood Central Performing Arts Center (HCPAC) in the separate location of the downtown district of the city.

In 2020, the Center launched the Open Dialogues film series "to promote acceptance and inclusion in our community through documentary film shorts and other programming".

== Programs ==
The Hollywood Art and Culture Center of presents a range of arts programming including rotating visual art exhibitions, film screenings, educational workshops, and live performances.

=== Exhibitions ===
The Center hosts contemporary visual art exhibitions featuring regional, national, and international artists across multiple galleries.

=== Education ===
The organization offers arts education programs for youth and adults, including classes, workshops, summer camps, and community outreach initiatives.

=== Cinema Paradiso ===
Cinema Paradiso is the Center’s independent film theater located in downtown Hollywood. The Cinema presents independent, international, documentary, and repertory films, along with filmmaker discussions and special screenings.

=== Performing Arts ===
The Center’s theater space hosts concerts, lectures, comedy performances, and multidisciplinary arts events.

== Notable exhibitions ==
- Sunshine & Ink: Florida Printmakers (2026)
- A Drowned Horizon – Aurora Molina (2026)

== Recent exhibitions history ==
=== Exploding the Lotus (2008) ===
A multimedia exhibit created by artists from the culture of the Indian Subcontinent. The curators of the show were Jane Hart, curator of exhibitions for the center, and New York-based Jaishri Abichandani.

=== TM Sisters: Ideal Tonight (2009) ===
The exhibit was created by Tasha and Monica López De Victoria (TM Sisters) The New Times newspaper described the show as:

Indeed, their art practically bleeds Miami. It's filled with pastels, dulcet tones that rip from page and screen with spiritual vibrancy. Sharp lines abound, distorting images, or collecting in electric zig-zags that bolt around purposefully. They're pieces that would look as much at home on an album cover for some electro-pop band as they do on the walls of a gallery — which isn't to say they simply languish in pop appeal.

=== Art is Supposed to Hypnotize You or Something (2010) ===
The exhibit was created by Wayne Wright. Former curator Jane Hart had coordinated the NEA funding for the show.

=== The Art of the Brick (2012) ===
The Art of the Brick was traveling exhibition of unique applications of Lego bricks as sculptures by Nathan Sawaya. An Art and Culture had taken place in 2012.

== Gallery ==
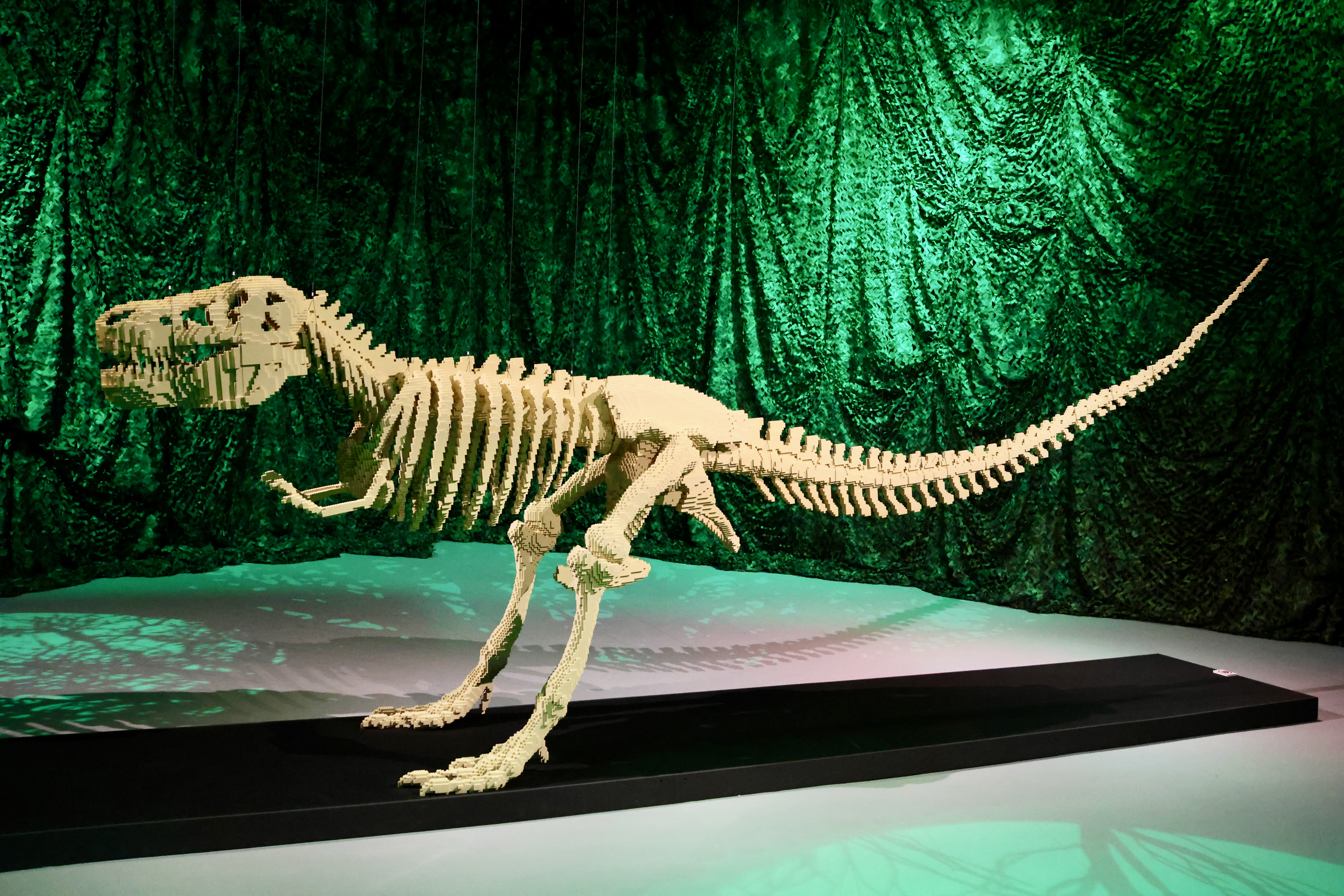
Examples of the Art of the Brick by Sawaya.

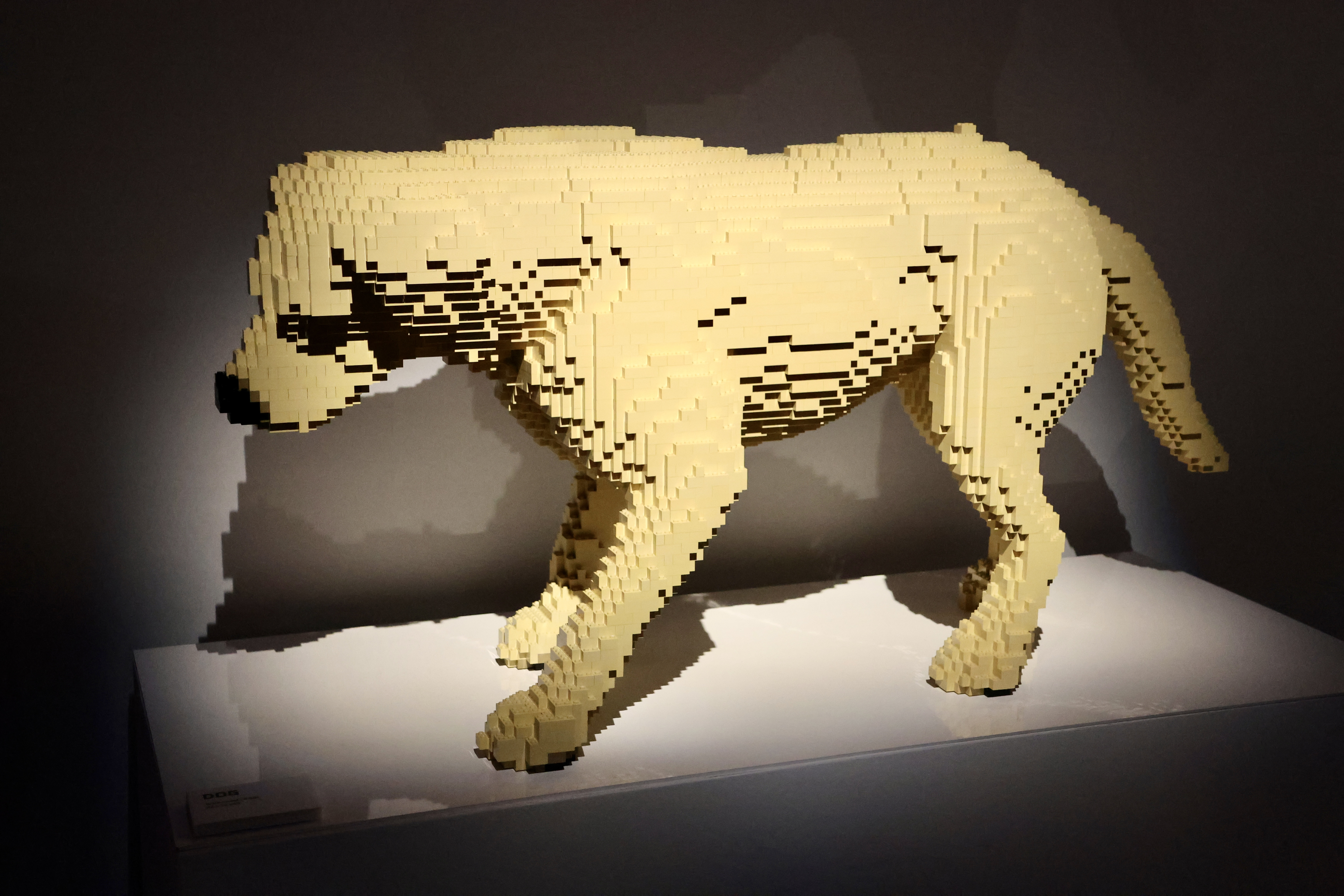
Art of The Brick exhibition in Singapore (2024).

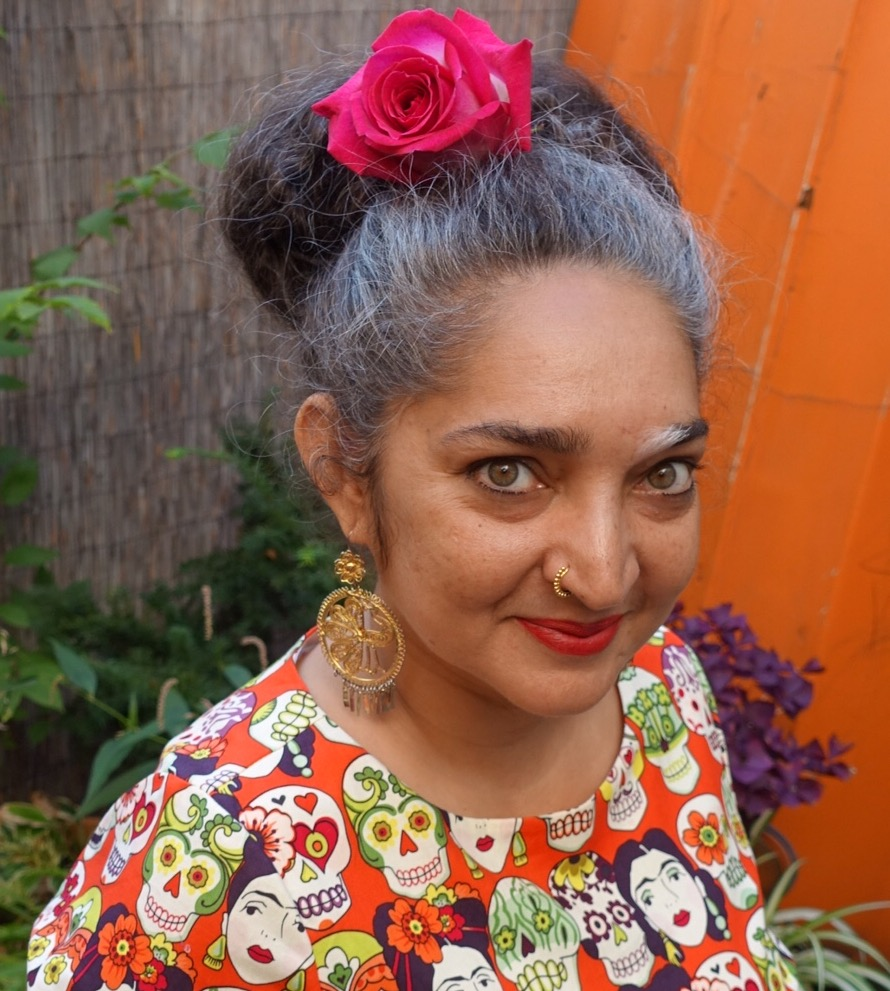
Jaishri Abichandani was one of the curators for "Exploding the Lotus".

== Hollywood Art and Culture Center - Kagey Home ==
Kagey Home
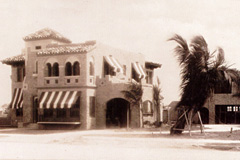
- Interactive map of Kagey Home

History
- Built: 1924
- Built for: Jack Kagey

Site notes
- Architect: Rubush & Hunter

Jack Kagey was a Sales Manager at Joseph W. Young's Hollywood Land and Water Company during the 1920’s Real Estate Boom. Kagey and his 11-man team sold $426,260 in properties in just 10 weeks. First prize was a choice of a car or $5,000. Kagey took the money since he already owned two cars. He then used the money to build his home, the Kagey Home, which is now the main property in the cultural center. The home of his employer, the Joseph Wesley Young House, was designed by Rubush & Hunter. Kagey had the same architect firm design his house as well. In 1992, the building was renovated and became the home of ACCH . The official groundbreaking for the 5,400-square-foot art education wing addition to the building took place April 30, 2024.

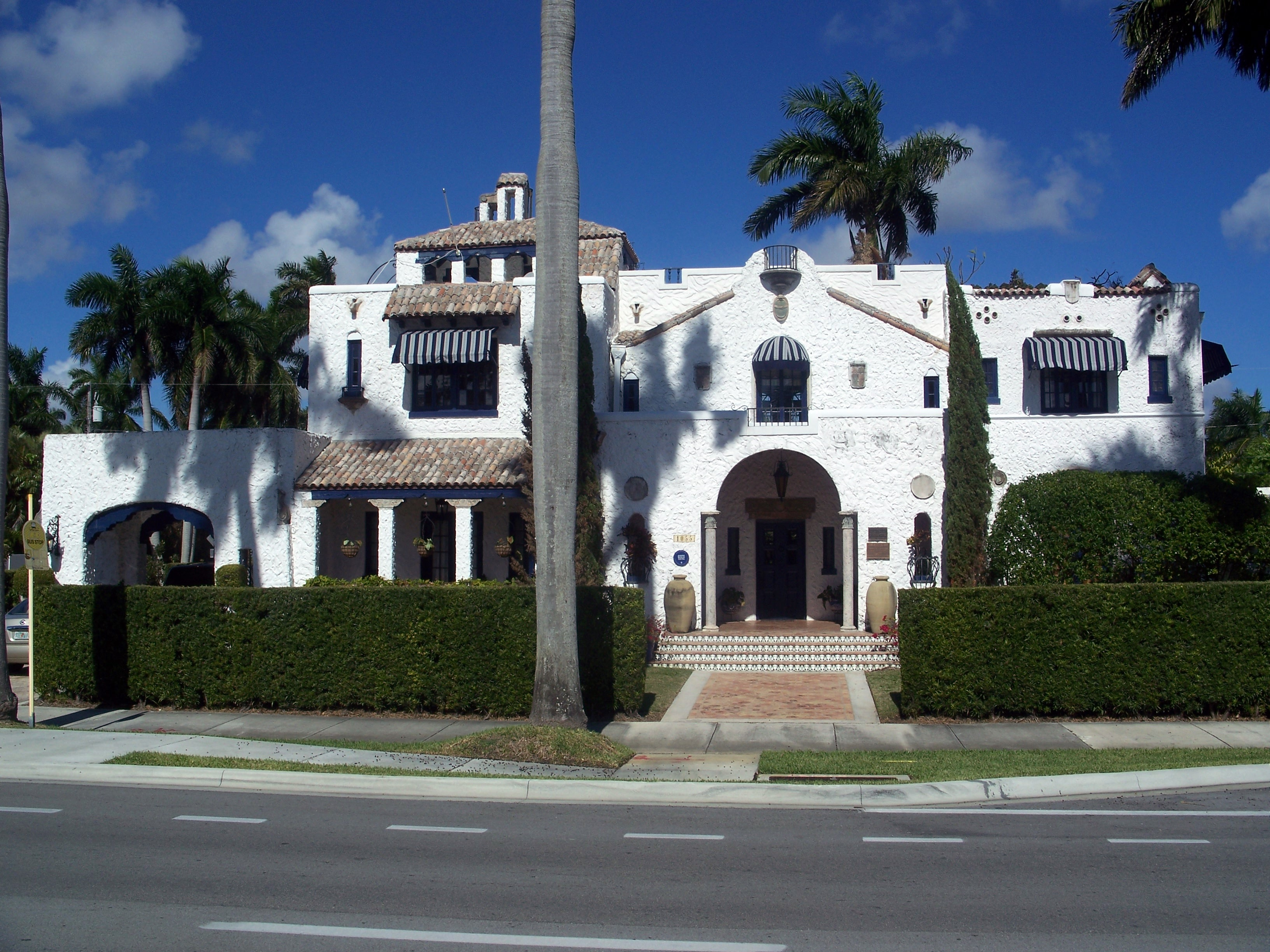
The Joseph Wesley Young House in Hollywood, Florida for comparison to the Kagey home.
