= Chitra Ganesh =

American artist

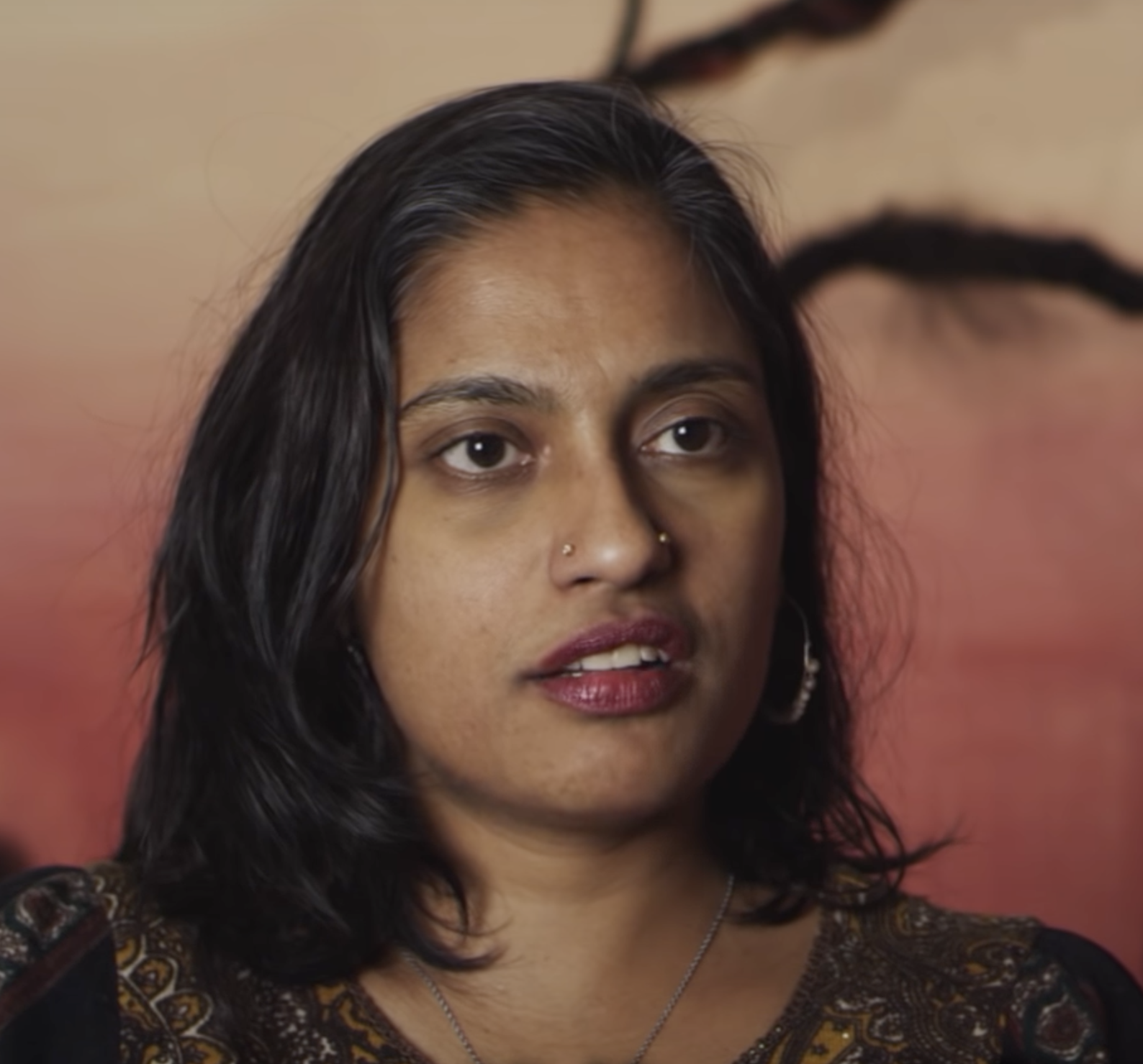
- Ganesh in 2014
- Born: 1975 (age 50–51); Brooklyn, New York, U.S.
- Education: Brown University; Columbia University; Skowhegan School of Painting and Sculpture
- Style: Multimedia
- Partner: Svati Shah
- Website: http://www.chitraganesh.com/

Chitra Ganesh (born 1975 in Brooklyn, New York, U.S.) is an American visual artist. Her work across media includes charcoal drawings, digital collages, films, web projects, photographs, and wall murals. Ganesh draws from mythology, literature, and popular culture such as comics and anime to reveal feminist and queer narratives from the past and to imagine new visions of the future.

== Early life and education ==
=== Early life and influences ===
Chitra Ganesh is the daughter of Indian immigrant parents, born and raised in Brooklyn. Her father won a greencard lottery and her parents immigrated from Calcutta, India to Brooklyn, New York in the early 1970s. Ganesh grew up in the vibrant communities of Brooklyn and Hollis, Queens, amongst Indian, Guyanese, and Sri Lankan immigrant communities. Throughout her childhood she was immersed in visual representation of Bollywood posters, comics, and literature. For the artist, "visual languages in Bollywood's orbit became conduits for expressing an expanded sense of the real, heightening the fantastical and symbolic via a hybrid use of graphics and paint."

Growing up in a diaspora community, Ganesh read Amar Chitra Katha (ACK), a celebrated comic series published in India, with a focus providing stories in religion, history, and myth to children and young adults. These comics have taught children in India and the diaspora about key religious, historical, and mythological themes of the South Asian Subcontinent. Reading comics, both at home in New York City and during summer trips in India, was one of Ganesh's childhood pastimes and would later influence her visual style.

Ganesh's interest in ACK is crucial as many of her works reinterpret and redefine the comic. She was fascinated by the history of ACK and its portrayal of women. When she read the comic as an adult, she realized how often information was presented as timeless, trans-historical, and authentic. However, "the comic actually came with its own arguments, prescribed codes of conduct that maintain hierarchies of gender, skin color, and caste among others." Hence, she had a range of experiences rereading the comics, as reading them with adult eyes made her realize how they had been submerged in her memory.

Ganesh describes learning how to sew, embroider, and draw kolams from a young age, which she later realized were 'gendered forms of creativity.' Her parents encouraged her to pursue art as a hobby and enrolled her in art classes at a young age; however this was never seen as a viable career option, as the field was considered to be financially unstable.

=== Education ===
Ganesh attended Saint Ann's School in Brooklyn and graduated in 1996 from Brown University Phi Beta Kappa with a BA in Comparative Literature and Art Semiotics. She attended the Skowhegan School of Painting and Sculpture in 2001 and received her MFA in Visual Arts from Columbia University School of the Arts, New York in 2002. Ganesh's studies in literature, semiotics, and social theory paved a way for her to become steadily engaged with narrative and deconstruction that animates her work.

During her time at Brown as an undergraduate student, she was passionate about semiotics, feminism, post-coloniality, poetry, and translation. After graduating and moving to New York, Ganesh worked as a New York City public Junior High School teacher in Washington Heights and at Project Reach Youth, a pregnancy prevention program in Sunset Park Brooklyn that was supported by the Children's Aid Society. At this time, she became involved with the South Asian Women's Creative Collective (SAWCC), an arts organization founded in 1997 to support and disseminate the work of South Asian Women artists, and the South Asian Lesbian and Gay Associations. The late 1990s was an essential time for Ganesh because she was influenced by the interactions with South Asian female artists, and by her involvement in a number of progressive communities.

After her mother's death in 1998, Ganesh became hesitant about becoming an artist. The profession was nearly non-existent in her community. Also, she thought becoming an artist was "an option for the wealthy folks or people from a family of artists."

At Columbia University in New York, she focused on finding images that reflected her subjectivity in mainstream art and culture that often meant "reckoning with the anthropological colonial lens that prevail in both the selection and contextualization of art objects, alongside disturbing mass mediated repetitions of South Asian subjects circulated in America." As an artist and a scholar, she realized how important it was for her to articulate her own thoughts and approaches to object making and the cultural histories that informed them. She noticed a distinct absence in representation of South Asian culture, art history, and contemporary art in her curriculum, and took additional classes in anthropology and South Asian studies to "fill in some of these gaps."

== Career and inspirations ==
After graduating from Brown, Ganesh decided to get a job teaching junior high school in Washington Heights and continued to work in education (notably teaching English, and Social Studies). However, when her mother died, her life took a drastic turn, and she began teaching at junior high and kept painting in her apartment; she declared her career as an artist and realized that life is indeed very short.

=== Inspirations ===
Ganesh is inspired by non-canonical narratives and figures, botched love stories, present-day imperialism, lesser-known Hindu/Buddhist icons, nineteenth-century European fairy tales, girl rock, and contemporary visual culture, such as Bollywood posters, anime, and comic books. Her early 24-page comic book, Tales of Amnesia (2002–2007), appropriates scenes from Amar Chitra Katha; the original work's male warrior heroes were replaced with women, through whom Ganesh offer new female subjectivities.

=== The Unknowns ===
Ganesh's series, The Unknowns — a series of mixed-media works on canvas — explore “the relationship between anonymity, mass-mediated images, and the monumental, in the construction of a feminine iconography.” The series brings to mind large subway advertisements and posters and utilize various techniques including painting, collage, and commercial printing processes.

In “Knowing ‘The Unknowns’: The Artwork of Chitra Ganesh,” Svati P. Shah encourages viewers to consider the formal elements of Ganesh’s work instead of simply viewing them as existing in opposition to the art history canon. Shah describes the origins of the subjects’ of The Unknowns as coming from the “margins of a mythic history” and Ganesh's ability to interrogate "the gaze" through this series.

=== Other works and publications ===
Another project by Ganesh that sheds light on the construction of feminine iconography is Eyes of Time, a 4.5-by-12 ft multimedia mural conceived for the Brooklyn Museum in New York. There are three figures in the mural that show "the iteration of feminine power and the cyclical relationship of time." The artist explores the South Asian traditions of Saki, a divine female empowerment, and sacred Indian portrayals of the Greatest Goddess Kali. She not only paints the mural but also associates her work with the collection objects of Brooklyn Museum, which are accompanied with her wall mural.

Ganesh has also contributed to publications such as the anthology Juicy Mother 2, which was a finalist for the Lambda Literary Awards and was edited by Jennifer Camper. She has held residencies at the Lower Manhattan Cultural Council, New York University, Headlands Center for the Arts, Smack Mellon Studios, and the Skowhegan School of Painting and Sculpture, among others.

In 2020, Ganesh created a large-scale installation on the facade of the Leslie-Lohman Museum of Art in New York. Titled A City Will Share Her Secrets If You Know How To Ask, the artist's massive installation covers many of the museum's windows in vinyl prints of the artist's iconic humanoid hybridizations.

In 2024, Ganesh designed Coherence, a series of animated works in Penn Station's Moynihan Train Hall in New York, which further explores "femininity, sexuality, and power" through the emphasis on breathing practices. Later that year, Ganesh's Regeneration was unveiled under the Art at Amtrak program. This work illustrates numerous flora such as the Rose of Jericho and Welwitschia from Southwest Africa, among others, to draw viewers into the vibrancy of nature.

== Awards and honors ==
- Monograph Grant, Canada Council for the Arts, 2022
- Anonymous Was A Woman Award, 2021
- Ford Foundation Artist Grant, 2021
- Virtual artist residency at the University of Michigan Museum of Art (2020–2021)
- Robina Foundation Fellow for Arts and Human Rights (2015, 2016)
- US Art in Embassies Program Resident in NIROX, South Africa (2015)
- Estelle Lebowitz Endowed Visiting Artist (2015)
- Kirloskar Visiting Scholar at RISD (2014)
- Artist in Residence at New York University's Asian/Pacific/American Studies Program (2013, 2014)
- John Simon Guggenheim Memorial Foundation Fellowship in the Creative Arts (2012)
- The Art Matters Foundation Grant (2010)
- The Joan Mitchell Foundation Award for Painting and Sculpture (2010)
- The New York Foundation for the Arts Artist's Fellowship (2009, 2005)

== Selected exhibitions ==
- Regeneration, 2024, Penn Station, New York, NY
- Coherence, 2024, Moynihan Train Hall, Penn Station, New York, NY
- Chitra Ganesh: Tiger Through the Looking Glass, Gallery Wendi Norris, SF
- Away From The Watcher, 2024, Hales Gallery, NY
- Orchid Meditations, 2023, Gallery Espace, New Delhi, India
- Chitra Ganesh: Architects of the Future, 2023, Clifford Gallery, Colgate University
- Astral Dance, 2022, Contemporary Calgary, Alberta, Canada
- Dreaming in Multiverse, 2022, Mildred Lane Kemper Museum of Art, St Louis, MO
- Nightswimmers, 2021, Hales Gallery, NY
- Chitra Ganesh: Sultana’s Dream, 2021, Mandeville Gallery, Union College, NJ
- A city will share her secrets if you know how to ask, 2020, Queer Power Facade Commission, Leslie Lohman Museum of Art, NY
- Sultana’s Dream, 2020, Memorial Art Gallery and Museum, University of Rochester, NY
- Chitra Ganesh: Selected Works on Paper, Pennsylvania Academy of Fine Art, PA
- Unearthly Delights, 2020, Frieze London curated exhibitions, Regents Park
- The Scorpion Gesture, 2018, Rubin Museum of Art, New York, NY
- Her garden, a mirror, 2018, The Kitchen, New York, NY
- Protest Fantasies, 2015, Gallery Wendi Norris, San Francisco, California
- Chitra: Ganesh: Eyes of Time, 2014–15, Brooklyn Museum, New York
- Drawing from the present…, 2014, Lakereen Gallery, Mumbai, India
- Secrets Told: Index of the Disappeared, 2014, New York University, NY
- Her Nuclear Waters…., 2013, Socrates Sculpture Park Billboard Series, NY
- Word of God(ess):Chitra Ganesh, 2011, The Andy Warhol Museum, Pittsburgh
- The Strangling Power of Dust and Stars, 2011, Gallery Nature Morte, Berlin
- She, the Question, 2012, Gothenburg Kunsthalle, Sweden
- The Ghost Effect in Real Time, 2012, Jack Tilton Gallery, NY
- Flickering Myths, 2012, Gallery Wendi Norris, San Francisco (catalog)
- A Zebra Among Horses, 2013, Gallery Espace, New Delhi, India
- Chitra Ganesh, 2013, Twelve Gates Gallery, Philadelphia
- On Site 2: Her Silhouette Returns, 2009, MoMA PS1
- Chitra Ganesh, 2007, Haas & Fischer, Zurich, Switzerland
- Upon Her Precipice, 2007, Thomas Erben, NY
- The Gift: Building a Collection, 2005, Queens Museum of Art, New York
- 739 feet running wall, 2005, Gwangju Contemporary Art Museum, Gwangju, Korea
- East of the Sun West of the Moon, 2004, White Columns, New York
- Her Secret Missions, 2003, Momenta Art, Brooklyn, NY (catalog)
