= Jaishri Abichandani =

American visual artist

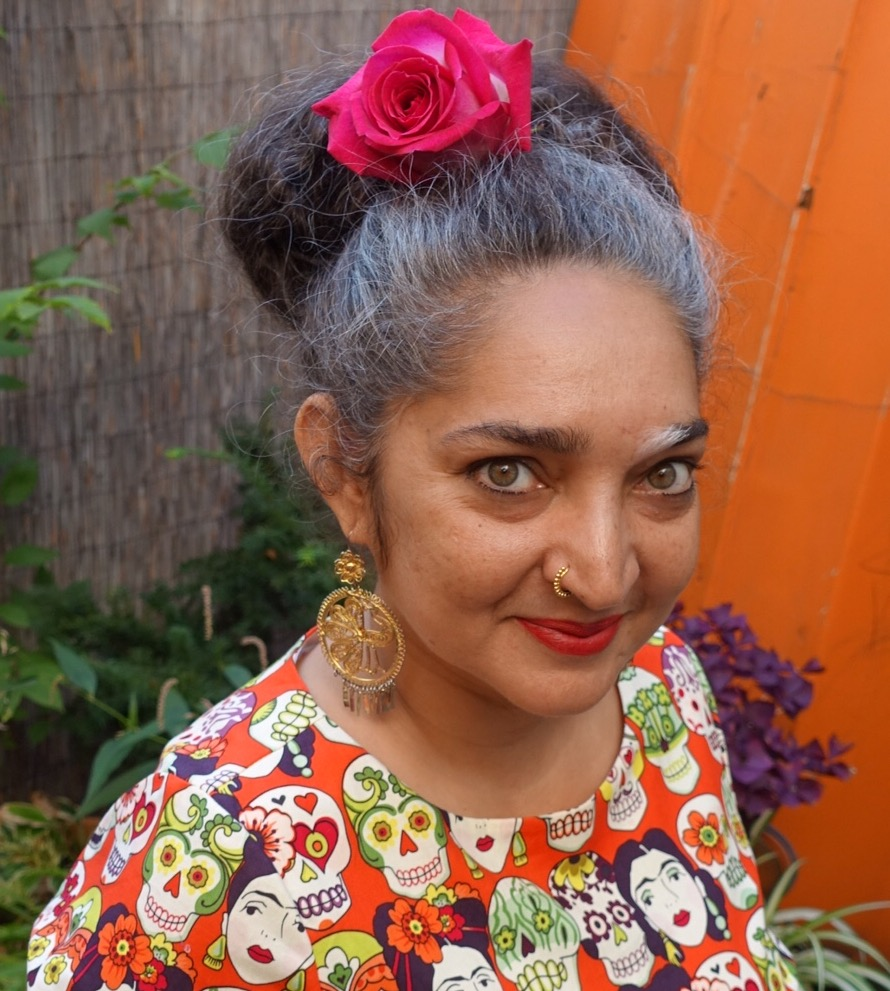
- Born: 1969 (age 56–57); Mumbai, India
- Education: Queens College; Goldsmiths College

Jaishri Abichandani, now known as Pyaari Azaadi (born 1969), is a Brooklyn-based artist and curator. Her interdisciplinary practice focuses on the intersection of art, feminism, and social practice. Abichandani was the founder of the South Asian Women's Creative Collective, with chapters in New York City and London, and director from 1997 until 2013. She was also the Founding Director of Public Events and Projects from at the Queens Museum from 2003 to 2006.

== Early life and education ==
Abichandani was born in Mumbai, India, and was raised in Queens. Abichandani immigrated from Mumbai to Queens in 1984, when she was thirteen. She received a B.A. from Queens College, CUNY, an M.A. in Visual Arts from Goldsmiths College, and a Post-Graduate Diploma in Visual Arts from Goldsmiths College. She works in Brooklyn, New York.

== Career ==
Abichandani's interdisciplinary practice includes creating objects, actions, writing, curating exhibitions, and collective production. Her multi-media sculptural works employ materials ranging from leather whips to jewels and often focuses on the female body and desire. Her work responds to feminist art history and involved nationhood critique, while referencing aesthetic theory from South Asia.

Her works as an artist have been showcased in numerous parts of the world. She is one of the first curators who pushed for Dalit artists to be shown in the US, South Asia, and Europe.

== Selected exhibitions ==
=== Solo exhibitions ===
- Reconciliations, Queens Museum of Art, New York City (2007); Gallery Sumukha, Bangalore, India (2008)
- Dirty Jewels, Rossi & Rossi, London (2010)

=== Group exhibitions ===
- Emergency Room, P.S.1/ MOMA. New York City
- Rossi and Rossi, London, 2010
- Enfoco/ In Focus: Selected Works from the Permanent Collection Art Museum of the Americas, Washington, D.C. (2012)
- The Name, The Nose, Museo Laboratorio, Citta Sant’Angelo, Italy (2014)
- A Bomb With Ribbon Around It, Queens Museum, New York City (2014)
- Lucid Dreams and Distant Visions: South Asian Art in the Diaspora, Asia Society, New York City (2017)
- Then and Now: Commemorating Asian Arts Initiative’s 25th Anniversary, Philadelphia (2018)

== Awards ==
Year	Title
2001	Enfoco New Works Award, New York City
2006	Urban Artists Award, New York City
2009	Brooklyn Arts Council BRIC Artist's Honoree, New York City
2015	LMCC Process Space Residency

== South Asian Women’s Creative Collective ==
Abidichandani founded the South Asian Women's Creative Collective (SAWCC) in New York City in 1997 and London in 2004, and served on the Board of Directors until 2013. SAWCC is a nonprofit arts organization focused on the advancement of, and creating a sense of community between, emerging and established South Asian women artists and creative professionals. Fourteen women, who were invited through community-based organizations such as Sakhi for South Asian Women and the South Asian Lesbian and Gay Association (SALGA), attended SAWCC's first meeting in the offices of the Sister Fund and then began meeting monthly at the Asian American Writers’ Workshop, providing a venue to exchange ideas and feedback on their creative work and network with other South Asian women artists.

== Curatorial projects ==
- Fatal Love: South Asian American Art Now, Queens Museum of Art, New York City (2005)
- Queens International 2006, Queens Museum of Art, New York City (2006)
- Sultana's Dream, Exit Art, New York City (2007)
- Fire Walkers (Curatorial Consultant) Stux Gallery, New York City (2008)
- Exploding the Lotus, Arts and Culture Center of Hollywood. Hollywood, Florida (2008)
- Transitional Aesthetics, Beijing 798 Biennial, Beijing (2009)
- Artists in Exile, Arario Gallery, New York City (2009)
- Anomalies, Rossi & Rossi, London (2009)
- Shapeshifters and Aliens, Rossi & Rossi, London (2011)
- Stargazing, Rossi & Rossi, London (2012)
- Her Stories, Queens Museum of Art, New York City (2012)
- Sheherzades's Gift: Subversive Narratives, Center for Book Arts, New York City (2016)
- Loving Blackness, Asian Arts Initiative, Philadelphia, PA (2017)
- Lucid Dreams and Distant Visions: South Asian Art in the Diaspora, Asia Society, New York City (2017)
- Utopian Imagination Trilogy (Perilous Bodies, Radical Love, Utopian Imagination), Ford Foundation Gallery, New York City (2019)
