= Asia Pacific Leadership Program =

Hawaiian graduate-level certificate program

Coordinates: 21.2969831°N 157.8168324°W

Asia Pacific Leadership Program (APLP) is the signature program of the East-West Center linking advanced and interdisciplinary analysis of emergent regional issues with experiential leadership learning.

It is a certificate program for graduate-level students and mid-level professionals held at University of Hawaii at Manoa campus. Each year's 45 participants come from many countries in Asia-Pacific. The program includes field trips to different cities in United States like Washington DC and Los Angeles and different countries like Japan, Thailand, Laos, Vietnam and Cambodia.

Most APLP participants reside in Hale Manoa Dormitory during their program.
