= Stephanie Diamond =

American artist and entrepreneur

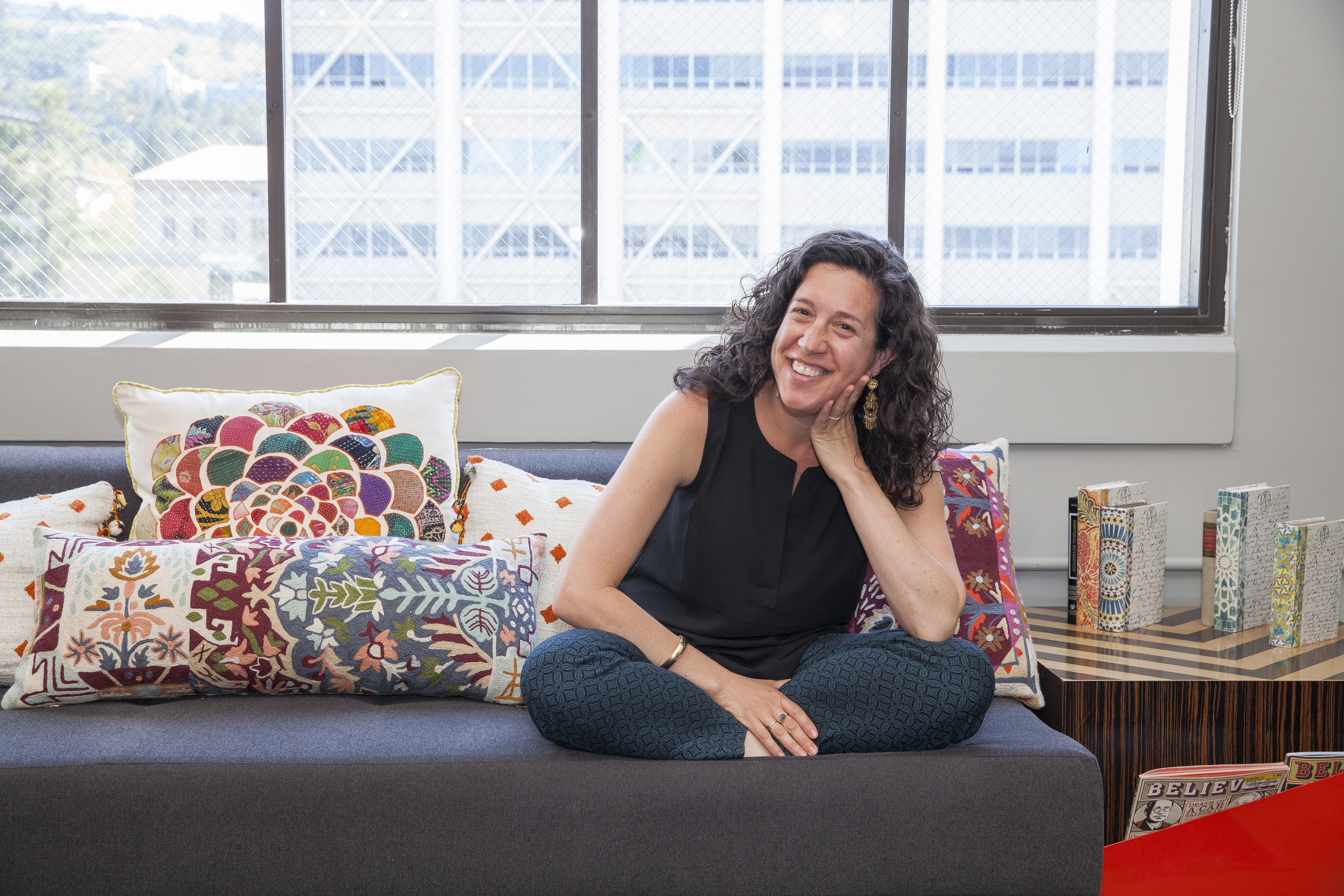
Stephanie Diamond, Creator/Founder of Listings Project.

Stephanie Diamond is an American artist and entrepreneur who creates interdisciplinary works focusing on personal and collective healing, interpersonal communication, and community-building.

== Education ==
Diamond earned a Bachelor of Fine Arts (BFA) from the Rhode Island School of Design in 1997 and a Masters of Arts (MA) from New York University in 2003. She attended the Skowhegan School of Painting and Sculpture in 2000.

== Career ==
From 1998 to 2000, Diamond served as the Education and Community Coordinator at MoMA PS1 where she organized the institution's first annual Community Day event in 1999. She later worked as the Director of Education and Community Relations at Socrates Sculpture Park from 2000 to 2002. Her work has been exhibited at the Museum of Modern Art, the Queens Museum, the Massachusetts Museum of Contemporary Art (MASS MoCA), the Bronx Museum of the Arts and Project Row Houses.

In 2003, Diamond founded Listings Project, a platform initially created to share pre-screened apartment listings in New York City. Over time, the platform expanded internationally to include verified listings for living and working spaces as well as collaborative opportunities.

Diamond is also a certified 5Rhythms instructor and co-founder of Hudson Valley 5Rhythms in Cold Spring, NY.
